= List of tourist attractions in Kannur =

Kannur, India, has a number of tourist attractions, including beaches, hills, temples, and other monuments.

== Beaches ==
Kannur has several beaches, including the following:

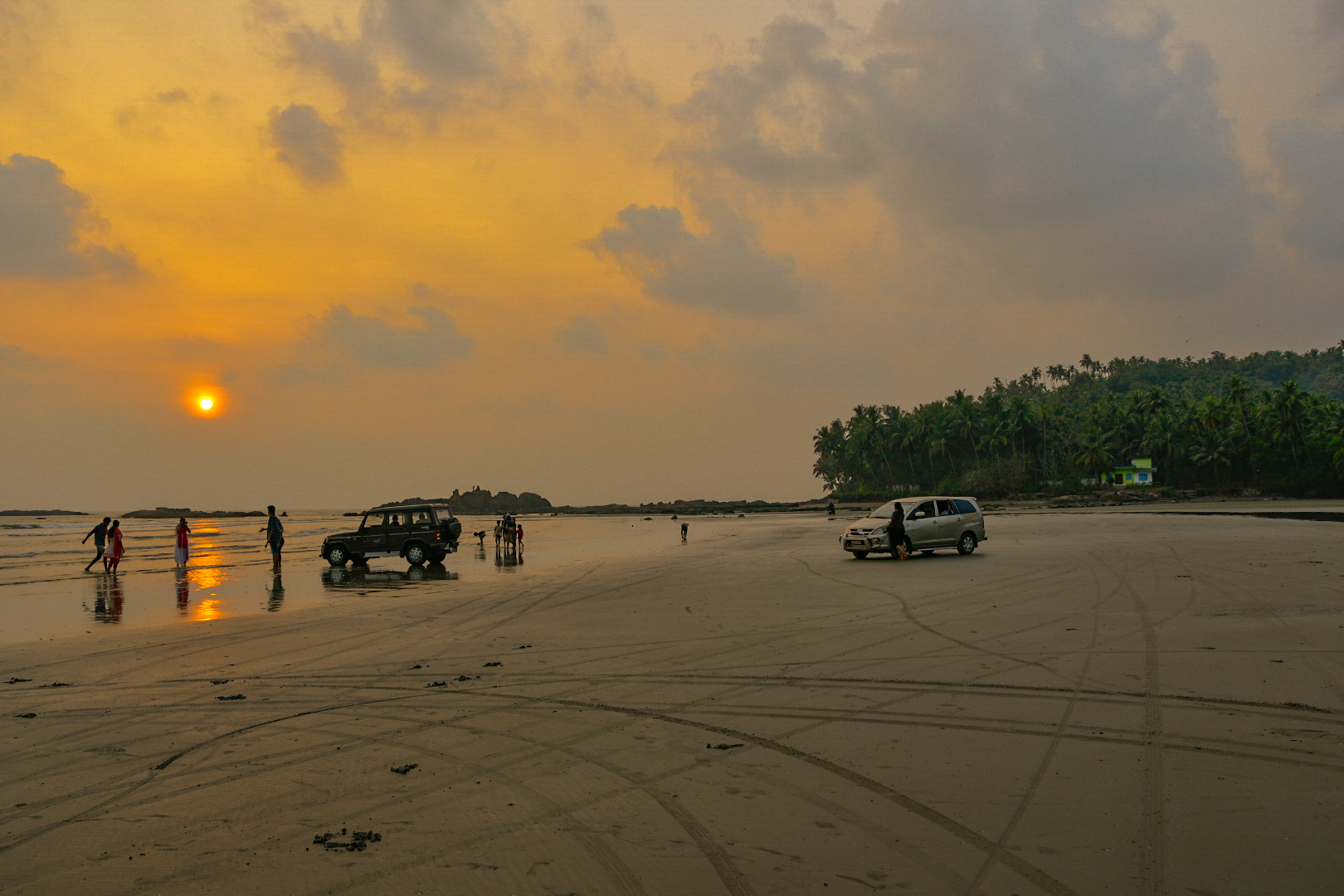
Muzhappilangad Drive-in Beach

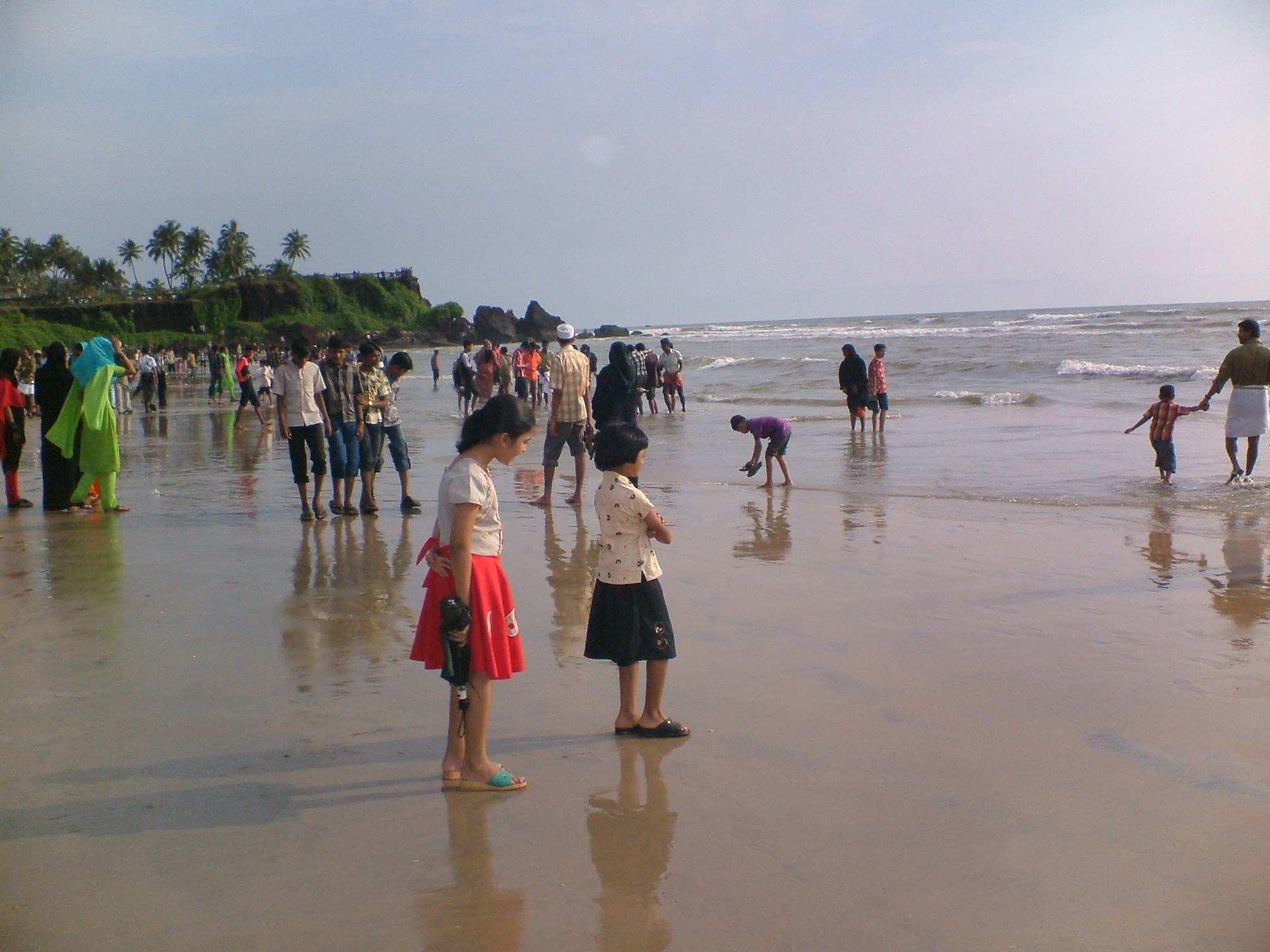
Payyambalam Beach

- Muzhappilangad Drive-in Beach: Kerala's only drive-in beach, located about 7 km north of Thalassery and 15 km from Kannur. Five village roads winding through coconut groves leads to the beach.
- Payyambalam Beach: A beach located within Kannur city, featuring an unbroken coastline extending several kilometres. Ships in transit along the Malabar Coast can be seen offshore, travelling beyond Kozhikode towards Mangalore, Goa and Mumbai. The beach also has a landscaped garden and a sculpture of a mother and child by sculptor Kanayi Kunhiraman.
- Baby Beach: A smaller beach adjacent to Payyambalam Beach. St. Angelo Fort is located nearby.
- Meenkunnu Beach: Situated at Azhikode, approximately 10 kilometres from Kannur city. The beach features the Meenkunnu cliff, from where views of the Ezhimala hills can be seen, as well as a viewpoint overlooking Payyambalam Beach.
- Mappila Bay: Located near St. Angelo's Fort, Mappila Bay has historical significance and was once associated with the Kolathiri rulers. The Kadalayi Fort and Sree Krishna Temple were historically notable. Remnants of these structures are still visible. A fishing harbour developed with assistance from the Indo-Norwegian Project is located at the bay.
- Chal Beach: Located about 11 km from Kannur city. A beach park is available for visitors.
- Kizhunna Ezhara Beach: Located approximately 11 km from Kannur, this beach is considered one of the more secluded beaches in Kerala.
- Chootad Beach: Situated about 27 km from Kannur city and 4.6 km from Pazhayangadi. It is noted for its cleanliness.
- Palliyamoola Beach: Located about 5.2 km from Kannur city. The beach is relatively secluded, and several beach resorts are located in the area.
- Dharmadam Island: Located about 100 metres from the mainland at Dharmadam, this privately owned 5-acre (20,000 m^{2}) island is covered with coconut palms and dense vegetation and is visible from Muzhappilangad Beach. During low tide, the island can be reached on foot from the shore. The island is surrounded by rivers and the sea. Permission is required for entry. Dharmadam, formerly known as Dharmapattanam, was once a Buddhist stronghold.

== Snake Park ==
The Snake Park is a landmark in Kannur district, located at Parassinikkadavu on the route from Kannur to Taliparamba, about 2 kilometres (1.2 mi) from National Highway 17. The park houses a wide range of snakes and other small animals. It also conducts live demonstrations in which trained personnel handle and explain various species of snakes, including cobras and members of the viper family, with the aim of addressing common myths and superstitions associated with snakes.

The Snake Park was established by the Visha Chikista Kendra at Pappinisseri and has become a tourist attraction for both domestic and international visitors. The centre provides treatment for snakebites and is known for combining Ayurveda and allopathic medicine in its approach to treatment.

The park is reported to house around 150 varieties of snakes, including the Spectacled cobra, King cobra, Russell's viper, kraits, and various pit vipers. It also maintains a collection of non-venomous snakes, including members of the python family. A research laboratory for the extraction of snake venom has been proposed for the site. The park is dedicated to the preservation and conservation of snakes, many species of which are considered threatened. The laboratory is located about 16 kilometres (9.9 mi) from Kannur.

Parassinikkadavu is also known for the Muthappan temple, which is notable as the only temple in Kerala where a Theyyam performance is conducted daily as a ritual offering.

== Forts ==
=== St. Angelo Fort ===
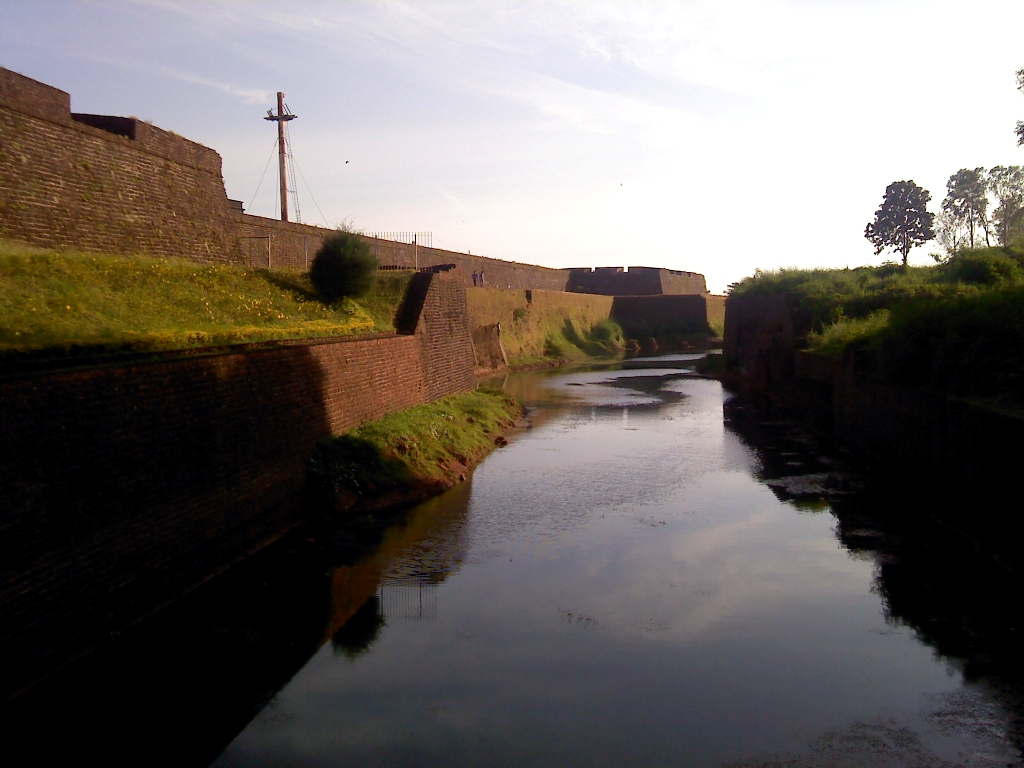
St. Angelo Fort

St. Angelo Fort, built in 1505 by Sir Francisco de Almeida, the first Portuguese Viceroy of India, is situated near the coast, about 2 kilometres (1.2 mi) from Kannur town. The fort witnessed several conflicts for control until it came under British rule in 1790. It is currently in a relatively good state of preservation and is a protected monument under the Archaeological Survey of India (ASI). A painting depicting the fort and a fishing ferry in the background is held in the Rijksmuseum in Amsterdam.

St. Angelo Fort is a prominent historical monument and tourist site. The Kerala Police has deployed Tourism Police Officers at the fort for the protection of the monument and to assist visitors. One of the officers, Sathyan Eddakkad, has written a Malayalam-language book titled Vasco Da Gaamyum charithrathile kaanaappurangalum (Vasco da Gama and the Unknown Pages of History), which discusses the historical background and present condition of the fort.

Although smaller than Bekal Fort in Kasaragod, the fort is known for its greenery and maintained surroundings. Nearby landmarks include Payyambalam and the Government Guest House.

=== Tellicherry Fort ===
Tellicherry Fort is located in Thalassery (Tellicherry) town. Tellicherry was one of the important European trading centres in Kerala. In the 17th century, the British established a trading factory north of Tellicherry. Subsequently, they obtained land from Vadakkelamkur, the de facto ruler of Kolathunad, and established a factory at Tellicherry in 1708.

== Paithalmala ==
Paithalmala is a hill station located on the Kerala–Karnataka border, approximately 65 km north of Kannur. Situated at an elevation of about 1,371.6 metres above sea level, it is a popular destination for trekking. A base reception centre and a watchtower at the summit operate for the benefit of tourists and trekkers. Paithalmala is located near Kudianmala.

== Ezhimala ==
Ezhimala, identified as the capital of the ancient Mooshika kings, is regarded as a significant historical site. It is a prominent and isolated cluster of hills forming a promontory, located about 38 km north of Kannur town. In ancient Kerala, Ezhimala was a flourishing seaport and centre of trade, and it was one of the major battlefields during the 11th-century Chola–Chera conflicts.

According to tradition, Buddha is believed to have visited Ezhimala. An old mosque, believed to contain the mortal remains of Shaikh Abdul Latif, a Muslim reformist, is also located in the area. The hills are noted for the presence of rare medicinal herbs.

Ezhimala is also home to the Mount Deli Lighthouse, an ancient tower of historical significance. It is maintained by the Indian Navy and lies within a restricted area. The local beach sand is noted for its distinct texture, and the sea is considered comparatively clearer than in surrounding regions. At Ettikulam Bay, dolphin sightings have been reported. Bordered by the sea on three sides, Ezhimala has gained prominence in India's naval history following the establishment of the Indian Naval Academy in the area.

== Madayipara ==
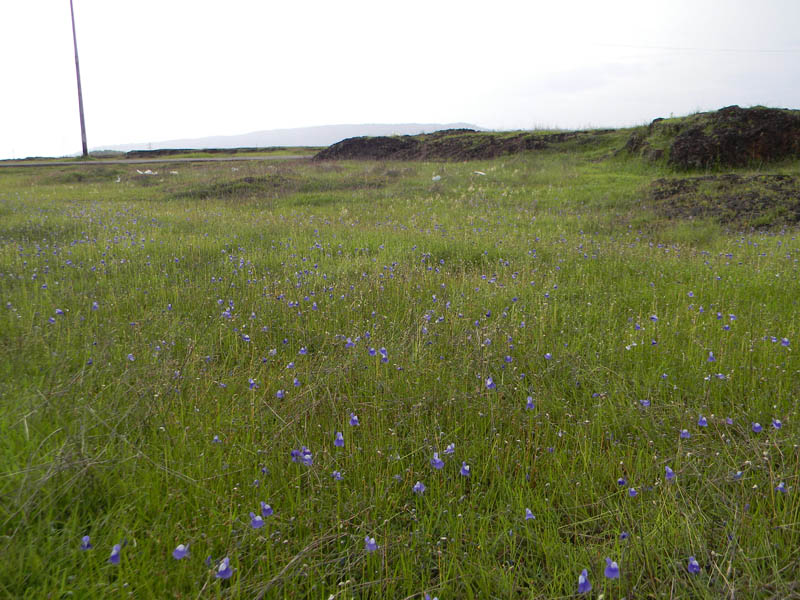
Madayi Para in August

Madayipara is noted for its biodiversity as well as its historical significance. It is believed to have served as an administrative centre of the Ezhimala kings. Remnants of historical structures can be found in and around the plateau. On the southern side of the hill are the remains of a fort known as Pazhi Kotta (kotta meaning fort in Malayalam), along with watchtowers located at its four corners. Between AD 14 and AD 18, Madayipara is said to have been the site of coronation ceremonies of the rulers of the princely state of Kolathunadu.

The hillock, which bears several indicators of historical importance, is also significant from a religious perspective. A pond shaped like a hand-held mirror, associated with ancient Jewish settlers, is one of the notable features of the area. Another attraction is the Vadukunda Siva Temple and its adjoining lake, covering an area of about one acre. The lake does not dry up even during peak summer months and supports local flora and fauna. The Pooram festival of Madayi Kavu (kavu referring to family temples and those located amid dense vegetation), held at Madayipara, has contributed to the site's prominence.

In terms of biodiversity, Madayipara is reported to host around 300 species of flowering plants, approximately 30 varieties of grass, and several insectivorous plant species. The region is also known for rare medicinal herbs. Faunal diversity includes about 100 species of butterflies and nearly 150 species of birds. The Atlas butterfly, one of the largest butterflies in the world, has been recorded in the area.

== V-Pra Kaayal Floating Park ==
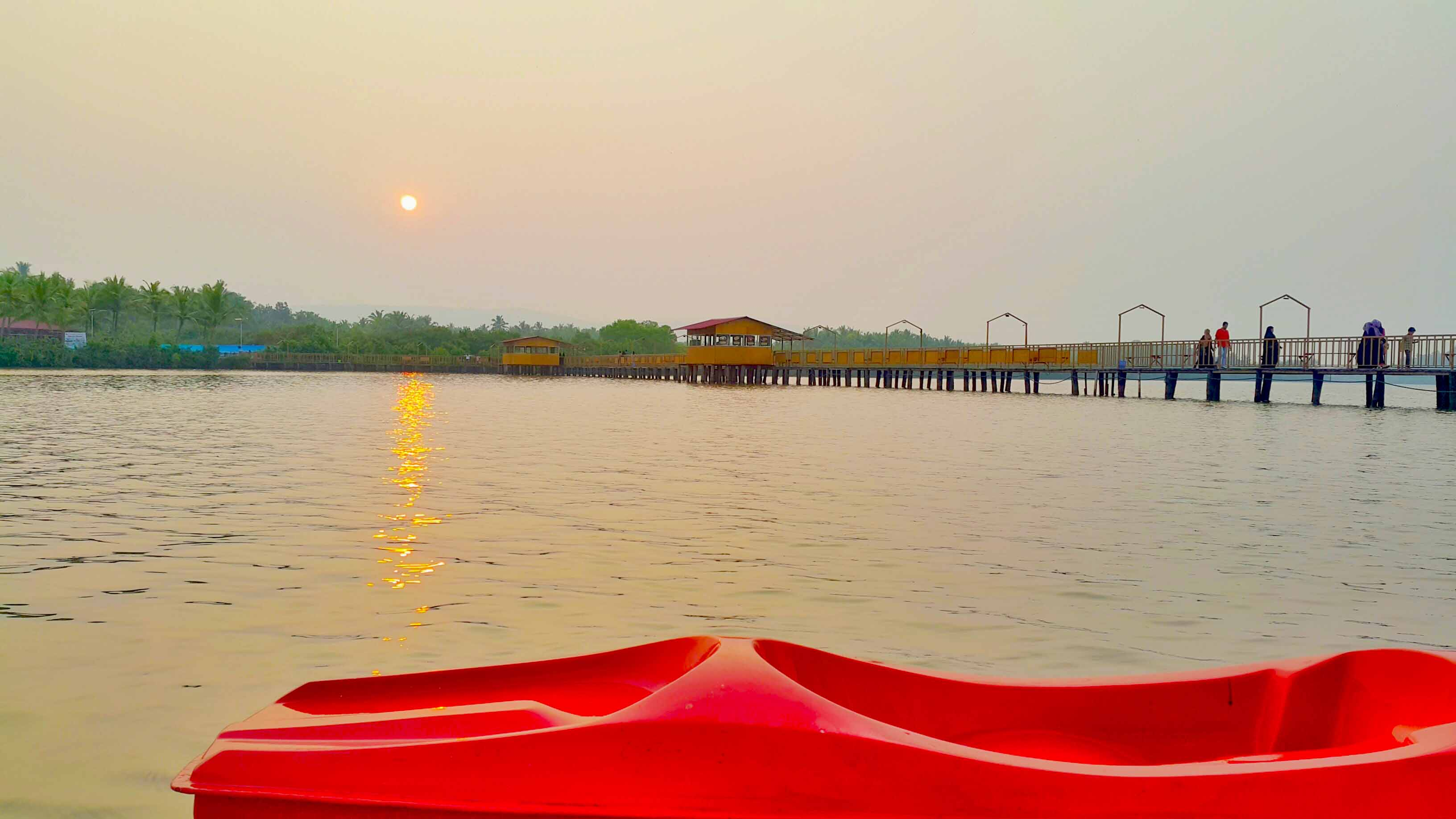

The Vayalapra Kaayal Floating Park, also known as V-Pra Park, was inaugurated on 5 June 2016. It is situated on Vayalapra Lake near Madayi.

== District Agricultural Farm, Taliparamba ==
Established in 1905, the District Agricultural Farm, Kannur, is one of the oldest agricultural farms in South India. Located at Taliparamba, about 20 kilometres from Kannur city, the farm was established by Sir Charles Alfred Barber at the behest of the erstwhile Madras Government, following the recommendations of the Government of India's Famine Commission of 1880.

== Hanging Bridge (Thookku Palam) – Peralassery ==
The hanging bridge at Peralassery, locally known as Thookku Palam, is a notable tourist attraction. It is one of the few hanging bridges in Kannur district.

== Kanjirakolly Waterfalls, Payyavoor ==
Kanjirakkolly Falls

The Kanjirakolly Falls are located approximately 55 kilometres (34 mi) from Kannur. A viewing point is available about 1 kilometre (0.62 mi) from the falls at Sasippara.

== Other attractions ==
- Vismaya Amusement Park - One of the popular amusement park in Kerala,and major attarcation in Kannur, Won IAAPI - National Award Of Excellence 2024 2025.
- Sadhoo Merry Kingdom – A popular water theme park and tourist attraction in Kannur.
- St. Angelo Fort – Built in 1505 by the first Portuguese Viceroy of India, Dom Francisco de Almeida. It was captured by the Dutch in 1663, sold to the Arakkal King in 1772, and came under British control in 1790 until Indian independence in 1947.
- Payyambalam Beach – A beach in Kannur with an unbroken coastline of several kilometres. Ships along the Malabar Coast from beyond Kozhikode towards Mangalore, Goa and Mumbai are visible from the shore. The beach features a landscaped garden and a sculpture of a mother and child by Kanayi Kunhiraman. The area has experienced some vandalism.
- Muzhappilangad Drive-in Beach – A 4 km-long drive-in beach in Kerala, running parallel to National Highway 66 (formerly NH 17) between Kannur and Thalassery.
- Arakkal Museum – Located in Ayikkara, the museum is dedicated to the Arakkal family, the only Muslim royal family in Kerala. It is part of the Arakkalkettu (Arakkal Palace), with the Durbar Hall converted into a museum. Opened in July 2005, it is managed by the Arakkal Family Trust.
- Sree Peralassery Temple – Located about 14 km from Kannur on the way to Koothuparamba.
- MGS Kalari Sangam – A martial arts and massage training academy founded in 1934.
- Kannur Lighthouse – Situated near Sea View Park, the lighthouse was originally built in 1843 at St. Angelo Fort by the British. Renovated over the years, it was relocated to its current site in 1948 and remains operational.
- Kannur Cantonment – One of the 62 cantonments in India and the only one in Kerala. Established by the British in the 19th century, it remains an important location for the Indian armed forces.
- Mele Chovva – Located 3 km south of Kannur on the Kannur–Tellicherry road; serves as an entry junction to the town. The road to Kannur Airport starts here.
- Puthiyatheru – Situated on the Kannur–Taliparamba road, it is a busy area with roads leading to Kattampalli, Panakavu, and Chirakkal.
- Palakkayamthattu – A hill station known for sightseeing and recreational activities.
- DSC Centre – Located in Kannur town on the road to Payyambalam Beach, it serves as the mother depot for all DSC platoons in India and is maintained by the Kannur Cantonment Board.
- Baby Beach – A smaller beach adjacent to Payyambalam Beach, near St. Angelo Fort. It is part of the Kannur Cantonment and access may be restricted.
- Meenkunnu Beach – Located at Azhikode, a few kilometres from Kannur town.
- Mappila Bay – A major fishing harbour in Ayikkara near St. Angelo Fort, overlooking the Laccadive Sea.
- Azhikkal Ferry – Operates near Azhikode, about 10 km from Kannur, at the confluence of the Valapattanam River and the Laccadive Sea. A 2 km granite pathway extends into the sea, with passenger boats available to Mattool, Parassinikkadavu and Valapattanam.
- Fort Road – One of the busiest roads in Kannur, featuring several shopping streets and malls, including Kannur City Center.
- Sea View Park – Situated near Payyambalam Beach and overlooked by the Government Guest House.
- Kannur Central Bus Terminal – Kerala's largest bus terminal, developed on a build–operate–transfer (BOT) basis.
- Kannur Indoor Stadium – Located at Mundayad, about 6 km from Kannur town; it is the largest indoor stadium in South India.
- Thottada Beach – Located about 2.5 km from NH 17 connecting Kannur and Thalassery.
- Parassinikkadavu Snake Park – A snake conservation centre dedicated to the preservation of snakes.
- Aralam Wildlife Sanctuary – Known for elephants, sloth bears, mouse deer, and other wildlife.
- Elapeedika – A village around 1,000 m above sea level in the Western Ghats. Elapeedika is a hill station with historical significance; cardamom plantations were once prevalent, and an 18th-century battle between Pazhassiraja's forces and the East India Company took place at Periya Pass. The nearest railway stations are at Tellicherry and Kannur (about 50 km by road), and the nearest airport is Kannur International Airport, 20 km away.
- Paithalmala – A hill station bordering Kodagu (Karnataka) in Alakode Panchayat, Kannur.
- Thabore – A nearby hill station.
- Mangrove Trail of Malabar – A coastal jungle trail for day visitors, approximately 45 km from Kannur, offering hiking, birdwatching, and boating.
- Kannur International Airport – Located in Mattanur, Kannur District, it is the fourth and largest international airport in Kerala.

== Temples ==
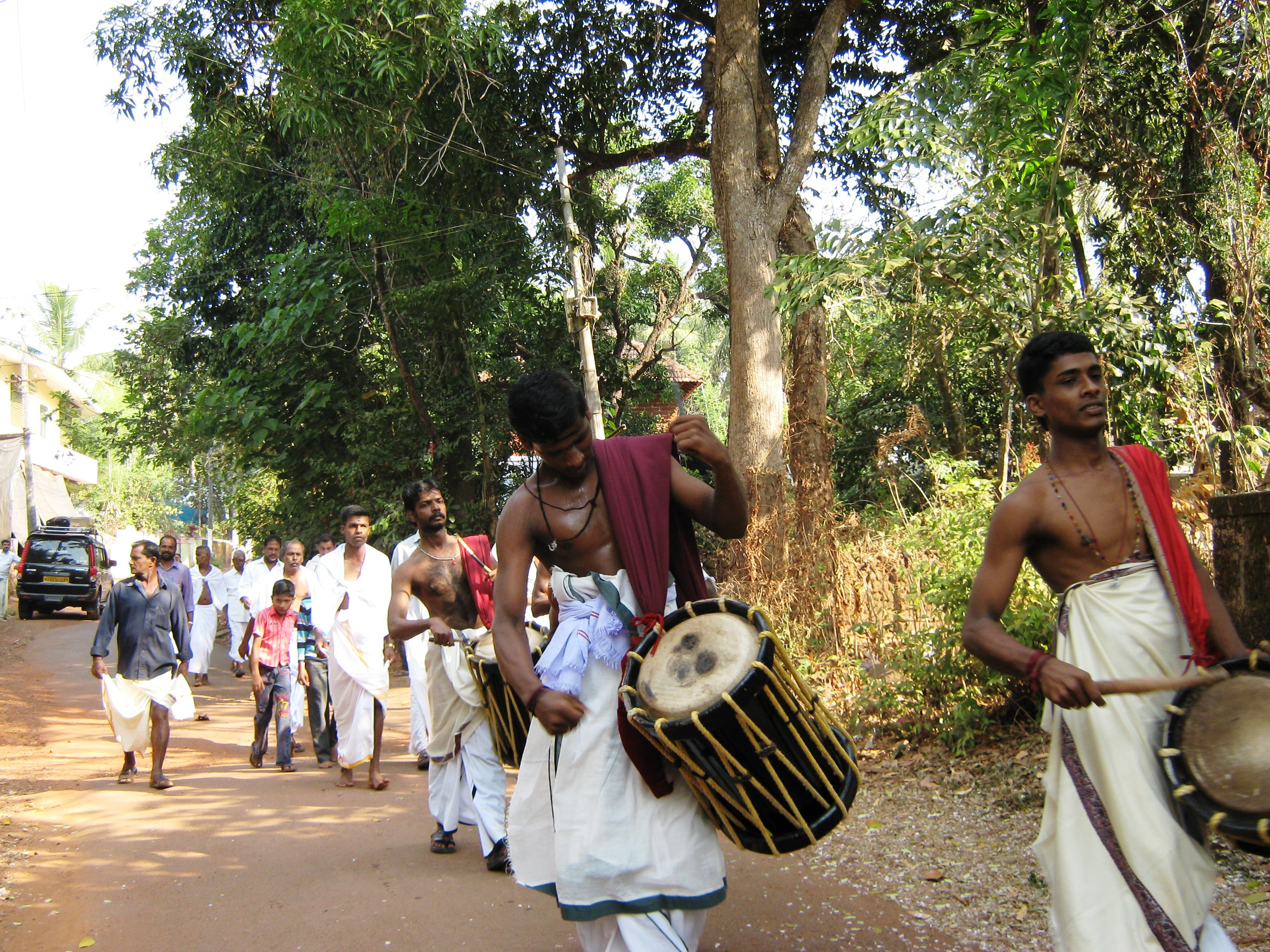
Temple festival at Chalad

Kannur is often referred to as the "Land of Krishna" (Kannande uuru) due to the presence of several prominent temples, including the Kadalai Shri Krishnaswami Temple, Shri Rajarajeshwaram, Parassinikadavu Sree Muthappan Temple, Annapurneshwari Temple, and Madayikavu. These temples are among the most significant religious and cultural landmarks in the region.

Other notable temples in Kannur district include:

- Kottiyoor Vadakkeshwaram Temple
- Kalarivathukkal Bhagavathy Temple
- Tiruvarkadu Bhagavathy Temple (also known as Madayi Kavu)
- Andalurkavu, Dharmadom
- Sree Mahadeva Temple, Mudappathur (Vaidyanatha)
- Payyanur Subrahmanyaswamy Temple
- Kanhirangad Vaidyanatha Temple
- Peralassery Subrahmanya Swamy Temple
- Ramanthali Sankaranarayana Temple
- Thayyil Sree Venkataramana Temple
- Thalap Sundareswara Temple
- Trichambaram Sree Krishnaswamy Temple
- Kandamthalli Sreekrishna Temple
- Mazhoor Sree Balabhadra Swamy Temple
- Koyyam Sree Maha Vishnu Temple
- Kadalayi Sreekrishna Temple
- Mattanur Mahadeva Temple
- Thiruvangad Sriramaswamy Temple
- Kannadiparamba Dharmasastha Temple
- Velam Ganapathi Kshetram Temple
- Ezhome Sree Trikkool Shiva Temple
- Karippal Nagam Perumbadave
- Melechovva Shiva Temple
- Vadeswaram Sree Mahashiva Temple, Aroli
- Sree Lakshmi Narasimha Swami Temple, Puravoor

This compilation includes both major pilgrimage sites and local temples that hold cultural and historical importance in the Kannur district.

== Mosques ==
- Madayi Palli, Madayi
- Odatthil Palli, Thalassery

== Churches ==
=== St. Mary's Forane Church and Marian Pilgrim Centre, Taliparamba ===
From the early 1960s, Syrian Catholics began settling in Taliparamba for purposes such as education, employment, and trade. During that period, they attended Trichambaram St. Paul's Church and Pushpagiri CMI Church for religious services.

St. Mary's Parish was formally established on 25 December 1990 under the Tellicherry Archdiocese. The foundation stone for the church was laid on 15 August 2008. The church was inaugurated for worshippers on 14 April 2012 in a ceremony presided over by Rev. Mar George Valyamattam, Metropolitan. On 17 March 2013, the church was declared a Forane Church and a Marian Pilgrim Centre.
