= Kingdom of Kannur =

Kingdom of Kannur may refer to:

- Former feudal states in Malabar, India
  - Kolathunadu
  - Arakkal Kingdom
