= Arakkal Beevi =

Arakkal Beevi refers to the female ruler of Arakkal Kingdom in Kerala, South India.

Sultana Aysha Aliraja was the ruler until her death on the morning of 27 September 2006.

== Cultural depictions ==
- Ayesha Ali Raja (played by Genelia D'Souza) appears as a character in a Malayalam film titled Urumi. The film is based on a fictional story about a young Indian who tries to assassinate Portuguese explorer, Vasco da Gama. The movie was released on 31 March 2011. But the Arakkal Ayesha played by Genelia D'Souza is different from Aysha Aliraja.
