= Ayikkara =

Ayikkara Kannur city
- Neighborhood
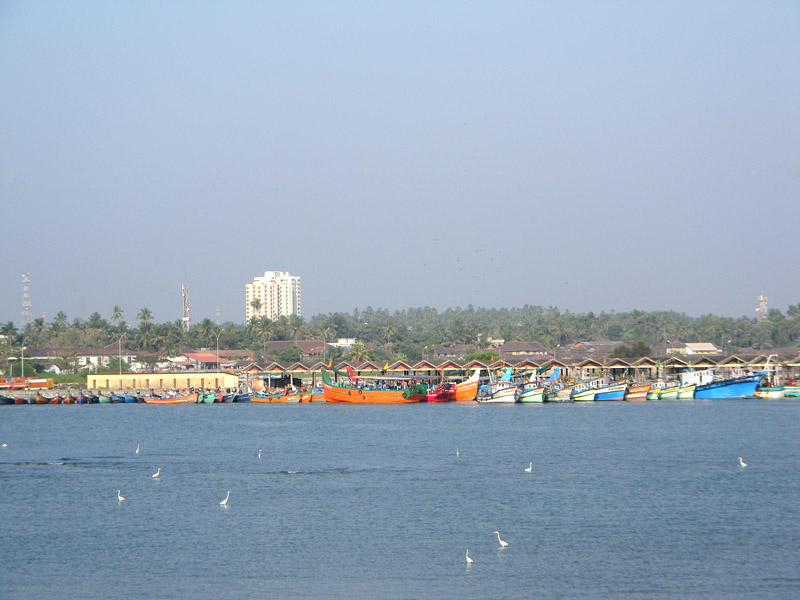
- Mappila Bay
- Interactive map of Ayikkara
- Coordinates: 11°51′33″N 75°22′27″E
- Country: India
- State: Kerala
- District: Kannur

Government
  - Body: Kannur Municipal Corporation

Languages
  - Official: Malayalam, English
- Time zone: UTC+5:30 (IST)
- ISO 3166 code: IN-KL
- Vehicle registration: KL-

Ayikkara is a neighborhood and one among the 56 divisions of Kannur Municipal Corporation in Kannur district of Kerala state, India. Kannur fort and the Mappila Bay is near Ayikkara. Sahil Saleem, a notable women's rights activist lives here.

== Local name ==
The locals call Ayikkara as 'Kannur city' because once it was a downtown area during the Arakkal rule. The city area is called 'Kannur town'.

== Arakkal palace ==
The remains of the Arakkalkettu, which is the palace of the Arakkal family, is also located in Ayikkara. The Government of Kerala has renovated a part of the Arakkalkettu into a museum. This Arakkal museum is a tourist attraction located in Ayikkara.

== Mappila Bay ==
'Mappila Bay fishing harbour' is located in Ayikkara. There is also a government shrimp hatchery near the harbour. (see: Matsyafed)

== Image gallery ==
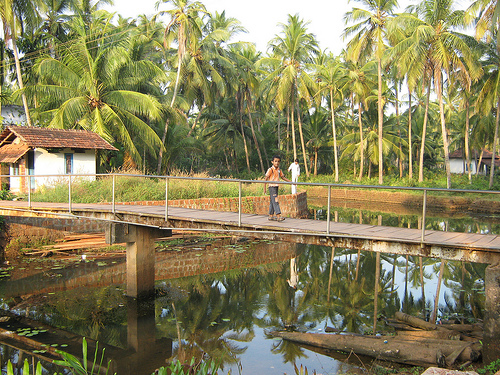
Wooden Bridge at Uruvanchal

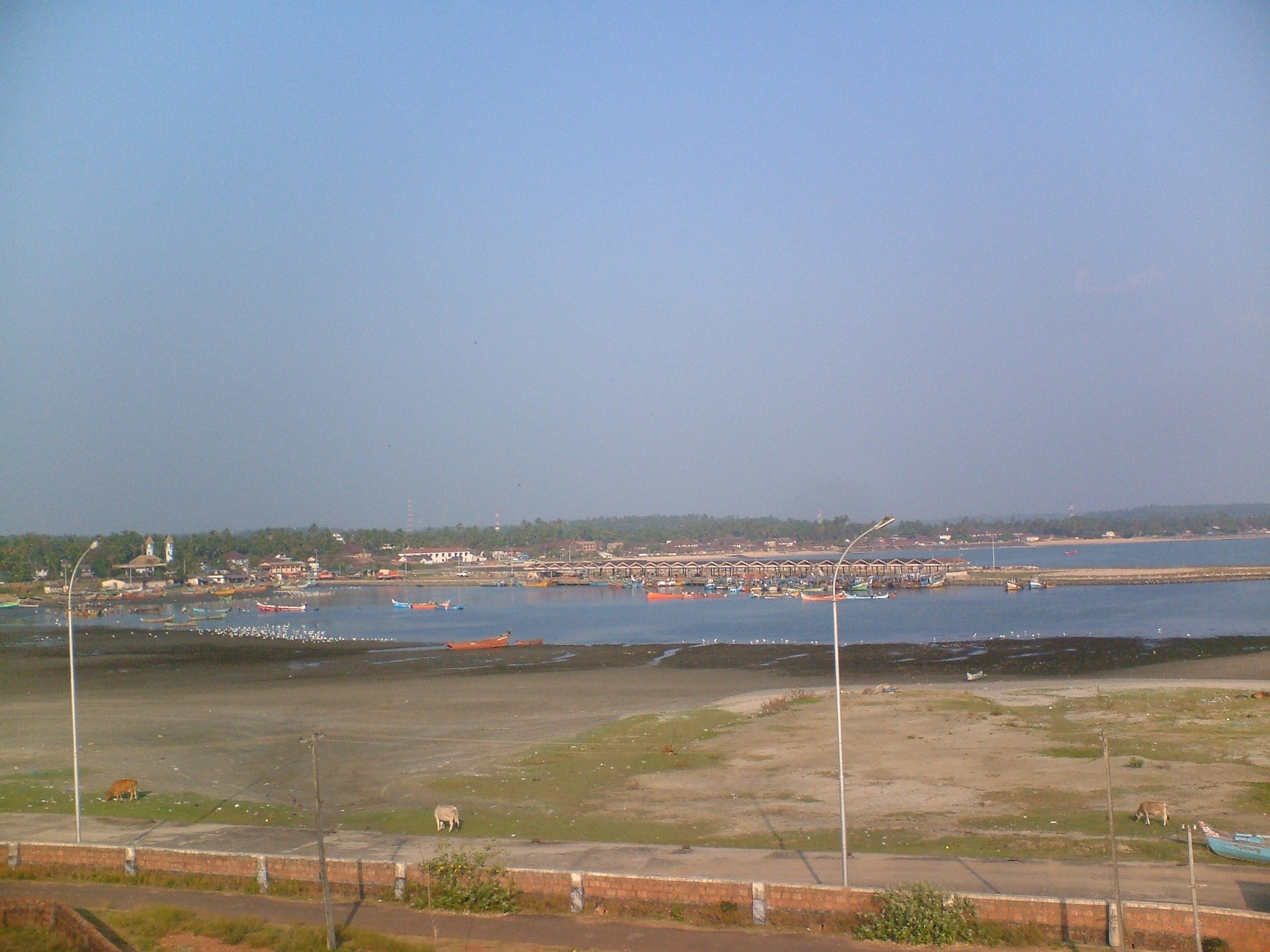
Mappila Bay

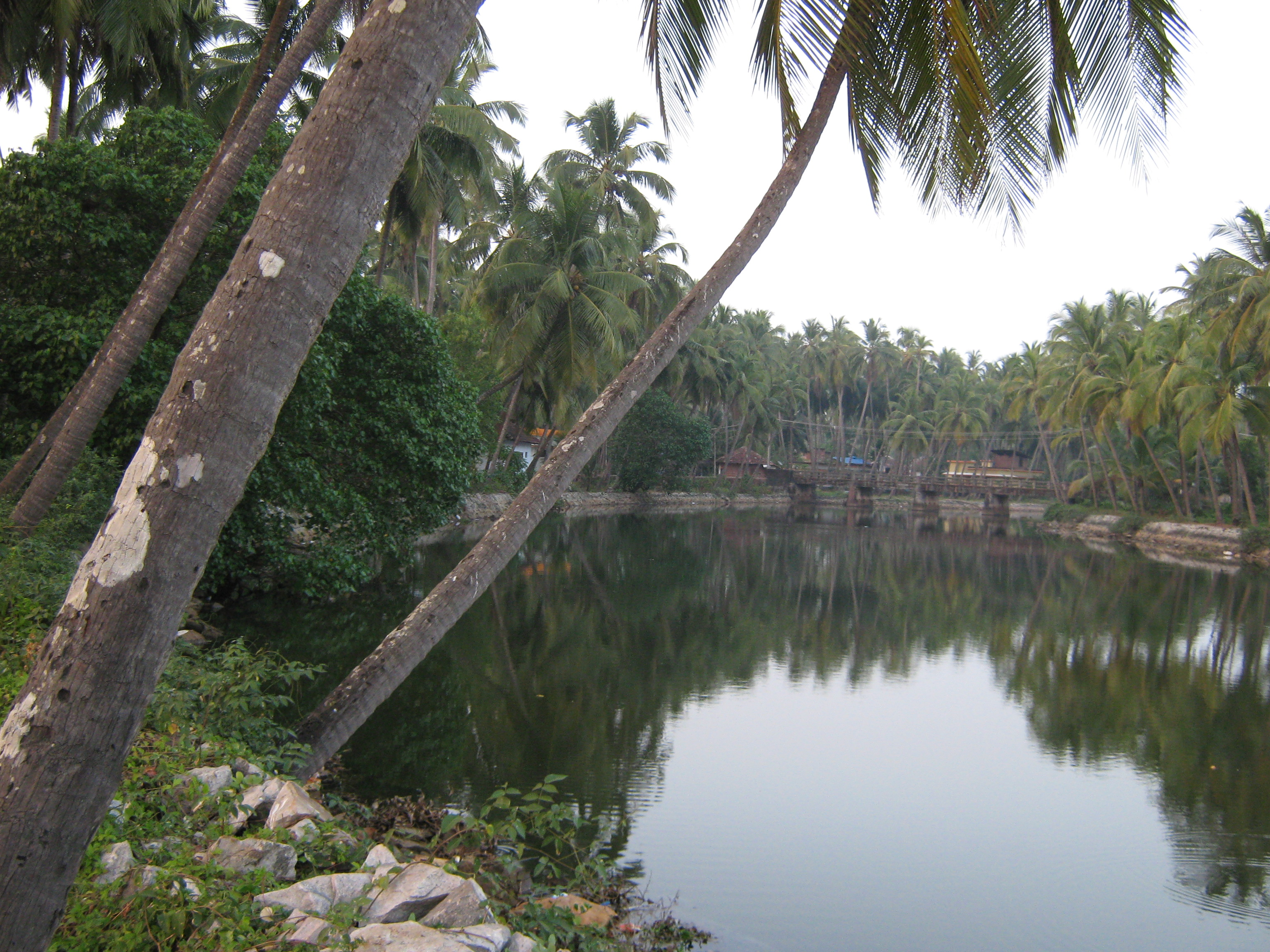
Avera

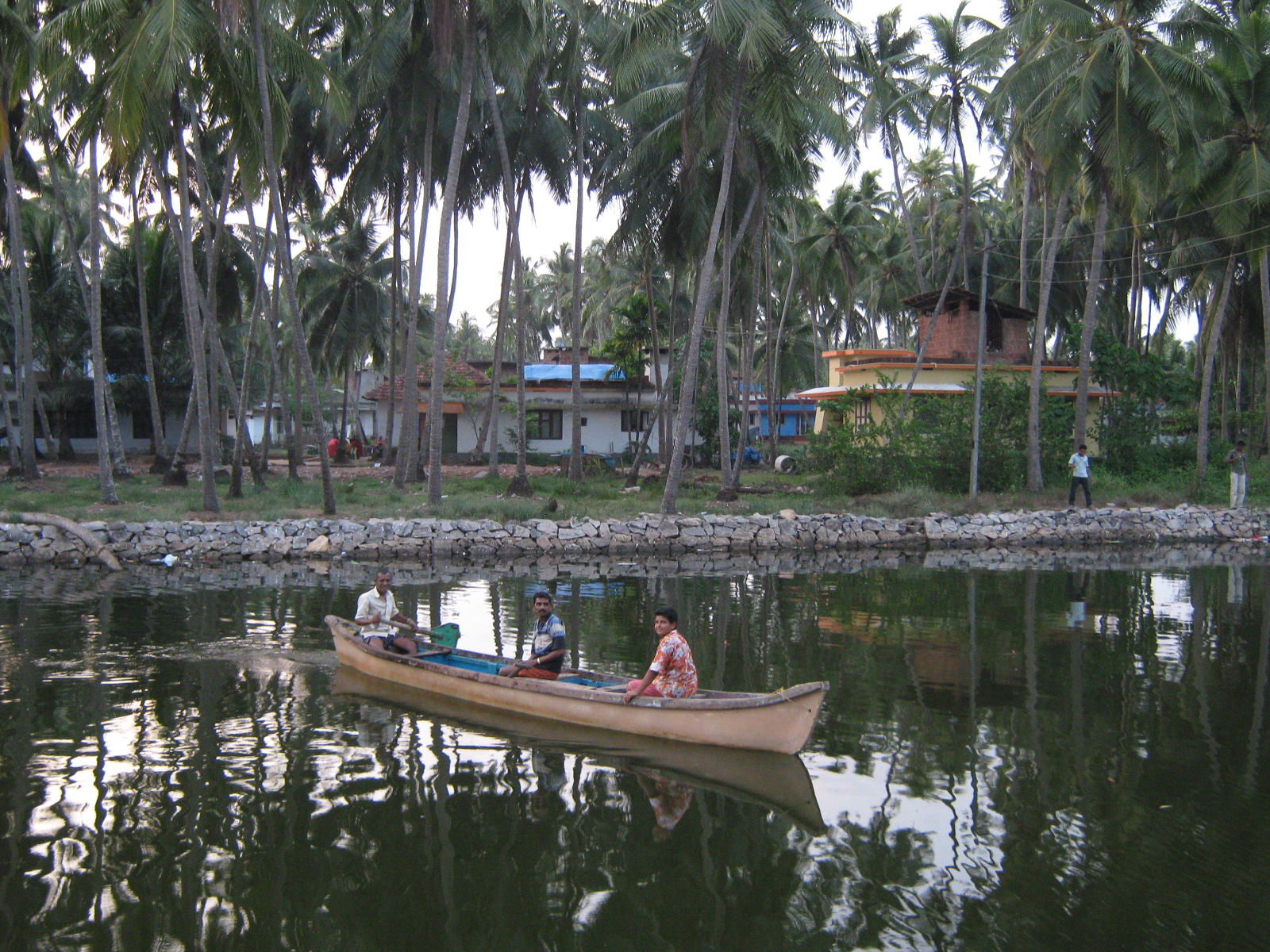
Marakkar Kandy

== See also ==
- Arakkal Museum
- Arakkal family
- Kannur City
