= Arakkal Museum =

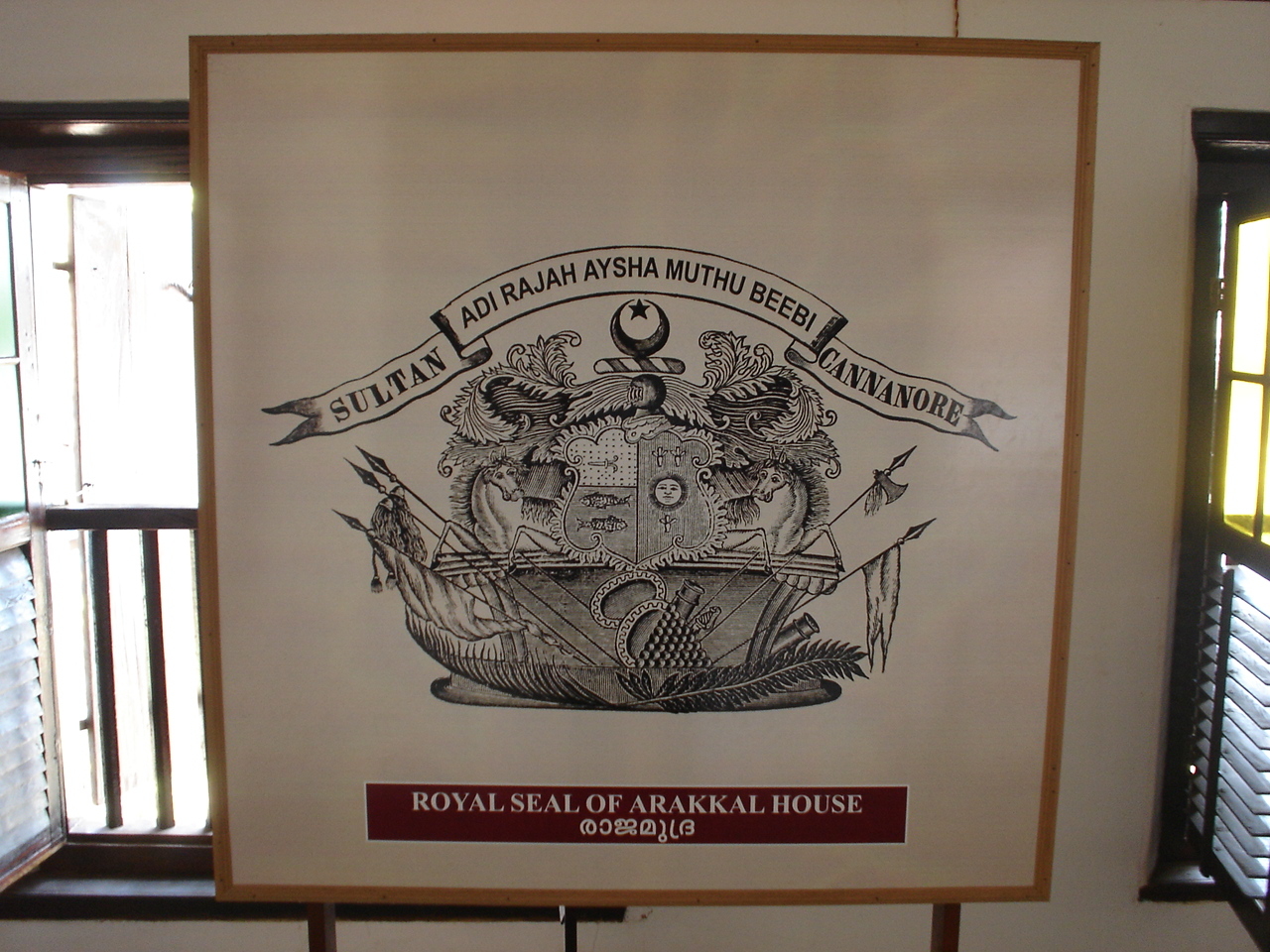
- Seal of Arakkal kingdom

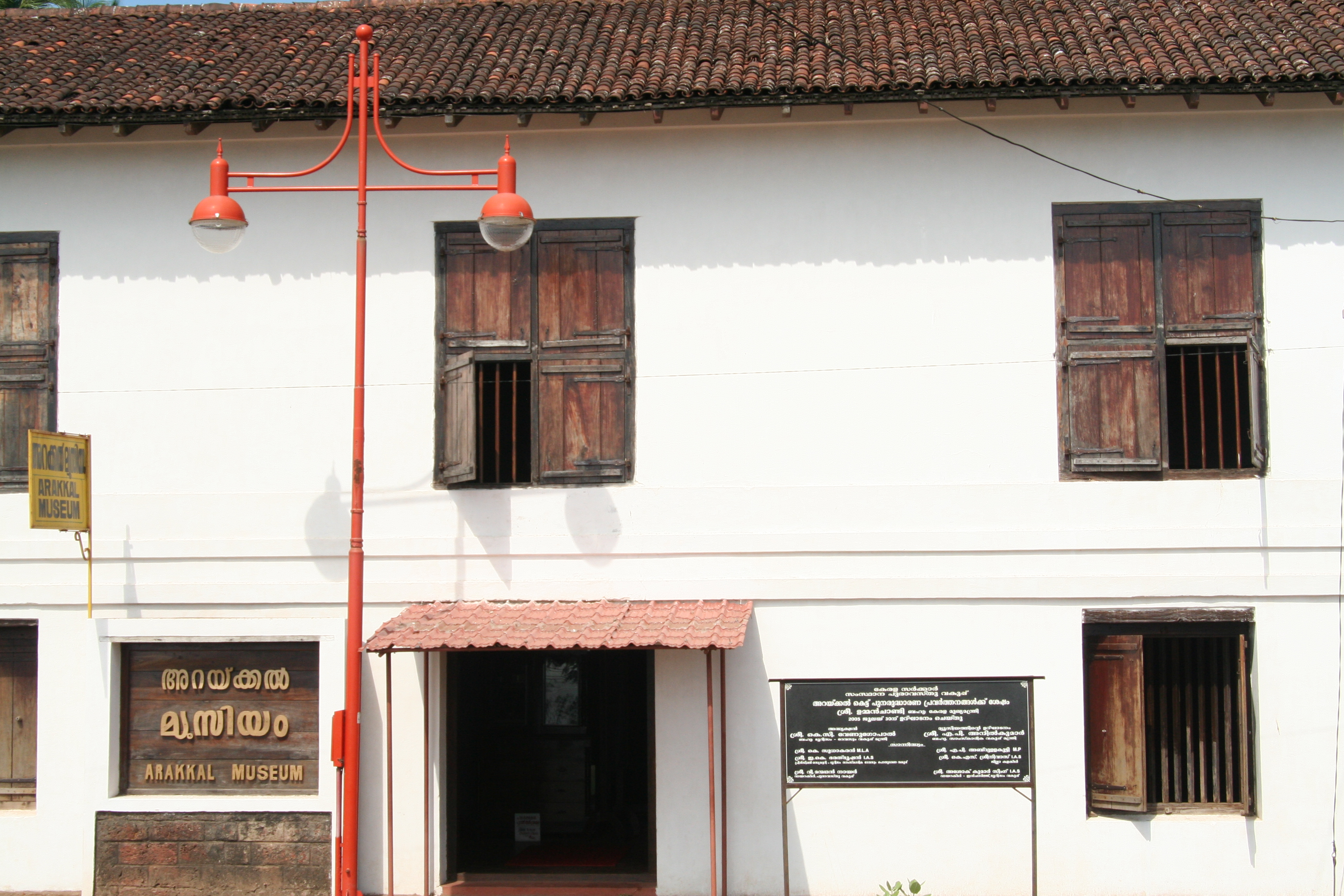
- Front side of the museum
- Former name: Darbar hall of Arakkal
- Established: 1 July 2005
- Location: Kannur
- Coordinates: 11.859505°N 75.3755041°E
- Type: Museum
- Accreditation: Kerala Tourism Development Corporation
- Visitors: 131,56 (2015)
- Owner: Arakkal Royal Trust
- Parking: Onsite(free)

The Arakkal Museum is a museum dedicated to the Arakkal family, the only Muslim royal family in Kerala, India. The museum is actually a section of the Arakkalkettu (Arakkal Royal Palace). The durbar hall section of the palace has been converted into a museum by the Government of Kerala. It was opened in July 2005 after a Rs. 9,000,000 renovation.

Although renovated by the government, the Arakkalkettu is still owned by the Arakkal Royal Trust and does not fall under the control of the Archaeological Survey of India. The government had taken a keen interest in preserving the heritage of the Arakkal Family, which had played a prominent role in the history of Malabar. A nominal entry fee is charged by the Arakkal Royal Trust from visitors to the museum.

== Location ==
The Arakkal Museum is located in Ayikkara, next to the Kannur City. It is located 2-3 kilometres from Kannur town.

== Departments ==
1. Operations
2. Research and Development
3. Communications and Public Informations
4. Protocol and Liaison Service
5. Registration and Permissions

== Photo gallery ==
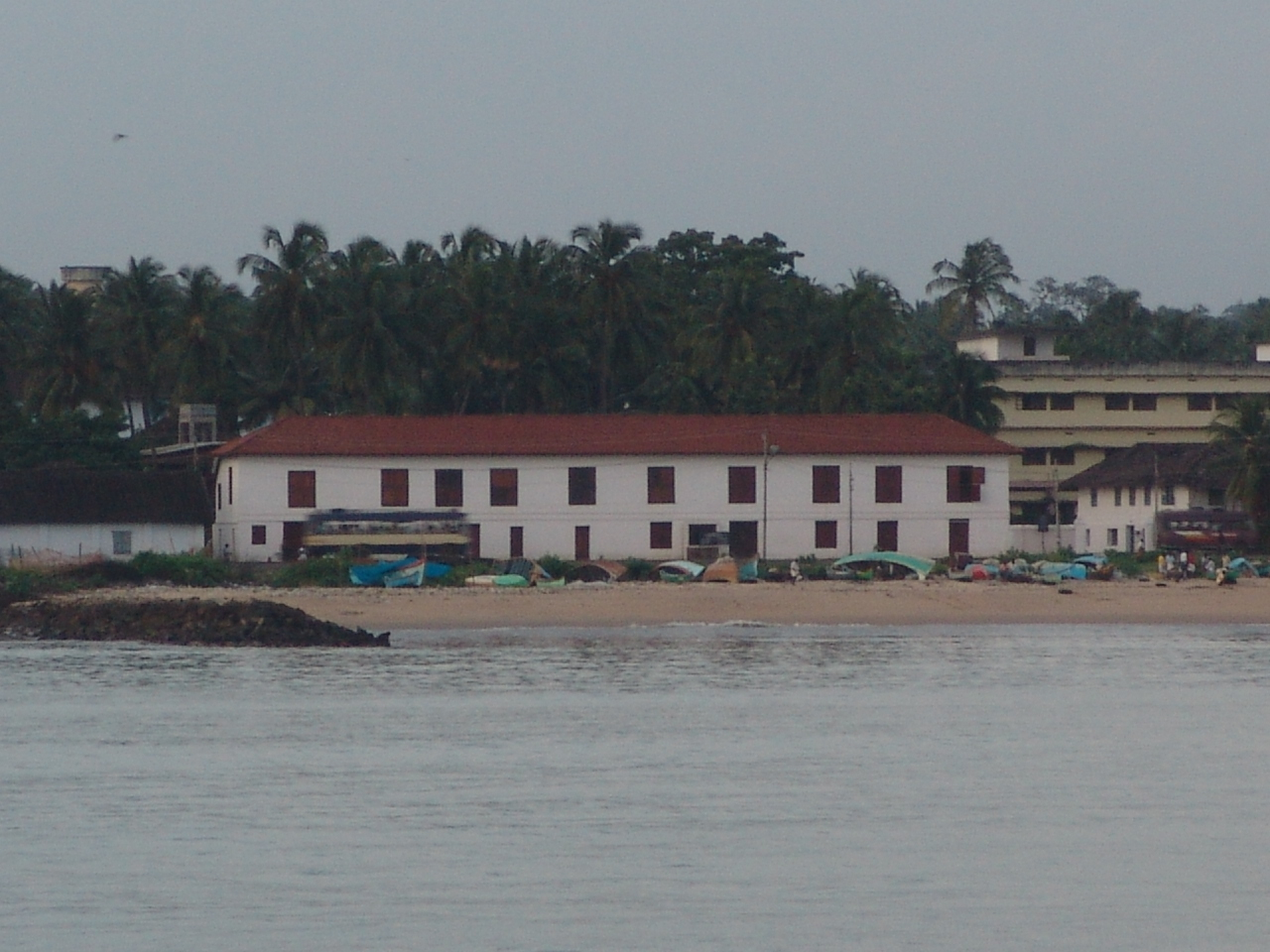
Exterior of the Arakkal museum

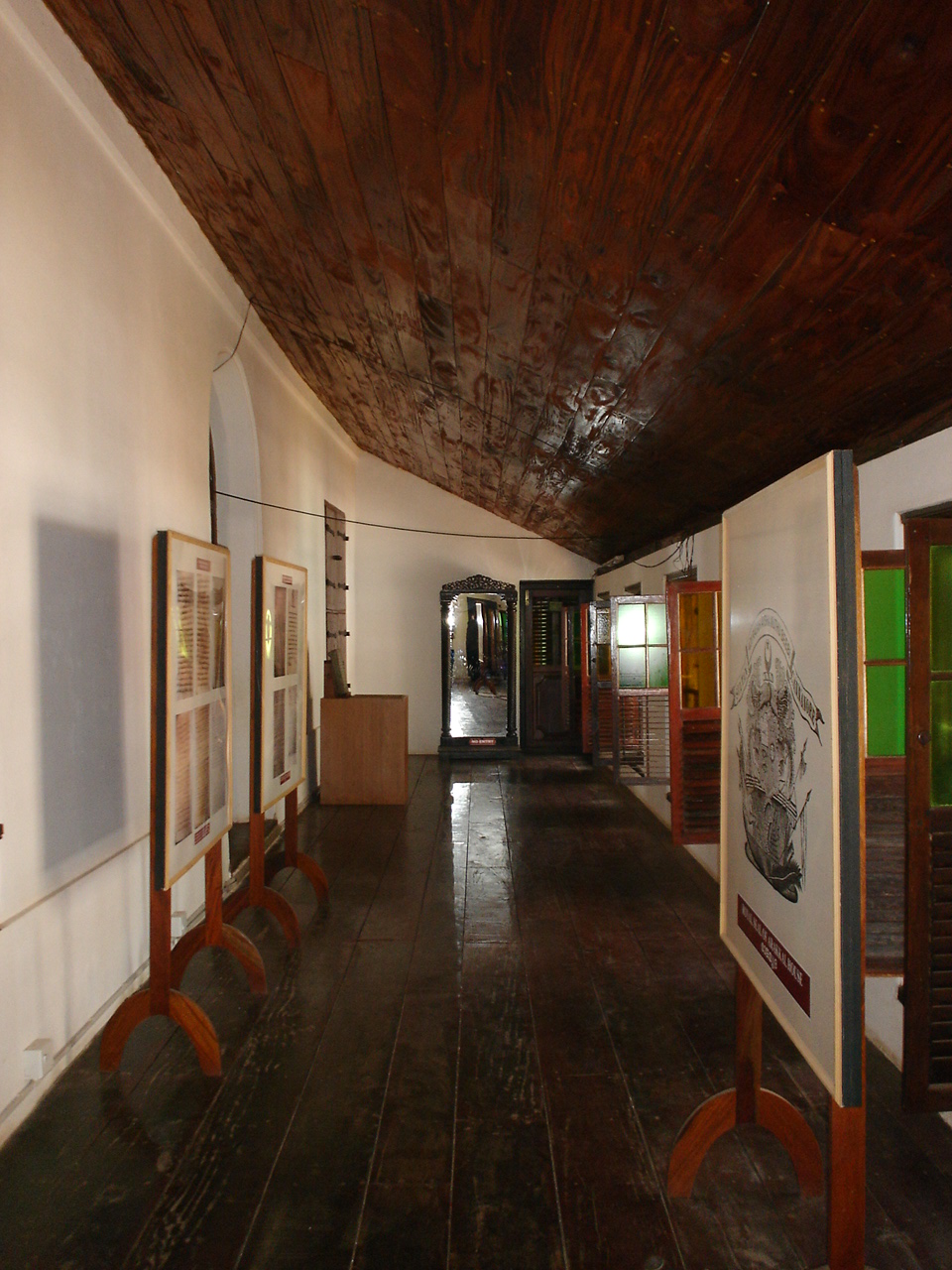
A section of the Museum

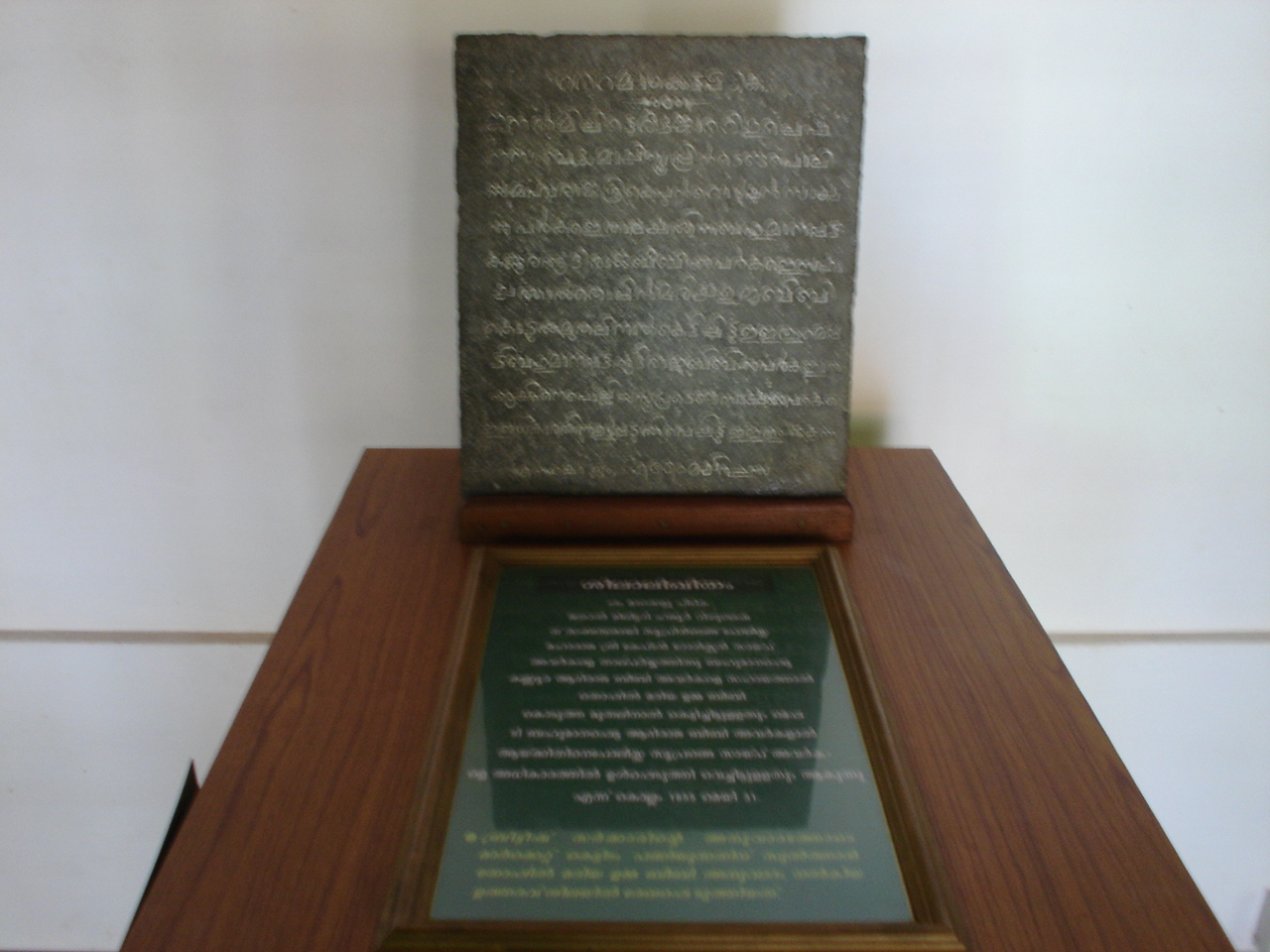
A foundation stone at the Museum

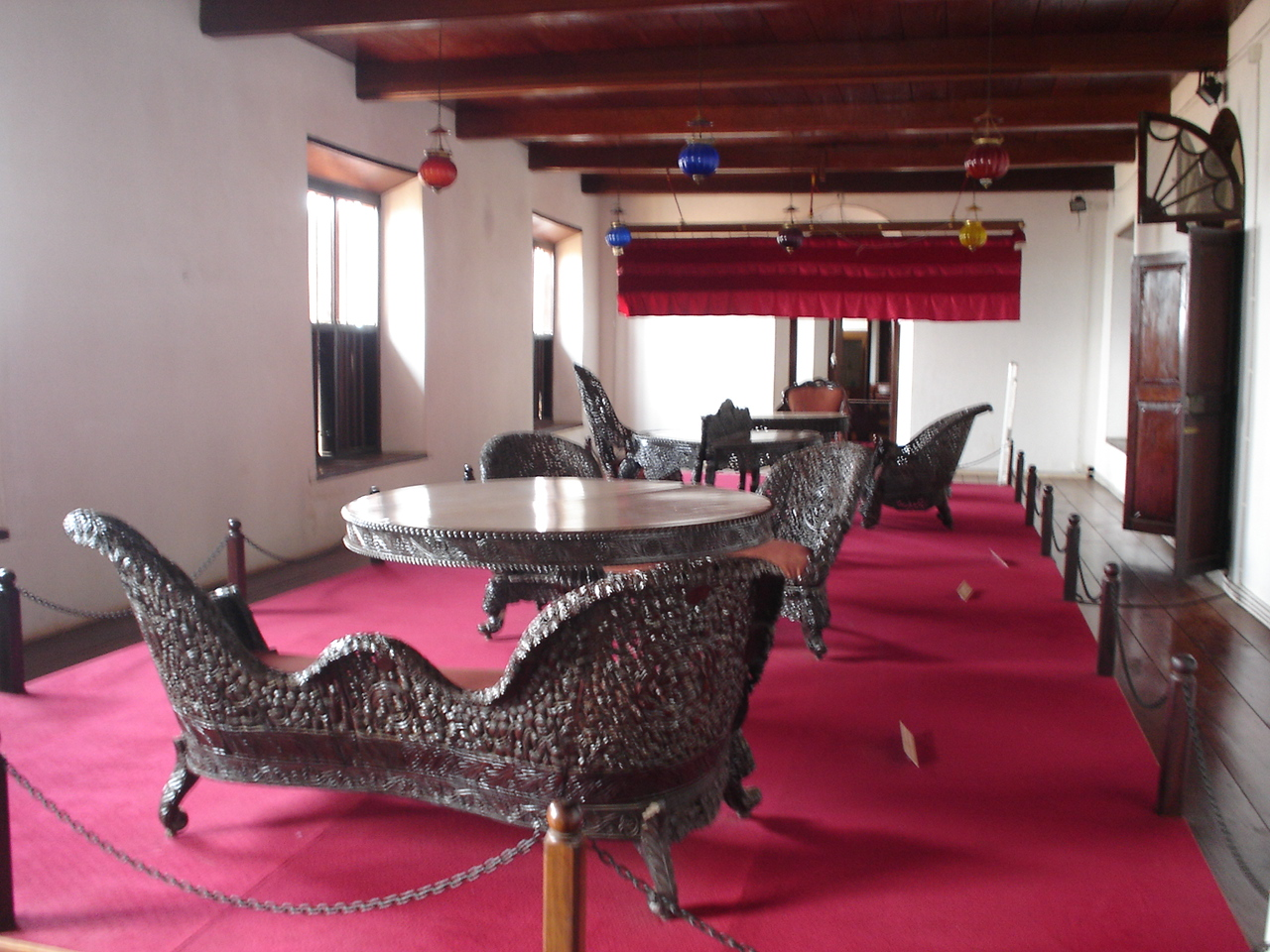
Furniture from the Arakkal Palace

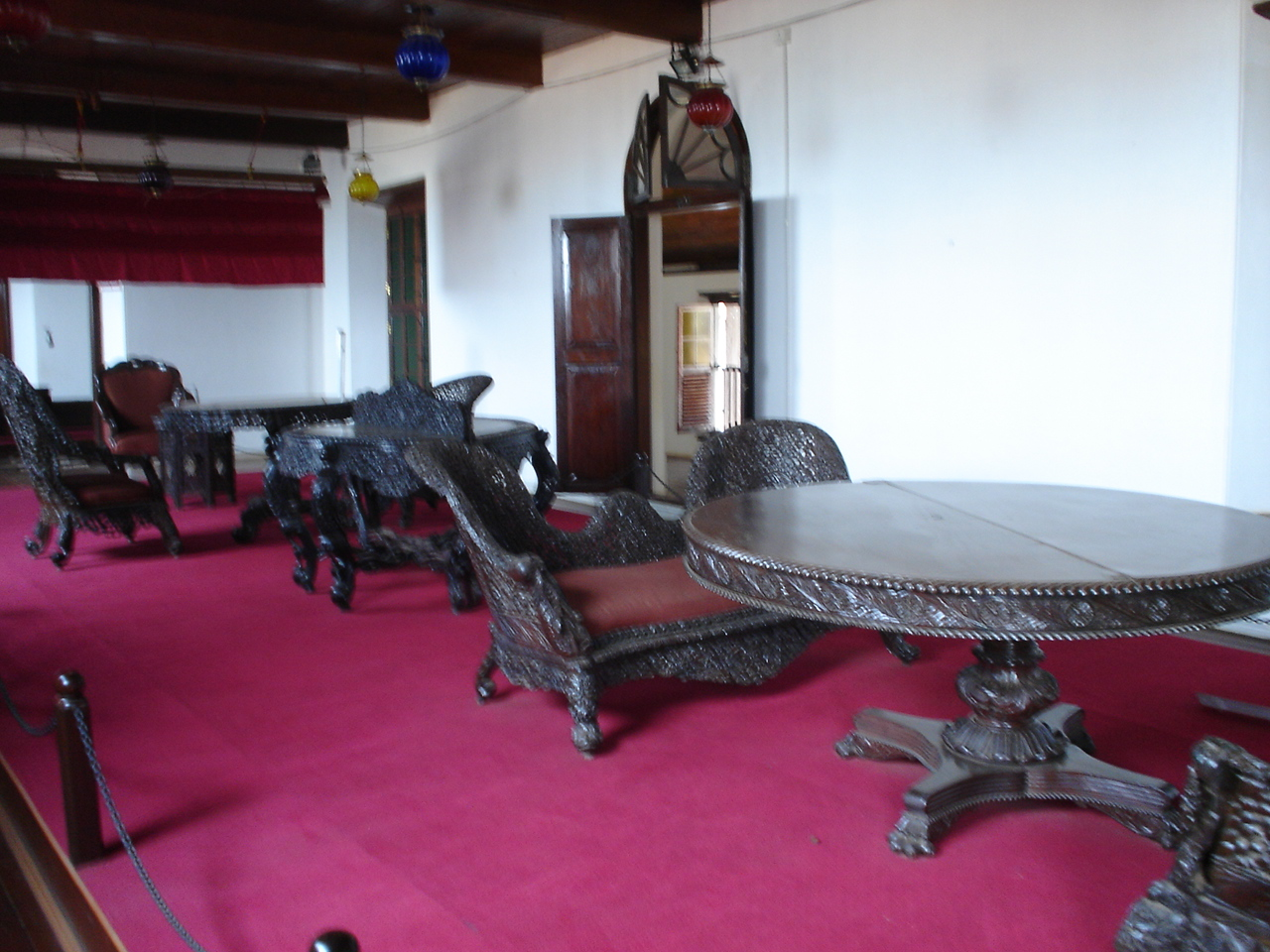
More Arakkal furniture at the museum.

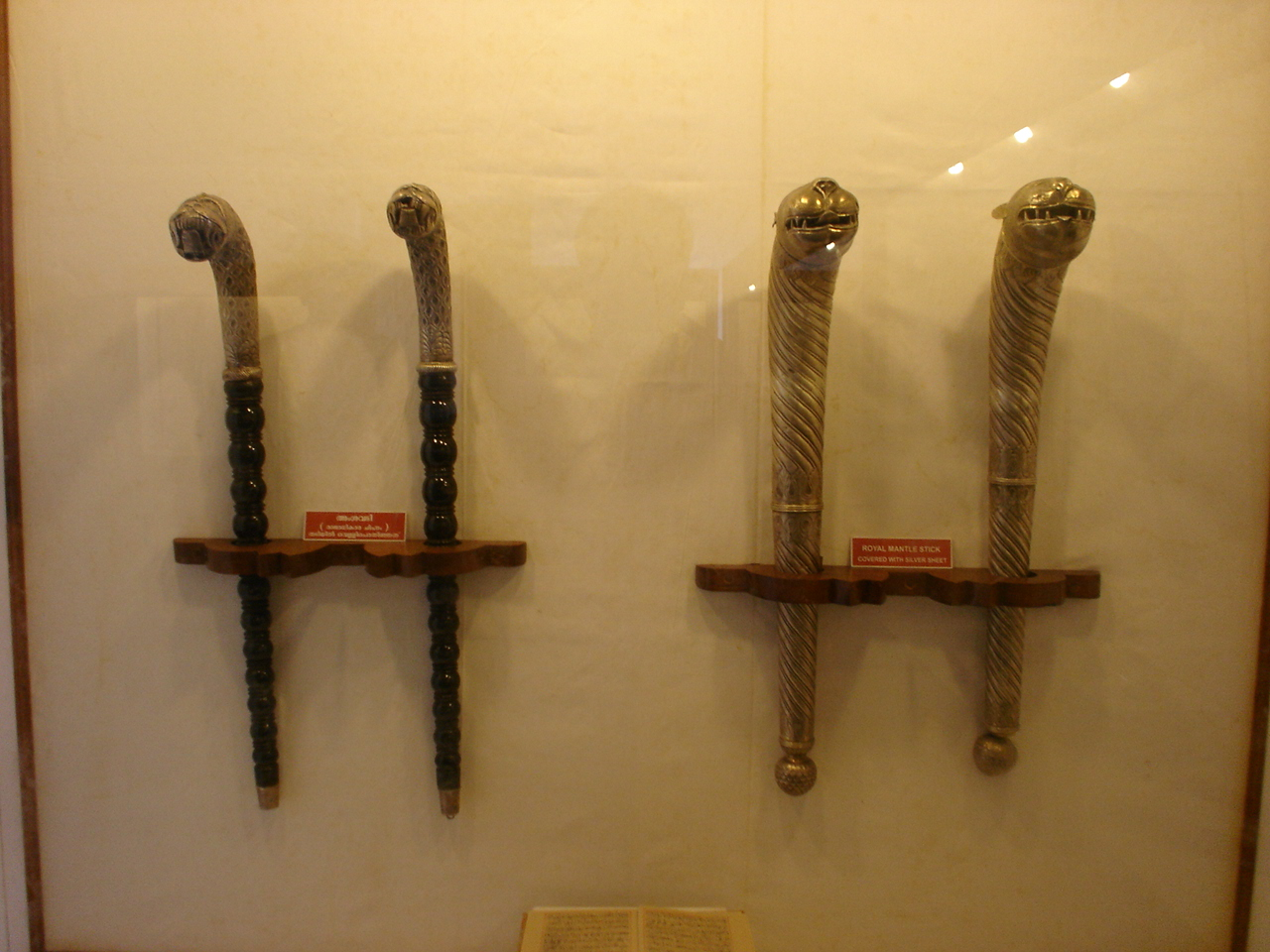
Royal mantle sticks

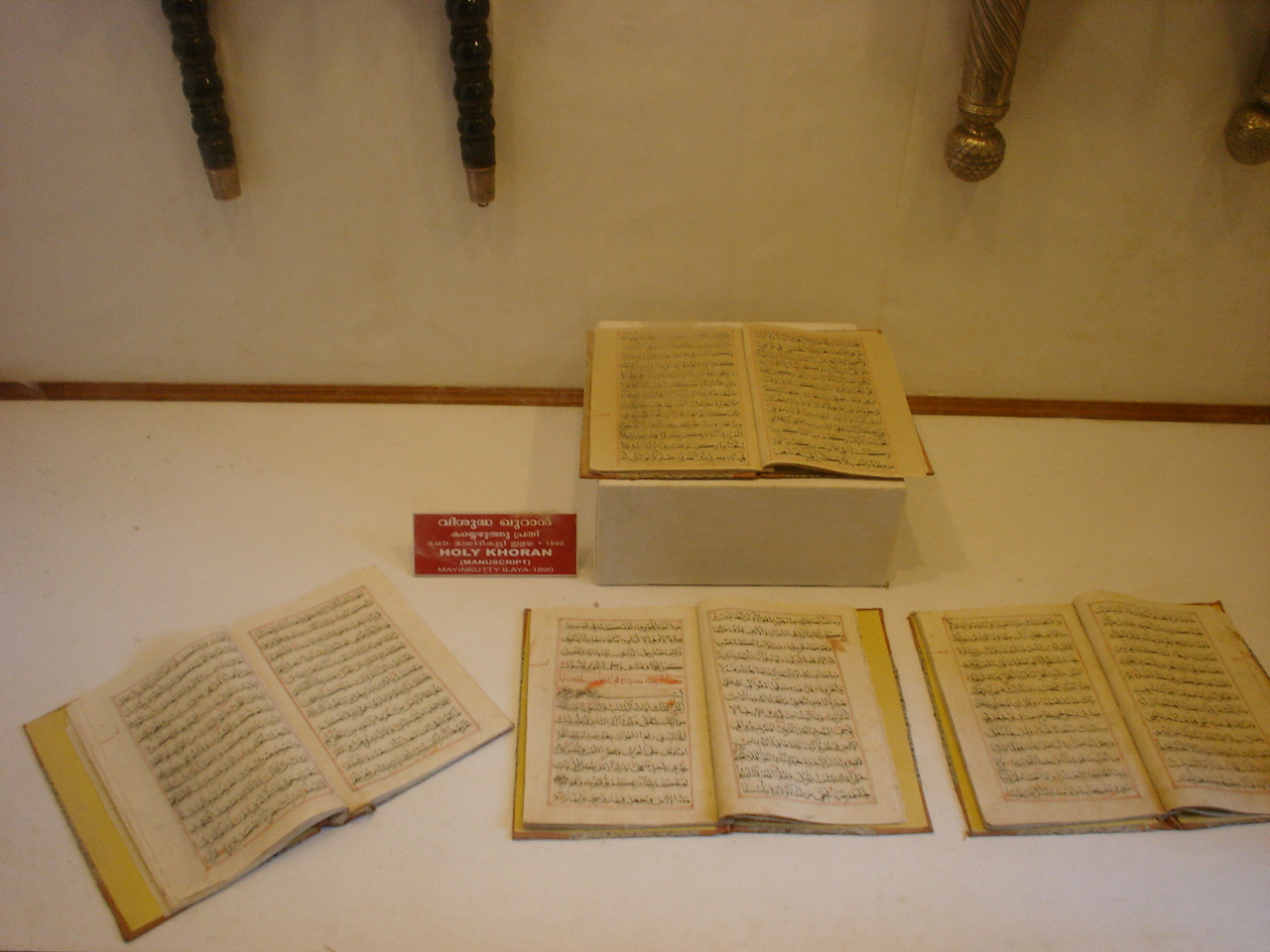
Copies of the Qur'an

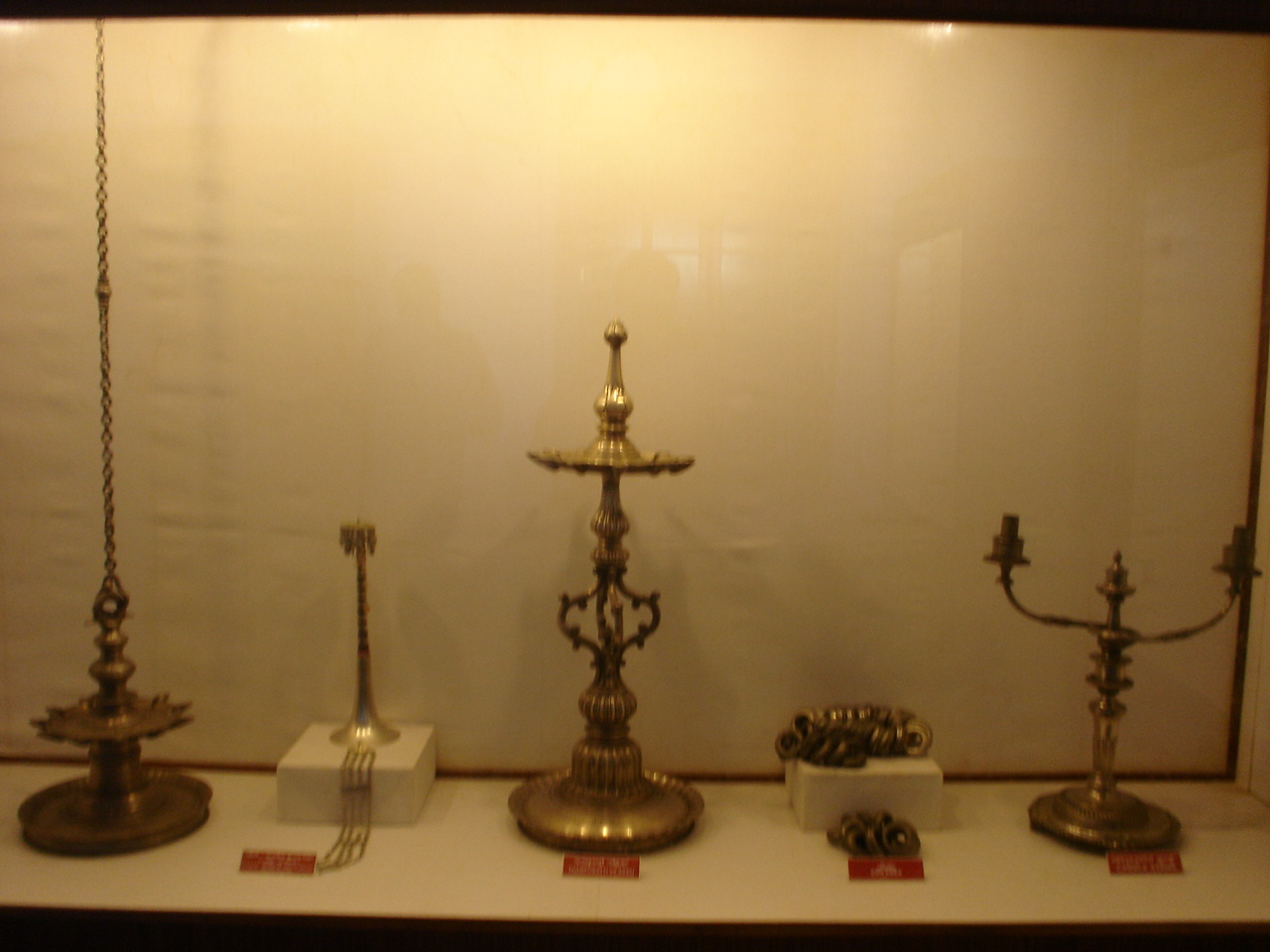
Traditional lamps and candlesticks

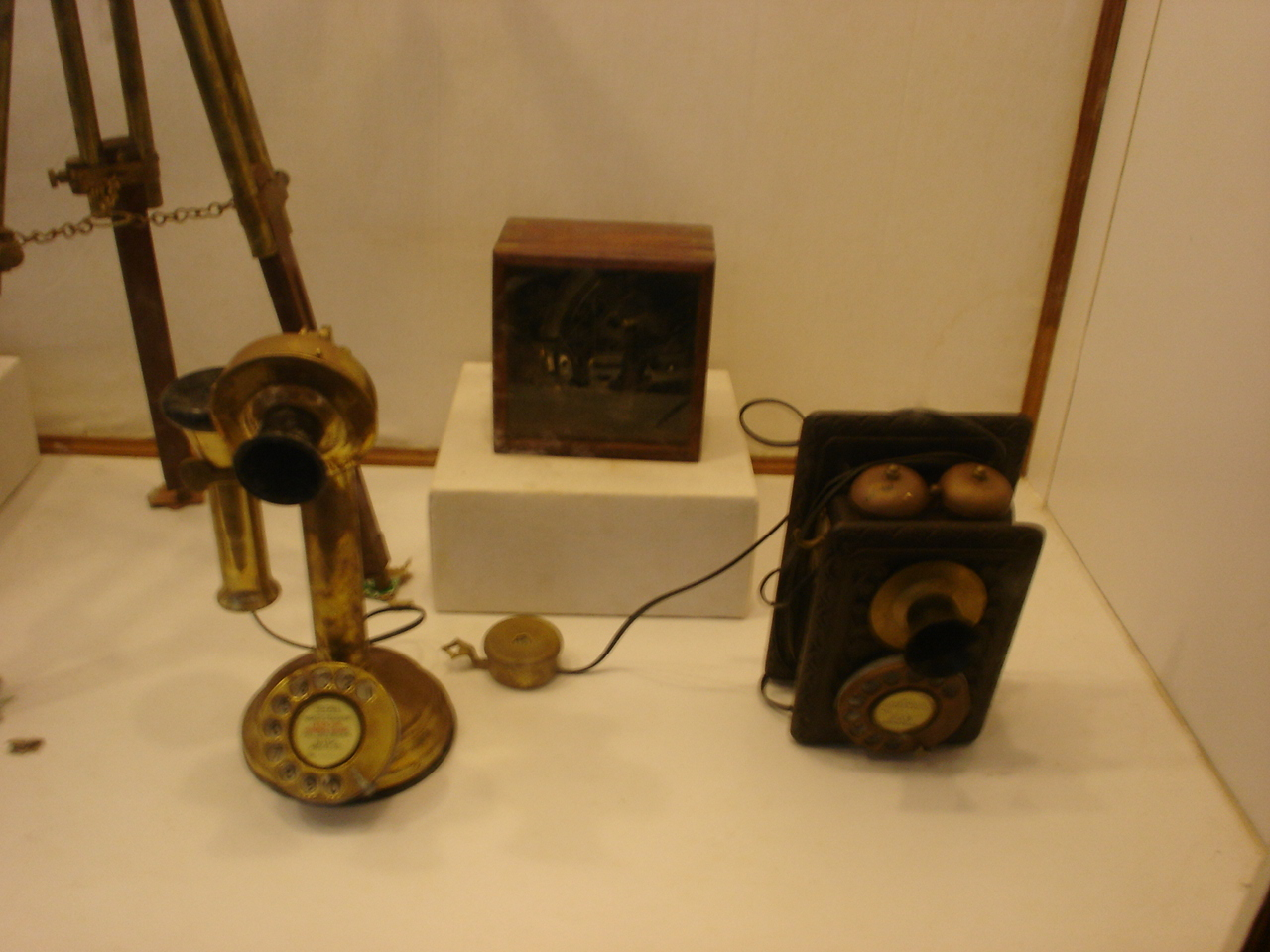
Antique telephones used at Arakkal Palace during the British rule

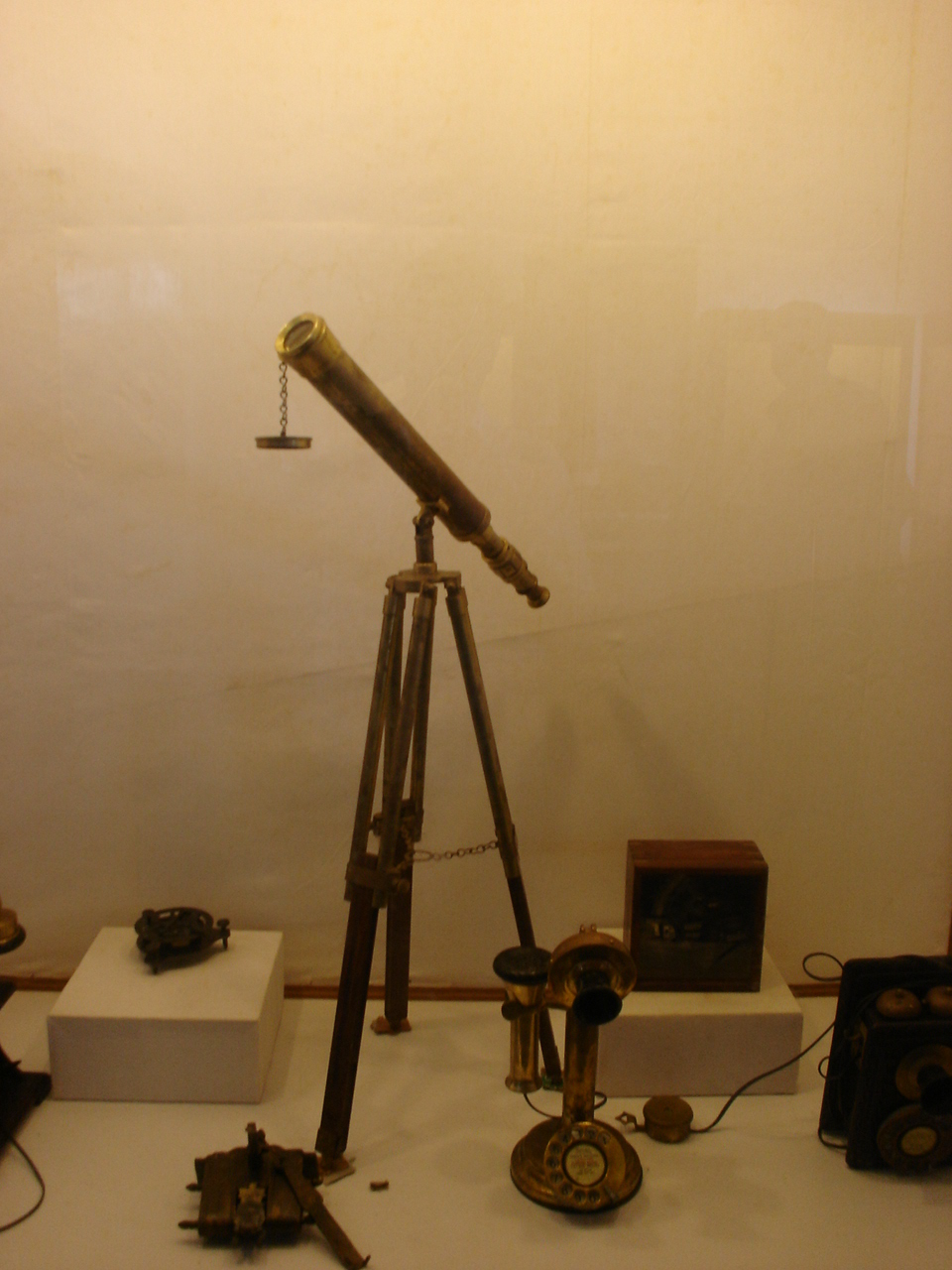
Antique telescope at Arakkal Museum

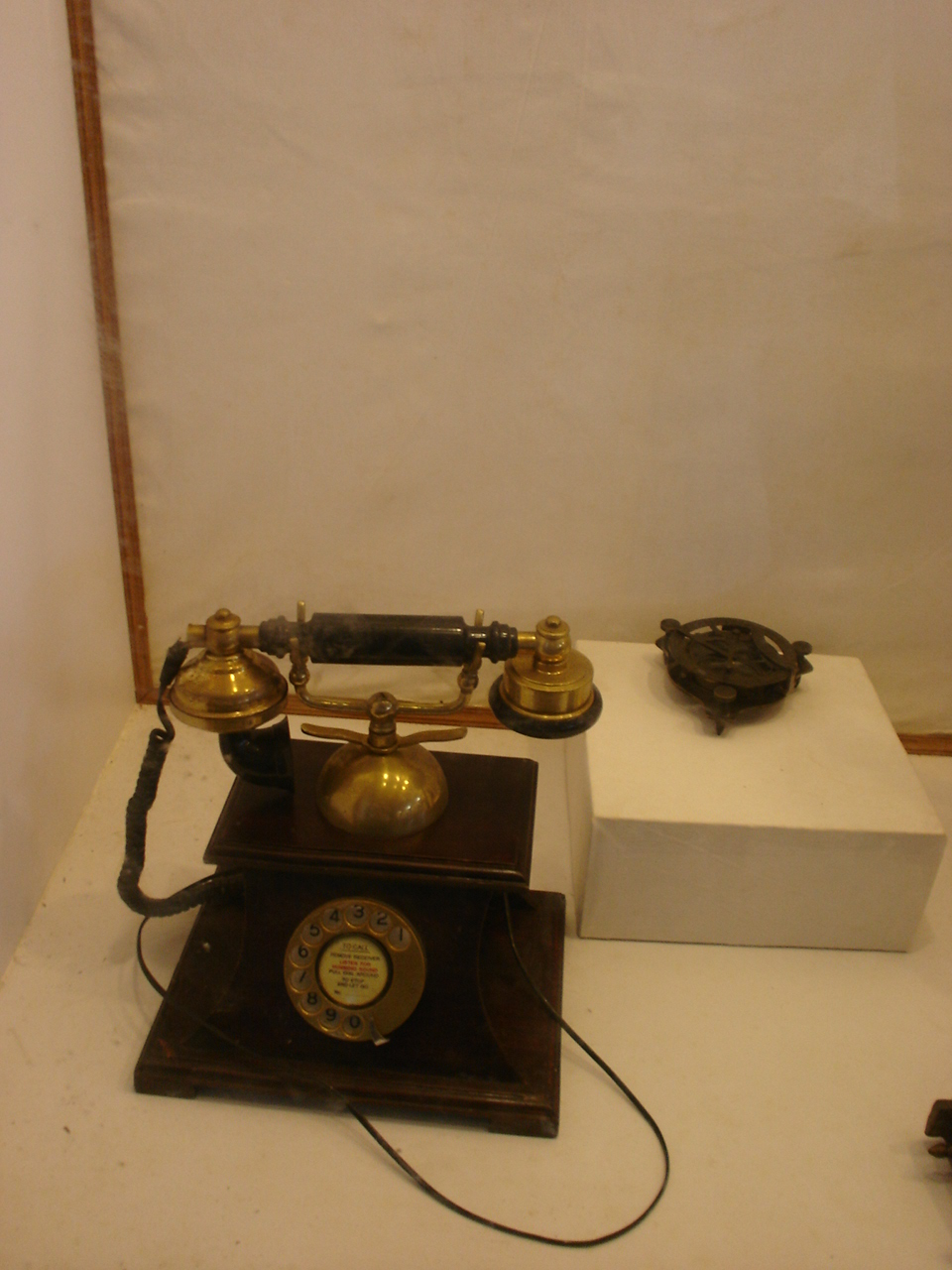
Antique telephone once used in the Arakkal Palace

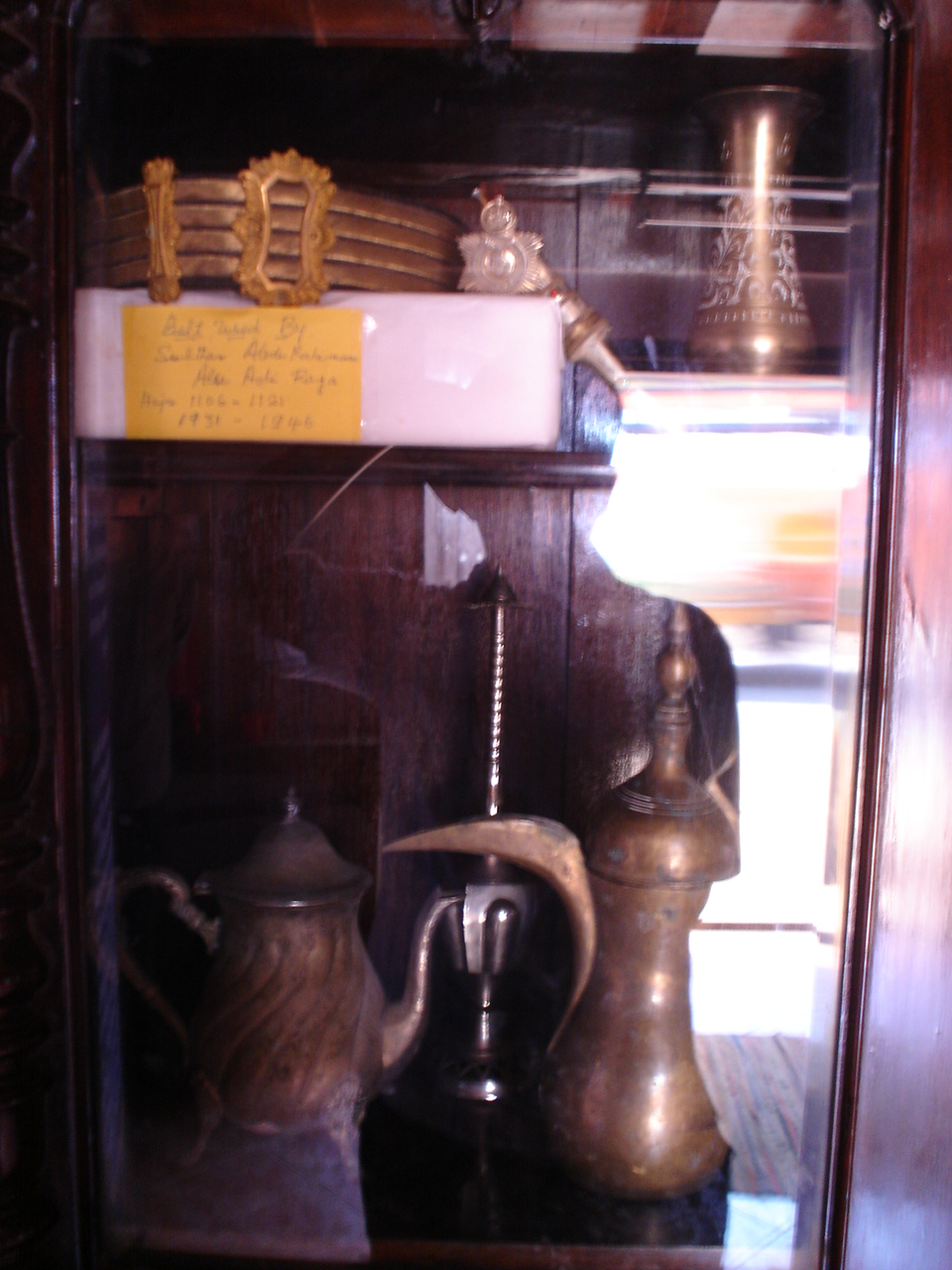
A royal belt and a traditional coffee pot. The design of the coffee pot is influenced by Arab culture.
