= Mappila Bay =

Bay in Kerala, India

Coordinates: 11.856652°N 75.375888°E

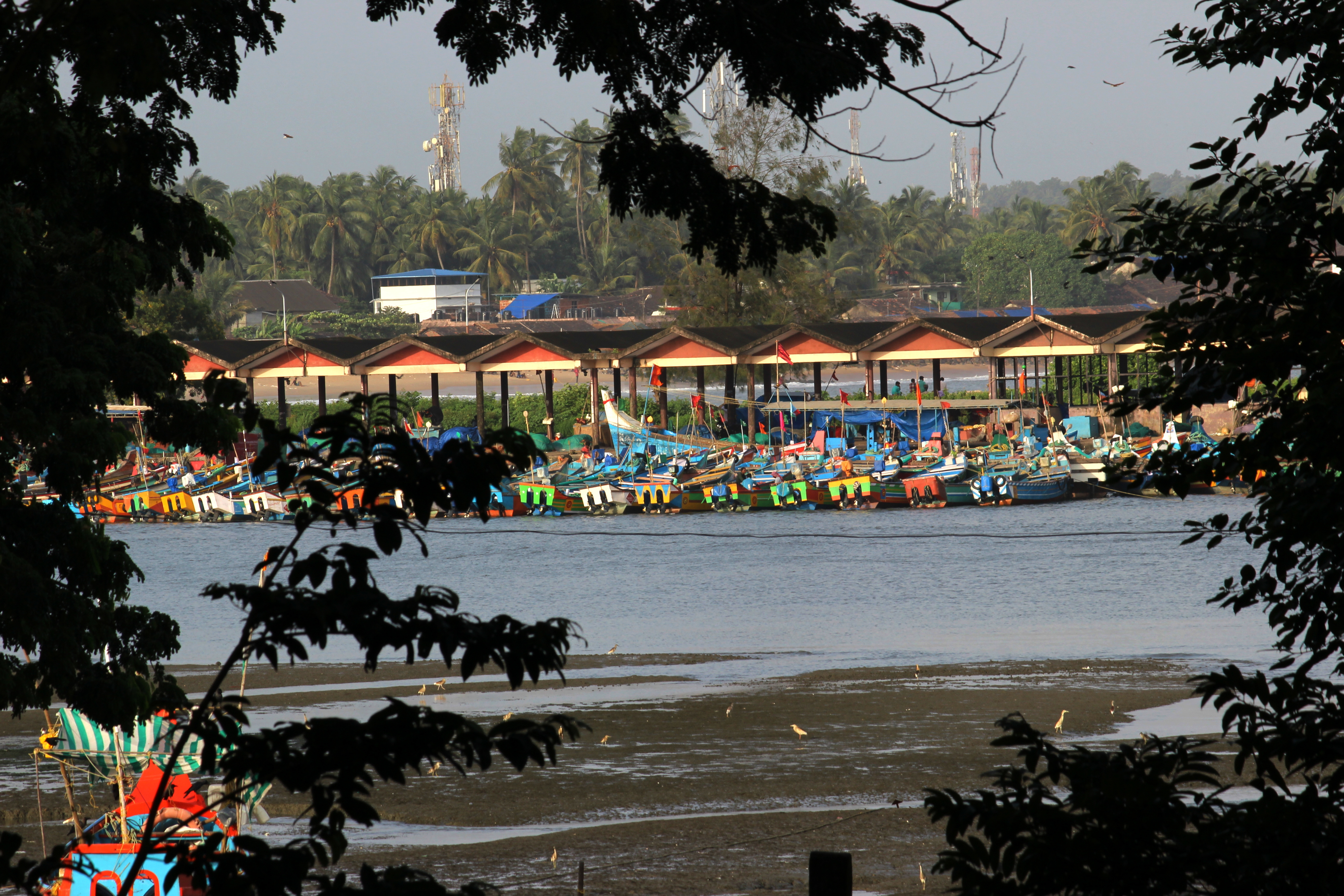
Mappila Bay Fishing harbor

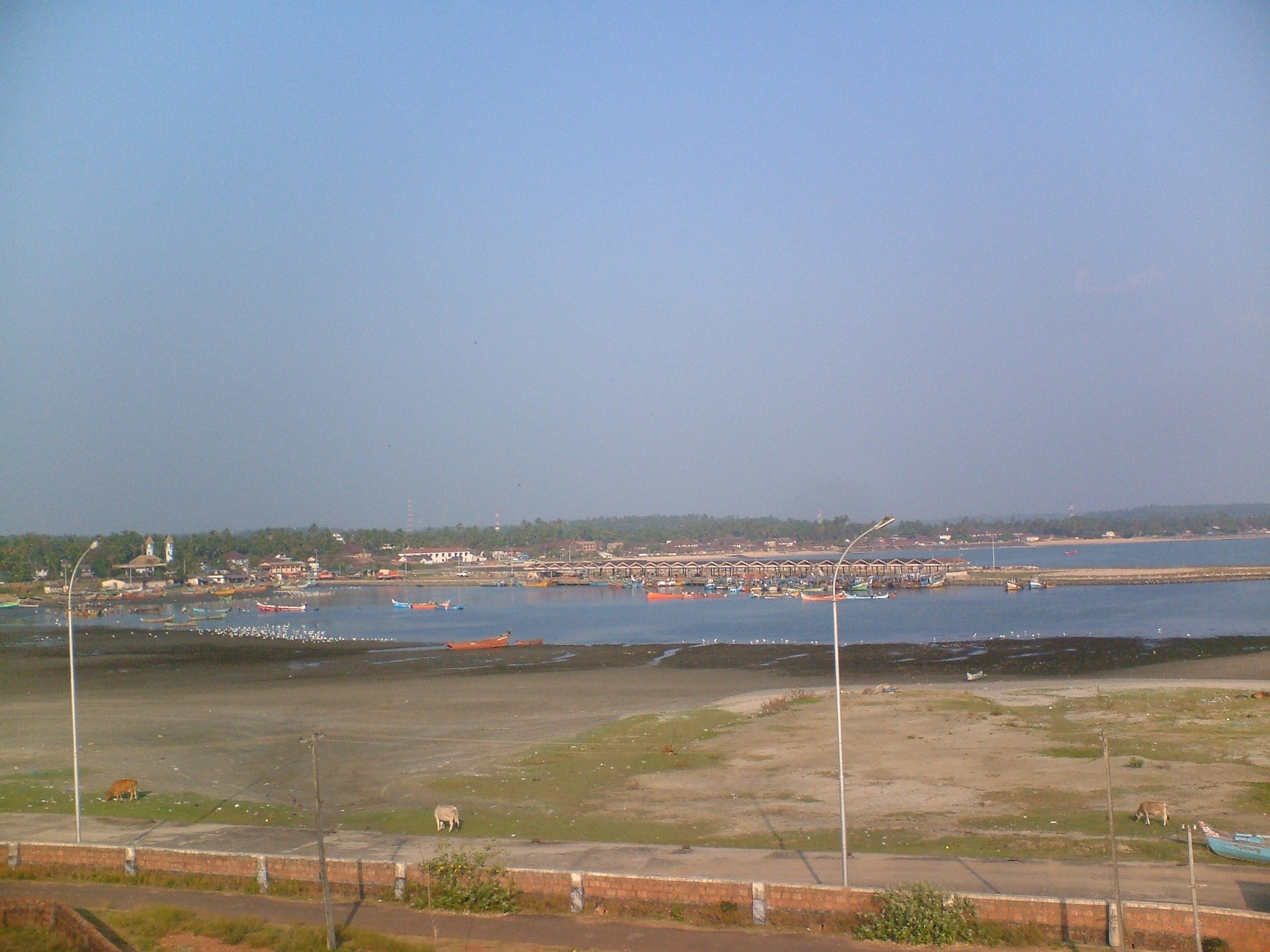
Fishing harbour and the old Arakkal Kingdom in the far

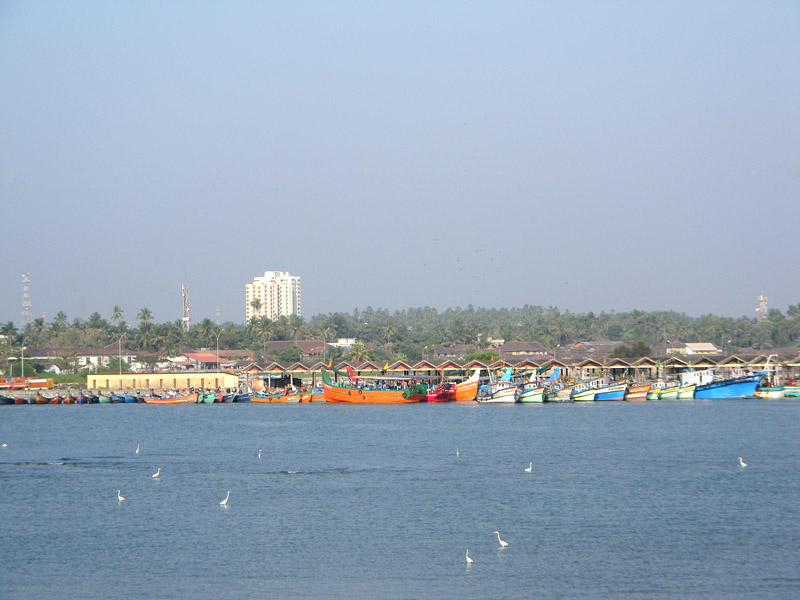
View from Kannur fort.

Mappila Bay (or Moppila Bay) is a natural harbor situated at Ayikkara in Kannur Municipal Corporation, Kerala state of South India. On one side of the bay is Fort St. Angelo, built by the Portuguese in the 15th century and the other side is the Arakkal Palace.

The bay was famous during the Kolathiri's regime as a commercial harbour that linked Kolathunadu with Lakshadweep and foreign countries, in imports.

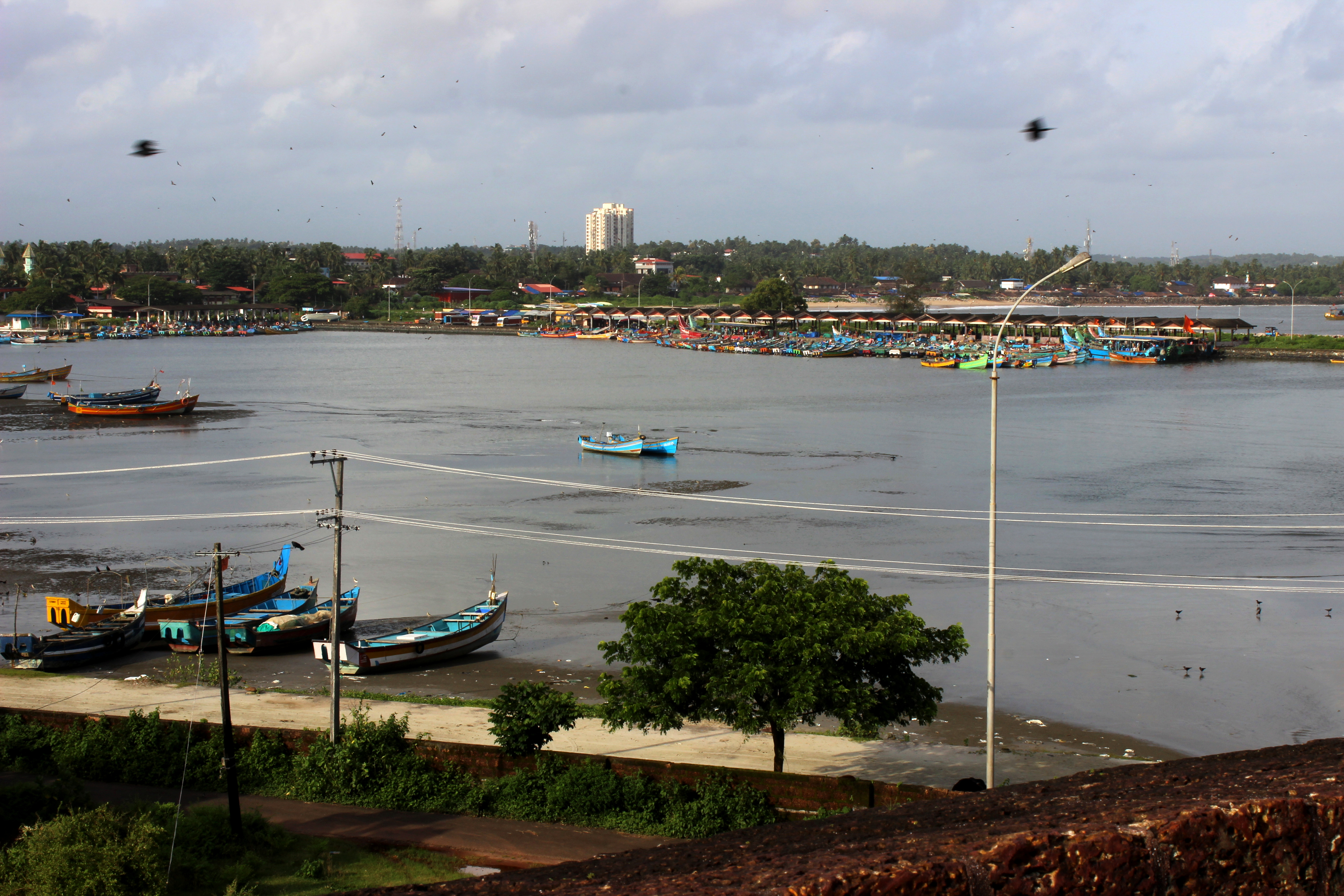
Another View of the Harbour from Kannur Fort

== See also ==
- Ayikkara
- St. Angelo Fort
- Arakkal Kingdom
- Cannanore Lighthouse
- Kannur
