= Fort Road =

Fort Road may refer to:

- Fort Road, Edmonton, a road in Alberta, Canada
- Minnesota State Highway 5, US, known as Fort Road
- Fort Road Bridge, a bridge spanning the Mississippi River in Minnesota, US
- Fort Road, Kannur, a road in Kerala, India
- Fort Road, Lahore, a road in the Old Walled City of Lahore, Pakistan
  - Fort Road Food Street, Lahore, Punjab, Pakistan

== See also ==
- Fortified gateway, a road fort for controlling passage on a road
- "Fort in the Road", an episode of Amphibia
- Fort (disambiguation)
- Road (disambiguation)
- Fort Street (disambiguation)
- Fort Avenue (disambiguation)
