= Fortress (disambiguation) =

A fortress is a fortification, a defensive military construction.

Fortress or The Fortress may also refer to:

== Places ==
- Fortress Pass, a pass on Baffin Island, Nunavut, Canada
- The Fortress (Alberta), a mountain in Canada
  - Fortress Mountain Resort, Alberta
- The Fortress (Antarctica), a geological formation

== Arts, entertainment, and media ==
=== Comics ===
- Fortress (comics), a character from Image Comics

=== Films ===
- The Fortress (1947 film), written by George Zuckerman
- Fortress (1985 film), an Australian thriller film directed by Arch Nicholson
- Fortress (1992 film), a science fiction action film starring Christopher Lambert directed by Stuart Gordon
- The Fortress (1979 film) (Az erőd), a 1979 Hungarian science fiction film
- The Fortress (1994 film) (Pevnost), a 1994 Czech film by Drahomíra Vihanová
- Fortress (2012 film), a war film directed by Michael R. Phillips
- The Fortress (2017 film) (Namhan Sansong), a 2017 South Korean film
- Fortress (2021 film), an American film starring Bruce Willis
  - Fortress: Sniper's Eye, a 2022 sequel

=== Games ===
- Fortress (chess), an endgame drawing technique
- Fortress (solitaire), a solitaire or patience playing card game
- Fortress (1983 video game) for Atari 8-bit computers and Apple II
- Fortress (1984 video game) for the BBC Micro
- Fortress (2001 video game) for the Game Boy Advance
- Fortress (2001 online video game), South Korean online game
- Fortress (cancelled video game), code name for a cancelled game circa 2008
- "Fortress," the English translation of the Yagura opening in shogi

=== Literature ===
- Fortress, a 1980 novel by Gabrielle Lord, on which the 1985 film was based
- The Fortress (Die Festung), a 1962 semi-autobiographical prison novel by Henry Jaeger
- The Fortress (Tvrđava), a 1970 Yugoslav novel by Meša Selimović
- The Fortress, a 1956 book by Raleigh Trevelyan
- The Fortress, a 1932 novel by Hugh Walpole
- Fortress Press, an imprint of 1517 Media

=== Music ===
- Fortress (Alter Bridge album), 2013
- Fortress (Miniature Tigers album), 2010
- Fortress (Protest the Hero album), 2008
- Fortress (Sister Hazel album), 2000
- "Fortress" (Thee Oh Sees song), 2016
- "Fortress", a song by Bloc Party from Hymns
- "Fortress", a song by Dala from This Moment Is a Flash
- "Fortress", a song by Illenium from Ashes
- "Fortress", a song by Robert Forster from Warm Nights

=== Television ===
- "The Fortress" (Flashpoint), an episode of Flashpoint
- "The Fortress" (How I Met Your Mother), a 2013 episode of How I Met Your Mother
- "The Fortress" (Joe 90), an episode of Joe 90
- The Fortress (TV show), a Norwegian TV show, aired on Viaplay

== Other uses ==
- Fortress (programming language), a Sun Microsystems language
- Fortress Investment Group, an asset management firm
- "The Fortress," the nickname for T-Mobile Arena in Las Vegas, Nevada in honor its primary tenant, the Vegas Golden Knights

== See also ==
- Castle (disambiguation)
- Estadio Ciudad de Lanús – Néstor Díaz Pérez, widely known as "La Fortaleza", a multi-use stadium in Lanús, Argentina
- Fort (disambiguation)
- La Fortaleza ("The Fortress"), the official residence of the governor of Puerto Rico
