= Kannur Cantonment =

- Neighbourhood
- Location in Kerala, India
- Coordinates: 11.862101°N 75.363722°E
- Country: India
- State: Kerala
- District: Kannur

Area
  - Total: 1.79 km^{2} (0.69 sq mi)

Population (2011)
  - Total: 4,798
  - Density: 2,680/km^{2} (6,940/sq mi)

Languages
  - Official: Malayalam, English
- Time zone: UTC+5:30 (IST)
- ISO 3166 code: IN-KL

Kannur Cantonment (or Cannanore Cantonment the old English name), situated in Burnassery or Burnshire(the anglicized name), is a cantonment town in Kannur district in the Indian state of Kerala, between Kannur town and Kannur City. The cantonment was a military camp for Portuguese, Dutch and British rulers, and is now the headquarters of Defence Security Corps.

The Kannur Cantonment Board is one of the 62 cantonments in India and the only one in Kerala. The cantonment at Kannur falls in the Class III category. Defence offices such the Defence Security Corps Centre, Defence Security Corps Record, Defence Security Corps Pay Accounts Office and DPDO Kannur are located here. It is home to St. Angelo Fort, Holy Trinity Cathedral and St. Thomas Orthodox Church.

== History ==
The Kannur Cantonment was established in the 19th century by the British. Cantonments were established during the British era usually in their military areas where both civilian and military personnel resided. It was under the control of the Arakkal Kingdom until 1909, when the Arakkal Beevi, Rani Imbichi Adi-Raja Bibi lost it to the British.

After Indian Independence, the Kannur Cantonment came under the control of the Indian Army. It is now a prominent and strategic location for the Indian armed forces.

== Demographics ==
As of 2011 India census, Kannur Cantonment had a population of 4,798. Males constitute 65% of the population and females 35%. Kannur Cantonment has an average literacy rate of 89%, higher than the national average of 74%: male literacy is 92%, and female literacy is 84%. In Kannur Cantonment, 8% of the population is under 6 years of age. The majority of the Anglo-Indian community lives in the Kannur Cantonment and the surrounding areas of Thillery, No.3 Bazaar and Camp Bazaar.

== Kannur Cantonment Board ==
The Kannur Cantonment Board came into existence in 1938. This cantonment consists of 2698 civilians and 2121 military population. The Board consists of 12 members. Six of them are elected from the civilian population. The Officer-in-Command is the chairman of the Board.

== Education ==
Some of the notable schools situated in the Cannanore Cantonment are St, Michael's Anglo Indian Higher Secondary School Kannur St Teresa's Anglo Indian Higher Secondary School Kannur, Ursuline Convent School, B E M P Upper Primary School, St Peter's Lower Primary School, Kendriya Vidyalaya, Army School and the recently opened Premier English School.

== See also ==
- St. Angelo Fort
- Kannur Lighthouse
