= Fortress 2 =

Fortress 2 may refer to:

- Fortress 2: Re-Entry, a 2000 film by Geoff Murphy
- Fortress 2 (video game), a 1999 South Korean video game
- Fortress 2, American action film starring Bruce Willis
