= French frigate Forte =

French frigate Forte includes the following ships:

- French frigate Forte (1794), lead Forte-class frigate, captured by the Royal Navy in 1799
- French frigate Forte (1841), a Surveillante-class frigate

== See also ==
- Forte (disambiguation)
