= Fort (disambiguation) =

A fort is a fortification: a defensive military construction.

Fort, or The Fort, may also refer to:

== Types of fortifications ==
- Castle, a fortified building
- Defensive wall, a fortified wall
- Blanket fort or pillow fort, built by children
- Device Forts, in England and Wales from 1539
- Hillfort, earthworks used as a fortified refuge
- Martello tower, in the British Empire 19th century
- Promontory fort, mainly Iron Age
- Star fort, in 15th and 16th century Europe
- Tegart fort, in Palestine from 1930s
- Wagon fort, a mobile fortification

== Arts, entertainment and media ==
- FORT, the peer-reviewed journal of the Fortress Study Group
- Fort (band), an Australian band
- Forts, a 2007 album by The Boggs
- Forts (video game), a 2017 video game by EarthWork Games
- The Fort, a 2022 novel by Gordon Korman
- The Fort (novel), a 2010 novel by Bernard Cornwell

== People ==
- Fort (surname), includes a list of people with that name
- Fořt, a Czech surname
- Michael McKenry (born 1985), nicknamed "The Fort", an American baseball player

== Places ==
- Fort Avenue (disambiguation)
- Fort Road (disambiguation)
- Fort Street (disambiguation)

=== India ===
- Fort (Mumbai precinct)

=== Sri Lanka ===
- Fort (Colombo)

=== Philippines ===
- Bonifacio Global City, also known as 'The Fort'

=== United Kingdom ===
- Glasgow Fort, Scotland; a shopping centre

=== United States ===
- A name prefix used for many United States Army installations
- The Fort (Taft, California), a historic building
- The Fort (Morrison, Colorado), a historic restaurant
- The Fort (North Lewisburg, Ohio), a historic house
- The Fort, a nickname for Gillette Stadium by New England Revolution soccer fans
- The Fort (pickleball), a pickleball center and stadium in Fort Lauderdale, Florida

== Other meanings ==
- Fleet Fort, a Canadian World War II aircraft
- RPC Fort, a Ukrainian arms manufacturer
  - Fort 12, a Ukrainian semi-automatic pistol

== See also ==
- Fortes, a name
- Category:Forts for Wikipedia articles on forts
- Fort-class replenishment ship (disambiguation)
- Fort ship (disambiguation)
- Fortress (disambiguation)
- Forth (disambiguation)
- Forte (disambiguation)
- Castle (disambiguation)
