= Fort-class replenishment ship =

Fort class replenishment ship may refer to three classes of replenishment ships:

- Fort-class replenishment oiler (of the mid-1940s)
- Fort Rosalie (Fort I)-class replenishment ship, dating from the 1970s, of the British Royal Navy
- Fort Victoria (Fort II)-class replenishment ship, dating from the 1990s, of the British Royal Navy

== See also ==
- Fort ship (disambiguation)
- Fort (disambiguation)
