= Fort Street =

Fort Street may refer to:

== Streets ==
- Fort Street, Hong Kong, a street in North Point, Hong Kong Island, Hong Kong
- Fort Street (Los Angeles), California, USA; now known as Broadway
- M-85 (Michigan highway) (Fort Street), USA; a Michigan highway
- Fort Street (Omaha), a major east–west thoroughfare in Omaha, Nebraska, USA

== Facilities and structures ==
- Fort Street High School, a government secondary selective school located in Sydney, New South Wales, Australia
- Fort Street Public School, a government primary school located in Sydney, New South Wales, Australia
- Fort Street Mall, Downtown Honolulu, Hawaii, USA
- Fort Street Presbyterian Church (Detroit, Michigan), USA
- Fort Street Presbyterian Church (San Marcos, Texas), USA
- Fort Street Union Depot, West Fort Street, Detroit, Michigan, USA; a train station, a union station used by multiple railroad companies

== Other uses ==
- Fort Street (constituency), a constituency in the Eastern District, Hong Kong
- Fort Street Historic District, Boise, Idaho, USA

== See also ==
- Fortified gateway, a street fort for controlling passage on a street
- Fort Road Food Street, Walled City, Lahore, Punjab, Pakistan
- Fort Street Presbyterian Church (disambiguation)
- Fort (disambiguation)
- Street (disambiguation)
- Fort Road (disambiguation)
- Fort Avenue (disambiguation)
