= Gawalmandi Food Street =

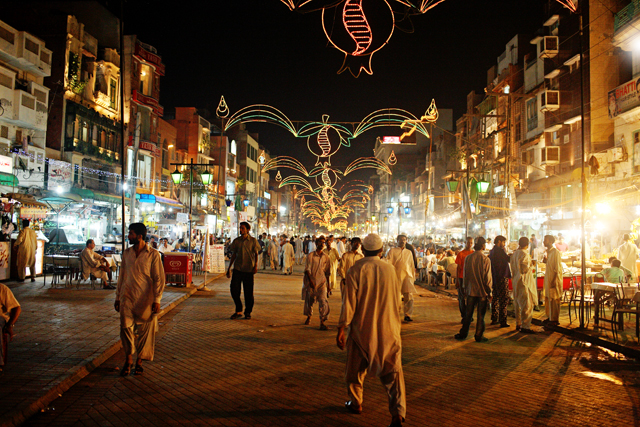
Food Street, Lahore, Punjab, Pakistan

Gawalmandi Food Street (Punjabi: سڑک خوراک گوالمنڈی, Sarak-e-Khorak Gwolmandi) is a food street located near the Gawalmandi neighbourhood of Lahore, Punjab, Pakistan. Historically, it was a area and many of the families that migrated to Lahore from Amritsar and nearby cities, after the creation of Pakistan settled in Gawalmandi. A lack of employment opportunities led many of them to open up small shops in front of their houses. The migrating families brought with them new cuisine and recipes, laying the foundation for a street well known for its great food.

== See also ==
- Lahori cuisine
- Fort Road Food Street
- List of restaurant districts and streets
