= Tank Knights Portriss =

South Korean-Japanese anime television series

- 無限戦記ポトリス
- Genre: Animation; Mechanic; Action; Adventure; Comedy
- Based on: Fortress
- Developed by: Shinzô Fujita
- Directed by: Akira Shigino (chief); Jongsik Nam (chief)
- Music by: Kayta Shiina; Yuko Fukushima
- Countries of origin: Japan; South Korea
- Original language: Japanese
- No. of episodes: 52

Production
- Producers: Shunji Aoki (TV Tokyo); Naoki Sasada; Toru Hasegawa
- Running time: 22–24 minutes
- Production companies: TV Tokyo; NAS; Sunrise

Original release
- Network: TXN (TV Tokyo)
- Release: April 5, 2003 – March 27, 2004

Tank Knights Potriss (無限戦記ポトリス, Mugen Senki Potorisu), is a South Korean-Japanese anime television series produced by Sunrise in conjunction with SBS Productions that aired on TV Tokyo and its affiliates from April 2003 to March 2004.

== Media ==
=== Animation series ===
This show was broadcast in Japanese language on TV Tokyo from April 5, 2003, to March 27, 2004. Five months after its Japanese telecast, the Korean language version, which was being shown on SBS, aired from August 6, 2003, to June 17, 2004, with 52 episodes.

=== On-line Games ===
One of the most-popular hit animation TV series was inspired by South Korea online game developed by AllStar and published by Softzen. Fortress 2 Blue (American name is BB Tanks). BB Tanks has 12 characters that were inspired by arms or tanks of the past, present, and future. Tank Knights Fortress has also hero or heroine what motivated from 12 characters of game. They are called 'Fortress Knights'. They are transform to human-like robot.

== Series overview ==
This show revolves around the three Fortress Knights and a human boy named Yuma who are about to shape the Fortress Planet, known as the home where robots live in peace. But the harmony was disrupted because of the sudden presence of a dictator named Dark Fortress along with his evil schemes. Now it's up to the Fortress Knights and Yuma, who accidentally got into the Fortress Planet, to battle the evil forces and maintain peace throughout the Fortress Planet.

=== Prologue ===
==== Fortress World ====
- The Fortress has a long history of the planet. Almost like a human with a very long life (First Fortress organisms) constitute a high civilization had been living. One day, a meteorite crashes happening with, they will be destroyed. After the fortress was transformed into a planet goes into the world of the dead. However, you can not live life even more difficult that the natural environment, organisms have survived a first Fortress to adapt to harsh natural environment continues to be a quiet evolution. Fortress is a second life so it is finally born. This difference was apparently living with the human, it constitutes a body existed in the planet is as heavy metal minerals (mechanic) was set. Thus, the fortress planet, and prosperity in the birth of a new life out of the stage is changed.

==== Fortress World, and the wounds of war ====
- The day after hundreds of years from inception of the story, the dictator of the world because of confused riding pyureoro Fortress, a series of battles in the streets and the town goes pagoedoeeoman. Such an invitation would stand up with Fortress Fortress pyureoege revolt is the article. Their superior combat skills and a noble spirit Fortress pyureoreul down as a dictator, by a long war, conclude peace, nestled in the Fortress World is this.

==== Fortress of the article rally ====
- The Fortress World and lasts a long peace. This would appear suddenly in a world of peace, the Dark Fortress another dictator. Fortress World, to try to protect us from the clutches of evil 'Fortress article' to the gathering, and they invited an armed variant of the Fortress story take over capability and a strong fortress Rise (Changeling), possesses the ability, and humanoid robots from the tank during the battle It is also possible to change the mode. Moreover, convergence with the strain that can exert more power. The purpose of the Super Dimension Fortress Dark dictator Four complete destruction of the giant computer and fused them to dream them. Thus as God is opening an eternity. Dark Fortress Fortress articles defeated army rises to restore peace.

==== Inception of the story ====
- Dark Fortress Fortress army engineer's home base of the tower of Babel, Carrot, Duke, Digg is all that is undercover. Dark Fortress is our only chance and convinced tadohal and the Order of the fortress, but all were in the palm of a dark fortress. The interior of the tower was completely empty, the fact that this place was the launch of Super Dimension Four will be destroyed. Fortress of articles can be removed I think the great opportunity to destroy the Dark Super Dimension Fortress Four touching moment of the switch suddenly from heaven come down off the capsule containing the boy. Rise of the Fortress over Carrot yunghapha ability to exert a special boy. Dark Fortress gave a phenomenal show the power failure Super Dimension Fortress Four knights and the boy away from the area of the attack and sent away. Fortress of the Knights and the boys back to your party Passing through rugged battle zone is advanced toward the Tower of Babel.

==== Plot ====
- The Strain Dark Fortress Fortress reported that the fusion process, being pulled understand the mechanism of Lies. Thus, the black dragon named Dark Fortress Fortress Rise produces a life as possible.
- Knights came his way to the Dark City, would be attacked by a black dragon. The power of the mighty black dragon struggled during the Yuma novelties to the black dragon hadaga checks are being attacked by surprise. Strain the fruit from doctors around Yuma for me to hear the word energy and water, Carrot, driving alone, the strain that the strain that Yuma to obtain the fruit supply. Carrot and the strain that recovered energy to the fusion of the black dragon sseureotteurinda.
- After the name of the strain that comes from the fruit of 'Yuma' is to get the name. Yuma Knights of the fortress since the need to accompany with each Carrot and fused to contribute to the victory of the Knights Fortress.
- Fortress of the Knights captured the 25 I used to train the attack will be met during the Canon. Since then, Unicorn will meet in the woods. Unicorn Fortress combined forces with the Knights to victory in the battle in the woods, you reap. Unicorn after every flush of the other knights of the crisis does not spare his own life are helpful.

==== Fortress Infinite Union ====
- The committee, after escorting kaeteoreul jyadiseureul learns. Tate Fortress jyadiseuneun members are too young to save the world in the fight despite the feeling of fear, but Knights Fortress and help to restore confidence in Fortress World are fighting for freedom and peace.
- Beach towns are being bombarded by the news, Templars Fortress bombers and aircraft carriers in the cycle and undercover operations to try to attack and in the process, and encounter new articles section & Tritton will join. Bombing of the USS Triton assistance to be successful and will regain stability in the village.
- Since the Knights once again leave the fortress, but, during the dark of the new group will be staging a surprise attack missiles. The information group to smuggle missiles, missile factories to get into the dark, but there is working with researchers from the bulkan - teurakan brother was discovered to be standing at the crossroads of survival. However, his brother's knowledge of the fortress as a base article, get my life is.
- After Dark Templars were to find the underground station and the karma there be any way to rescue the citizens of defeat underground bases being built in large sublessee 'mega-tank, The Dark' is relative. Dark mega-tanks in the north to conquer the continent Gracia Dark Fortress is directly manipulating the tank. Knights of the operation, despite the dark to get to Garcia, but the mega tank, Fortress of the Knights of relentless attacks and destroys as diminishing tolerance for cold, dark fortress failed, and ends with the conquest of Garcia.
- Since a large amount of volcanic energy, and 22 groups Dark energy is collected intelligence to identify the Fortress a volcanic island to the Knights of the destruction of the energy will infiltrate. In the process, the energy is seen to Yuma, and reacting. Struck in the dark were cornered in the Fortress of the Knights bulkan - teurakan brother is back with the help of. Bulkan a new weapon and a bag Khan Yuma 'Yuma Revolver' and provide a bullet. Again after breaking into a volcanic island fortress of the Knights, Yuma, and reacting to the energy of the unknown could be due to super-Rise, and stands up more powerful groups in the form of Dark.
- This inspired the Dark Knights Fortress City of the journey in a hurry. Digg it neared the Dark City, Freud met his old friend to create a new, dark fortress invincible part of life is to obtain information about transportation. Fortress of the Knights, however, failed to destroy part of the train, the Dark Fortress with a part of life invincible 'jeokmaryong' is completed.
- Dakeusiti jingyeokhan the Fortress of the Knights fell in front of the left dakeusiti, Dark Yuma to Fort Lee, kidnapping killed. The Super Dimension running guns to complete destruction of vital energy needs because of Yuma. Dark Fortress in a Yuma succeeded in collecting a vital energy, the Yuma Yuma to escape with a revolver. Yuma Super Dimension to the destruction of their vital energy by heating the bubble toward our operations are interrupted by destruction of the Four. The Super Dimension Four, but the destruction was launched within 2 strain is summoning me. Article 2 of the Forest Ranger, Dark Fortress, Dark City, with dragon and jeokma to escape.
- The final match of the day after the former commander of the Dark's karma, yiohna, jinggoneun prisoners arrested, but escaped the camp Soon after the chatahnaseonda Dark Fortress. After the capture of the full City Council Dark Fortress Dark City, the name of the 'Peace City' after getting the redevelopment to proceed.
- Dark Fortress after fortress jyadiseurobuteo to find the best elder members go to Alta Roy called me to advise the Fortress of the Knights, will meet him. The Super Dimension prisoners this time due to destruction of the black dragon and the encounter is broken. Carrot to fight in the same conditions, anticipate accepting of the black dragon, black dragon chaos smoother fair fight and win the Carrot getdaneun disappear without a dream. After leaving the Knights of the black dragon, the past history of the planet Alta Fortress hear from me and the Dark Fortress, Roy learns of the plan. This past destroyed human civilization 'ultimate destruction of space weapons and reassemble the whole world to conquer a fortress in the process of the Forest Rangers 2 (Iowa) was to use the power of.
- Thus, the destruction of the weapons of knights fortress to stop the assembly lines in a much stronger convergence dahana Iowa jeokma dragon attacks and part of the Dark Fortress to gain favor from the back of obtaining all the dark military commanders have failed to interfere with parts are assembled to go destruction weapons (amheukdaemaryong) are finished. In this process, the former army commander Dark Carrot kidnapped in Ghana and to find the Dark Fortress is fit again rejected. Carrot and fell to the basement with all the Dark Knights Fortress soon other military commanders were rescued by military commanders before the Dark Knights Fortress and the separation will be.
- Dark Fortress Knights of hemp as a dragon with an enormous power to subdue. Thus, for the murder of a child coming to Yuma to the success of the Dark Fortress as a force trying to kill a black dragon to Carrot Top showed up again to rescue Knights Fortress. Fortress of the Knights of Yuma to sacrifice the time a child comes the sad strain that killed the only reason to be getting away from the Dark Fortress. They fused with the dark dragon marijuana to Iowa because of the vital energy needs of the Dark Fortress dwijjotneunda him. Children were rescued by following the Dark Knights Fortress Dark Fortress and Fortress World hemp destroyed by the dragon saw that do not step on the way of the previous era of thinking of giving their vital energy to live again makes use of Yuma. Dark Fortress, but the child is coming alive within the rest of Iowa using the vital energy itself and is fused with the dark dragon cannabis.
- Stronger than ever kiss in the dark dragon marijuana Fortress Knights will be back to the Peace City. Fortress of the Knights of the place the last day for many, the dark dragon ladies meant getting hemp is. Dark Fortress Knights at this point I joined the army commander and the Knights Fortress This is the power to restore. (The set of all 12 people) after the forces of darkness, Carrot Hemp as the vital energy of Yuma in the fusion dragon is to fight the Dark Fortress and directly agree about the rest of the Dark Knights Fortress hemp dragon killed by destroying the Dark Fortress to be successful. This Fortress World is a long war ended with the peace is coming back.

== Characters ==
=== Dragon Blue/Karot ===
Japanese: ドラゴンブルー
Korean: 캐롯

Voiced by: Katsuhiko KAWAMOTO (Japanese)/Seungjoon Kim (Korean)

"Calotte of Blue Dragon". Doragon Blue. The tank where it is honest the justice impression is strong. It is the leader of Fortress Knights . Besides the fact that individual the blue dragon is imitated it has shooting skill necessary, with the barrel and vin rose carry it draws out, cooperation attack "of the sword of triune light" and the "super unlimited union Omega violent bullet" etc. is used. As for the character which becomes the "Calotte Tank".

=== Tiger Barrel/Duke ===
Japanese: タイガーバレル
Korean: 듀크

Voiced by: Shunsuke SAKUNO (Japanese)/Seonghun Hong (Korean)

"Duke of White Tiger". White Tiger. At lustful house owner of light character. Also it has been deceived in confession of the fake of Karma. As for the character which becomes "Duke Tank".

=== Duel Rose/Dig ===
Japanese: デュエル・ロゼ
Korean: 디그

Voiced by: Chafurin (Japanese)/Wonjoon Lee (Korean)

"Missile Phoenix". Dig. Substance part of missile tank. With the younger brother of the vin rose, you speak in the tone this like the woman. As for the character which becomes the cause "the missile".

=== Duel Carry/Dag ===
Japanese: デュエル・キャリー
Korean: 다그

Voiced by: Hiroshi KAMIYA (Japanese)/Moonja Choe (Korean)

"Missile Phoenix". Dag. Missile part of missile tank. With the older brother of carry, you speak in the tone like the woman. As for the character which becomes the cause of "the missile".

=== Cannon Gum/Cannon ===
Japanese: キャノンガム
Korean: 캐논

Voiced by:Kenta MIYAKE (Japanese)/Inseong Oh (Korean)

"Minotauros". As for character being bold, it is in the accident at the time of infancy. As for the character which becomes the cause of "CANON".

=== Cross Dager/Unicorn ===
Japanese: クロスダーガ Korean: 유니콘

Voiced by: Takuma TAKEWAKA (Japanese)/Seunguk Jeong (Korean)

"The soldier of the forest". (Only 6th story "The cross bow of the unicorn"). Unicorn. As for the character which becomes the cause the "cross bow".

=== Catapult Patta/Cata ===
Japanese: カタパルトカタ Korean: 캐터

Voiced by: Fumihiko TACHIKI (Japanese)/Inseong Oh (Korean)

"Catapult of Fortress Military Affairs". Veteran of throwing a stone machine type. As for the character which becomes the cause "the catapult".

=== Posse Vayoot/Triton ===
Japanese: ポセバイユート Korean: 트리톤

Voiced by: Masato AMADA (Japanese)/Seunguk Jeong (Korean)

"Man of sea". As for the character which becomes the cause "Poseydon".

=== Mine Sporken/Vulkhan ===
Japanese: マインスポーケン Korean: 불칸

Voiced by: Inseong Oh (Korean) / Yutaka AOYAMA (Japanese)

"Wing of intelligence and courage". Chimera. Older brother of Trakhan. As for the character which becomes the cause minelander.

=== Multi Cocopa/Trakhan ===
Japanese: マルチココパ Korean: 트라칸

Voiced by: Daisuke KISHIO (Japanese)/Seunguk Jeong (Korean)

"Watch dog of science". Kerberos. Younger brother of Bulkhan. As for the character which becomes the cause "the multi missile".

=== Yuma ===
Japanese: ユウマ
Korean: 유마

Voiced by: Ryoko Shiroishi (Japanese) / Seonju Yi (Korean)

Construction of a human boy popped through the warped space. Tate lost all memory of the past is unknown. Fortress as articles and fusion, the mechanism and unity, will become a special ability. Tianjin nanman, curious nature, hostile to the Dark Fortress bultaewoomyeonseodo other hand, enjoys traveling with Fortress article seems to be shaved. Ability to fuse with that machine, Yuma was a mutant, because the man in the world is dominated by the giant computer in his country's afraid of him, while all of his memories erased them tossed out of space. Yuma eat the fruit.

=== Other characters ===
- Dark Fortress (ダーク・ポトリス; Korean: 다크 포트리스)
- Karma (Korean: 카르마)
- Iona (Korean: 이오나)
- Jingo (Korean: 징고)
- Black Devil Tank Black Dragon/Black Dragon (ブラックデビルタンク・黒魔龍/흑마룡)
- IO (アイオー/아이오)

== Production ==
About 7 billion won was invested in the series.
