= Fort Avenue =

Fort Avenue may refer to:

- Fort Avenue (Baltimore), Maryland, United States
  - Fort Avenue Line, CityLink Navy, BaltimoreLink; an electrified overhead line for electric trolleybus service on Fort Avenue, Baltimore, Maryland, United States
- Fort Avenue, Salem, Massachusetts, United States
- U.S. Route 460 Business (Lynchburg, Virginia), United States; known as "Fort Avenue"

== See also ==
- Fortified gateway, a fort on an avenue for controlling passage on the avenue
- Avenue (disambiguation)
- Fort (disambiguation)
- Fort Road (disambiguation)
- Fort Street (disambiguation)
