= Lahori cuisine =

Culinary traditions of Lahore, Pakistan

Lahori cuisine (Punjabi: لہوری کھانا, Urdu: لاہوری پکوان) refers to the food and cuisine of the city of Lahore in Punjab, Pakistan. It is a part of regional Punjabi cuisine. Lahore is a city with an extremely rich food culture. People from Lahore are famous all over the country for their love for food. The city offers a vast variety of options when it comes to gastronomy. In recent times, the style of food has achieved popularity in a number of different countries, because of its palatable and milder taste, mainly through the Pakistani diaspora.

== Historical influences ==
The arrival of Islam within South Asia influenced the local cuisine to a great degree as Muslims are forbidden to eat pork or consume alcohol along with the other enforced Islamic dietary laws. Pakistanis focus on other areas of food such as beef, lamb, chicken, fish, lentils and vegetables as well as traditional fruit and dairy. The influence of Central Asian, North Indian and Middle Eastern cuisine in Pakistani food is ubiquitous. Much of the food of Lahore is influenced by the local Punjabi and Mughlai cuisine. Along with traditional local food, Chinese, western and foreign foods are popular throughout the city and have often been fused with local recipes to create refined tastes; Pakistani Chinese food is largely available.

== Popular dishes ==
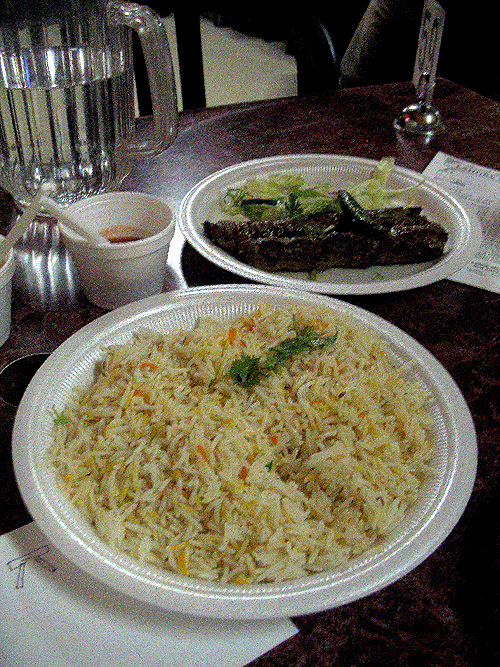
Plain rice and Lahori lamb kebab.

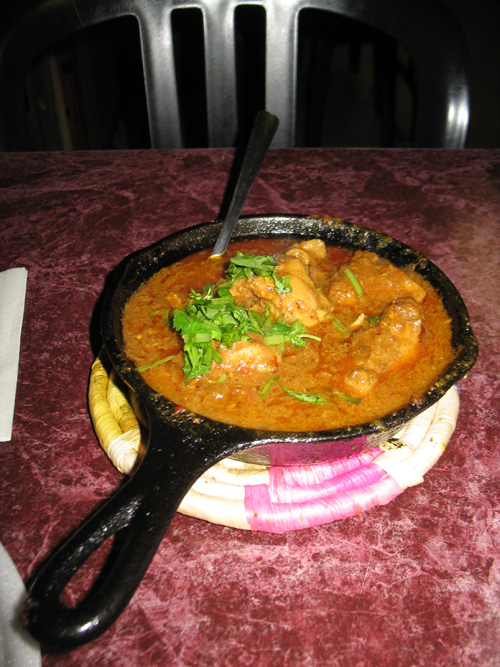
Lahori-style karahi

The following is a list of some foods popular in Lahore.

- Chicken Lahori
- Gosht karahi (chicken or mutton cooked with a spicy tomato-based gravy in a concave-shaped cooking vessel that resembles a wok) is a speciality of Lahore.
- Dal gosht (meat cooked with pulses)
- Murgh Cholay/Channay (chicken cooked with chickpeas)
- Murgh Musallam (chicken cooked with rice and dry fruits stuffed inside)
- Seekh kababs (minced meat rolls)
- Gol-gappe / pani-puri
- Dahi bhallay (appetizers dipped in yoghurt)
- Shawarma/Dhawarma Platter
- Chicken tikka (barbecue-style fried chicken pieces)
- Biryani
- Haleem
- Falooda
- Halwa Poori - a breakfast speciality of Lahore
- Nihari
- Samosa
- Kheer
- Paya (dish)
- Lahori Fried Fish
- Chargha (Lahori-style roast chicken)
- Daal Chawal - Boiled rice with spicy lentils
- Lahori Steamed Charga
- Lahori Chana Chat
- Lahori Daal Murgh
- Lahori Red Chicken Karahi
- Hareesa - A mixture of Mutton & Lentils
- Fried fish
- Beef Bong Paaye - Beef Shank meat with foots
- Chikkarh Chollay - Water Cooked white grains in black pepper
- Naan Haleem - Baked Chapatti bread with mixture of Beef & Lentils
- Chicken pakora - chicken pieces roasted with Maida
- Chicken Sajji - Roasted & Salted Chicken on low flame in hunter style

== Food streets ==
- Fort Road Food Street
- Gawalmandi Food Street

== See also ==
- Pakistani cuisine
- Punjabi cuisine
- Mughlai cuisine
