= Lady Willingdon Hospital =

Coordinates: 31°35′N 74°18′E

Geography
- Location: Lahore, Punjab, Pakistan

Organisation
- Care system: Tertiary care
- Type: Teaching Hospital (Government)
- Affiliated university: King Edward Medical University (KEMU)

History
- Founded: 1933

Links
- Website: https://kemu.edu.pk/
- Other links: List of hospitals in Lahore

Lady Willingdon Hospital is a public hospital located in Lahore, Punjab, Pakistan. It is a teaching hospital of King Edward Medical University and one of the largest maternity hospitals in Pakistan. Its history dates back to 1930 when Teka Devi Health Centre was opened as an outpatient clinic for women on the Fort Road, Lahore.

It has been a teaching institution since 1933, attracting undergraduate, postgraduate, and post-fellowship doctors. It is fully recognised for training by the Higher Education Commission, PMDC, CPSP, and the RCOG (UK).

== History ==
In 1933, Lt. Col. S. N. Hayes laid the foundation stone of Lady Willingdon Hospital, naming it after the wife of the 22nd Viceroy of India. He became the hospital's first Medical Superintendent and was also one of the former Principals of King Edward Medical College. The hospital was affiliated with King Edward Medical College, Lahore, that same year.

== Relocation ==
In 2011, the Punjab government faced resistance from local residents, after introducing a plan for the relocation of Lady Willingdon Hospital and the de'Montmorency College of Dentistry. Allegedly, the drive was initiated to clear the view of the Badshashi Mosque and the Minar-e-Pakistan. According to locals, it would be unwise to relocate the hospital, given that the institution caters to thousands of people living in this densely populated area. Despite opposition from locals and the doctors' community, in 2014, a chunk of 22,257 m^{2} (239,570 sq ft) of land was identified behind Lorry Adda (Badamai Bagh) for constructing a new building for Lady Willingdon Hospital.
