= Fort Road, Kannur =

Fort Road
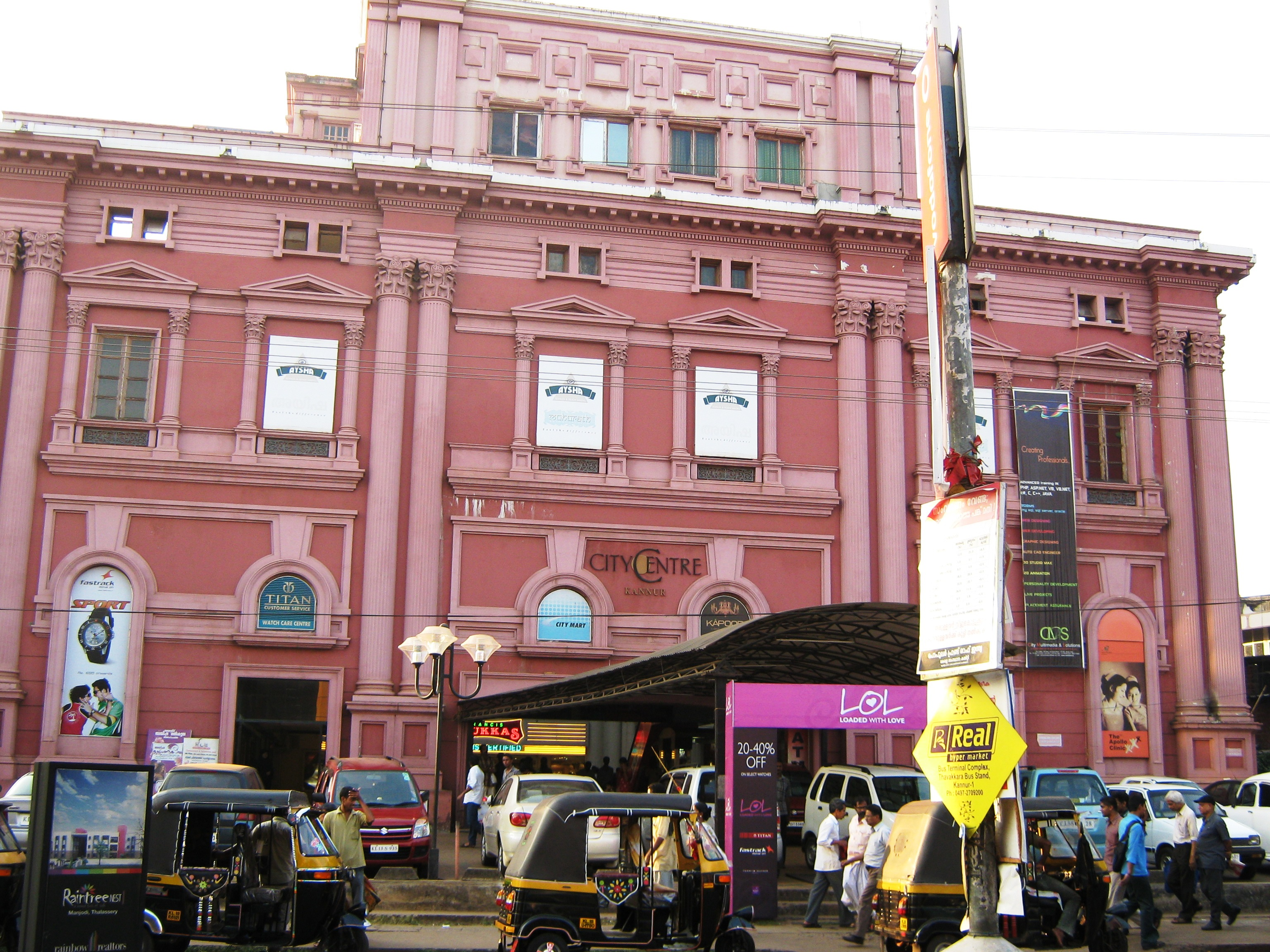
- Kannur City Centre on Fort Road
- Interactive map of Fort Road
- Coordinates: 11°52′11″N 75°22′09″E
- Country: India
- State: Kerala
- District: Kannur

Government
  - Body: Kannur Municipal Corporation

Languages
  - Official: Malayalam, English
- Time zone: UTC+5:30 (IST)
- ISO 3166 code: IN-KL
- Vehicle registration: KL-13

Fort Road is a busy shopping area in Kannur city of Kerala, India. The road is so named, because it leads to the St. Angelo Fort.

Fort Road is the business hub of Kannur city, with many businesses and banks having their Kannur branches and outlets on the street. Some of the prominent shopping outlets are Supplyco, Fortlight Complex, Super Bazar. The Kannur railway station is located at the northern end of the road, and several tourist homes and hotels are concentrated in the area.

The State Bank of India has a large campus on Fort Road. The Kannur City Centre—Kannur's largest shopping mall—is also located there. Kannur City Centre houses many of the larger outlets like Alukkas, Baskin-Robbins, Asiatic Internet Cafe, Apollo Clinic, Majestic, and Green's Hypermarket.

== See also ==
- Kannur
- Kannur District
