= Fort Street Presbyterian Church =

Fort Street Presbyterian Church may refer to:

- Fort Street Presbyterian Church (Detroit, Michigan), listed on the National Register of Historic Places in Wayne County, Michigan
- Fort Street Presbyterian Church (San Marcos, Texas), listed on the National Register of Historic Places in Hays County, Texas

== See also ==
- Fort Street (disambiguation)
