= Kannur Lighthouse =

Lighthouse in Kerala, India

Cannanore lighthouse
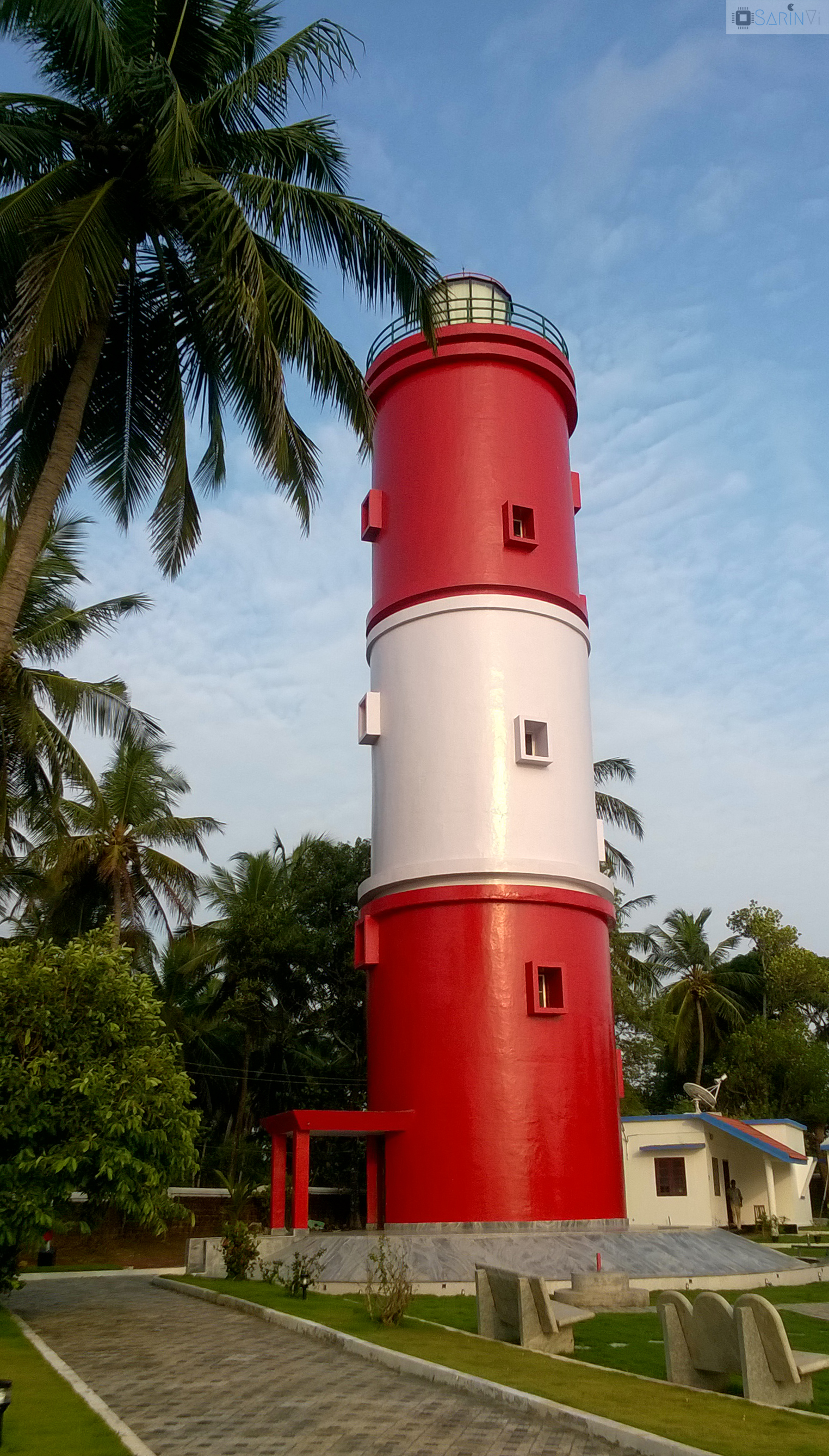
- The new lighthouse commissioned into service on 25 July 1976
- Location: Northwest of Kannur; Kerala, India
- Coordinates: 11°51′37.9″N 75°21′21.3″E

Tower
- Constructed: 1903 (first)
- Construction: concrete tower
- Height: 23 metres (75 ft)
- Shape: cylindrical tower with balcony and small lantern
- Markings: red tower with a single white band, white lantern

Light
- First lit: 1976 (current)
- Focal height: 35 metres (115 ft)
- Lens: Type C sealed beam lamp (original), Type D sealed beam lamp (current)
- Range: 18.8 nautical miles (34.8 km; 21.6 mi)
- Characteristic: Fl W 10s.

The Kannur Lighthouse is located near the Payyambalam Beach, a few kilometers from Kannur town, in Kerala state, south India. It is adjacent to the Sea View Park and the Government Guest House. The lighthouse is still active and overlooks the Arabian Sea.

Cannanore is the old English name for the town named Kannur. The lighthouse at Kannur is still often referred to as the Cannanore lighthouse.

== History ==
Cannanore (now Kannur) was an important seaport under the 15th century rulers of North Malabar, the Kolathiris and the Arakkal Kingdom. The port had maritime links with the ports of Madras, Colombo, Tuticorin, Alleppey, Mangalore, Bombay and Karachi.

The Portuguese led by Vasco Da Gama first landed at Kappad beach in 1498. They built the St. Angelo Fort at Kannur in the early 16th century. Almost two centuries later, the region came under the control of the British, who established a cantonment at Cannanore in the 19th century.

In 1902, the Presidency Port Officer of Madras state government sanctioned an amount of Rs. 3430/- for the construction of a lighthouse tower atop the fort. This stone tower was commissioned in the year 1903, but at a later date the tower, along with a part of the fort, was taken away by the sea. After this only, a mast was installed inside the fort to hoist a lighthouse lantern.

In order to warn ships at sea of land, a system of hoisting a lantern with an oil wick lamp was introduced in 1843 by the British. A masonry pedestal was constructed in 1903 on the rampart of the fort and a double wick oil lamp inside the 4th order dioptric lens and lantern with arrangement for occultation was placed on this pedestal. The light was made available during fair seasons only, from September to May every year.

In 1924, some enhancements were made. The light was shifted in 1939 on to a 16-metre steel trestle erected on the northern bastion of the fort. The steel trestle can still be seen today at the fort.

The equipment was replaced by a flashing light with 10-second character running on DA gas in 1948. This light remained in operation till the new lighthouse tower was constructed at the present location during 1975–76.

== Today ==
Today, the light uses modern PRB-42 equipment with 6 volt, 30 watt Type 'C' sealed beam lamps, supplied by Messers J. Stone India, of Calcutta. The GI lantern house installed at the station is 2.4 meters in diameter and was fabricated at Cochin. The new lighthouse was commissioned into service on 25 July 1976.

On 31 May 2003, the 'C' type sealed beam lamps were replaced by 'D' type sealed beam lamps. Today the lighthouse lights up the skies every night, and offers a solitary light that can be seen from the Baby beach and as far as Payyambalam.

== Image gallery ==
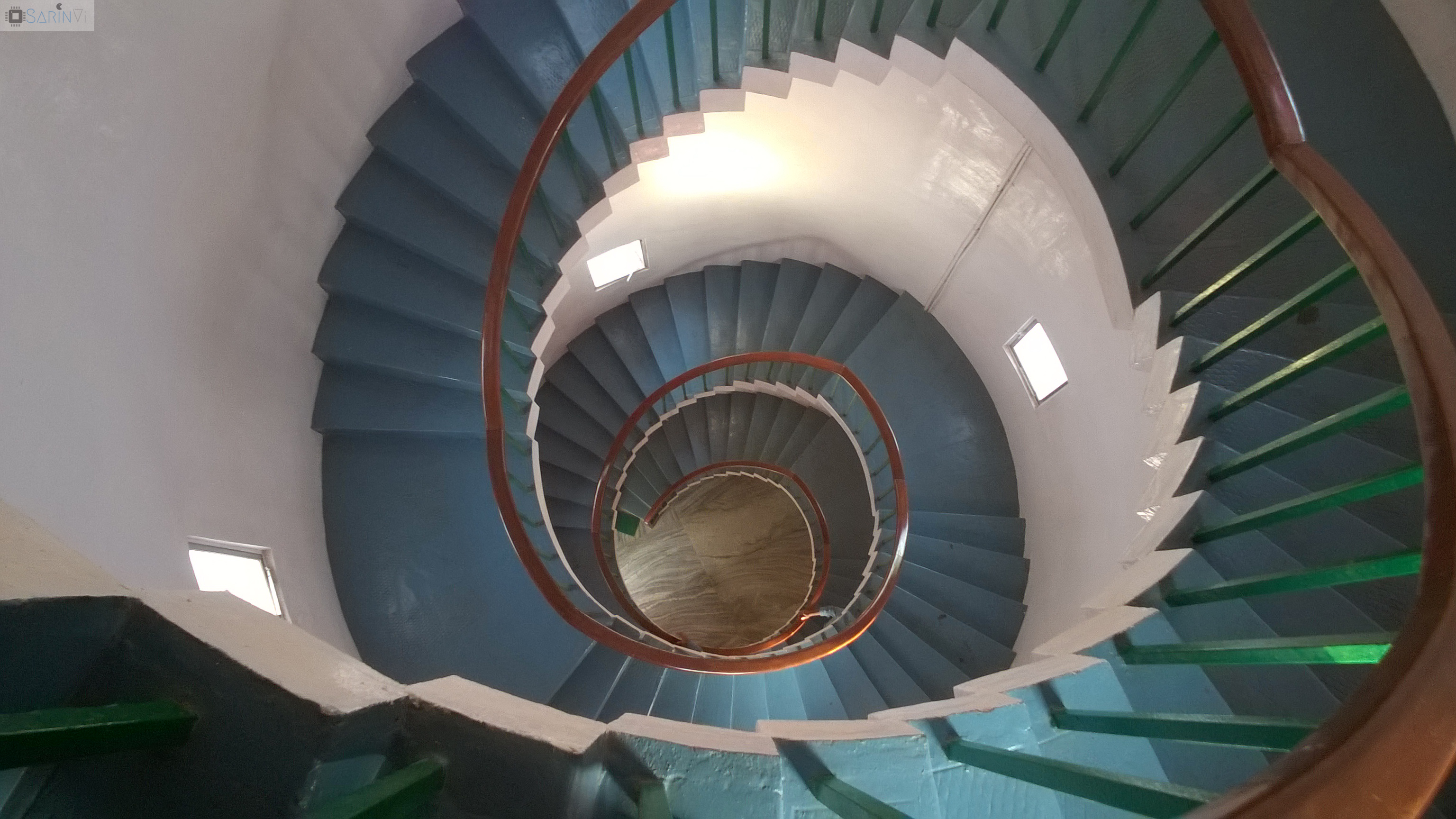
View from Inside

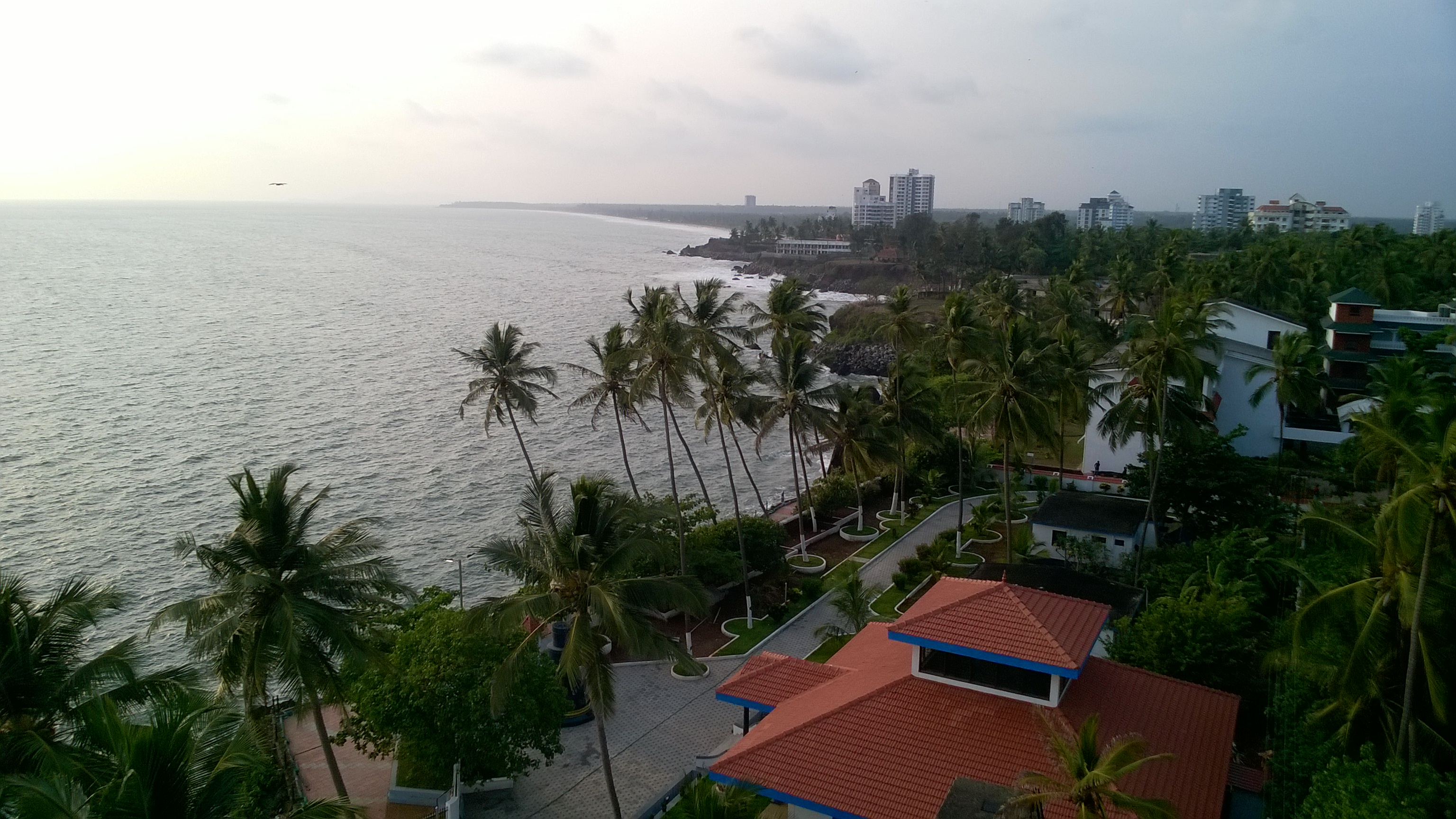
View from the Top

== See also ==
- Alappuzha Lighthouse
- Cannanore Cantonment
- List of lighthouses in India
