= Forte =

Forte or Forté may refer to:

== Music ==
- Forte (music), a musical dynamic meaning "loudly" or "strong"
- Forte number, an ordering given to every pitch class set
- Forte (notation program), a suite of musical score notation programs
- Forte (vocal group), a classical crossover singing trio

== Computing ==
- Forté 4GL, a proprietary application server
- Forté Agent, an email and news client used on the Windows operating system
- Forte TeamWare, a family of development environments from Sun Microsystems
- NetBeans IDE, formerly Forté for Java

== Companies ==
- Forte Design Systems, an American software company
- Forte Group, a former British hotel company
- Forté Internet Software, makers of Forté Agent
- Forte Land, a Chinese large-scale real estate company
- Forte Oil PLC, former name of Ardova Plc, a Nigerian energy group
- Trust House Forte, a British hotel and catering firm

== Fictional characters ==
- Forte Stollen, a character from the Galaxy Angel anime
- Bass (Mega Man), a character in Mega Man known as "Forte" in Japanese
- Bass.EXE, a character from the MegaMan NT Warrior series known as "Forte" in Japanese
- Forte, a character in Beauty and the Beast: The Enchanted Christmas

== Ships ==
- HMS Forte, various Royal Navy ships
- Forte-class frigate, two French Navy warships
  - French frigate Forte (1794), in service 1794–1801
- Boskalis Forte, a Dutch semi-submersible heavy-lift ship

== Other uses ==
- Forte (surname)
- 8780 Forte, an asteroid
- FORTE, Fast On-orbit Rapid Recording of Transient Events satellite
- Forte (fencing), a fencing term for the "strong" part of the blade
- Forte (typeface), included in various editions of Microsoft Office
- Forte (horse), an American thoroughbred race horse
- Kia Forte, a mid-size sedan car
- Mitsubishi Forte, original name of the Mitsubishi Triton, a mid-size pickup truck
- FC Forte Taganrog, a Russiang football club based in Taganrog, Rostov Oblast

== See also ==
- Fort (disambiguation)
- Fortes, a surname
