= Chargha =

Pakistani chicken dish

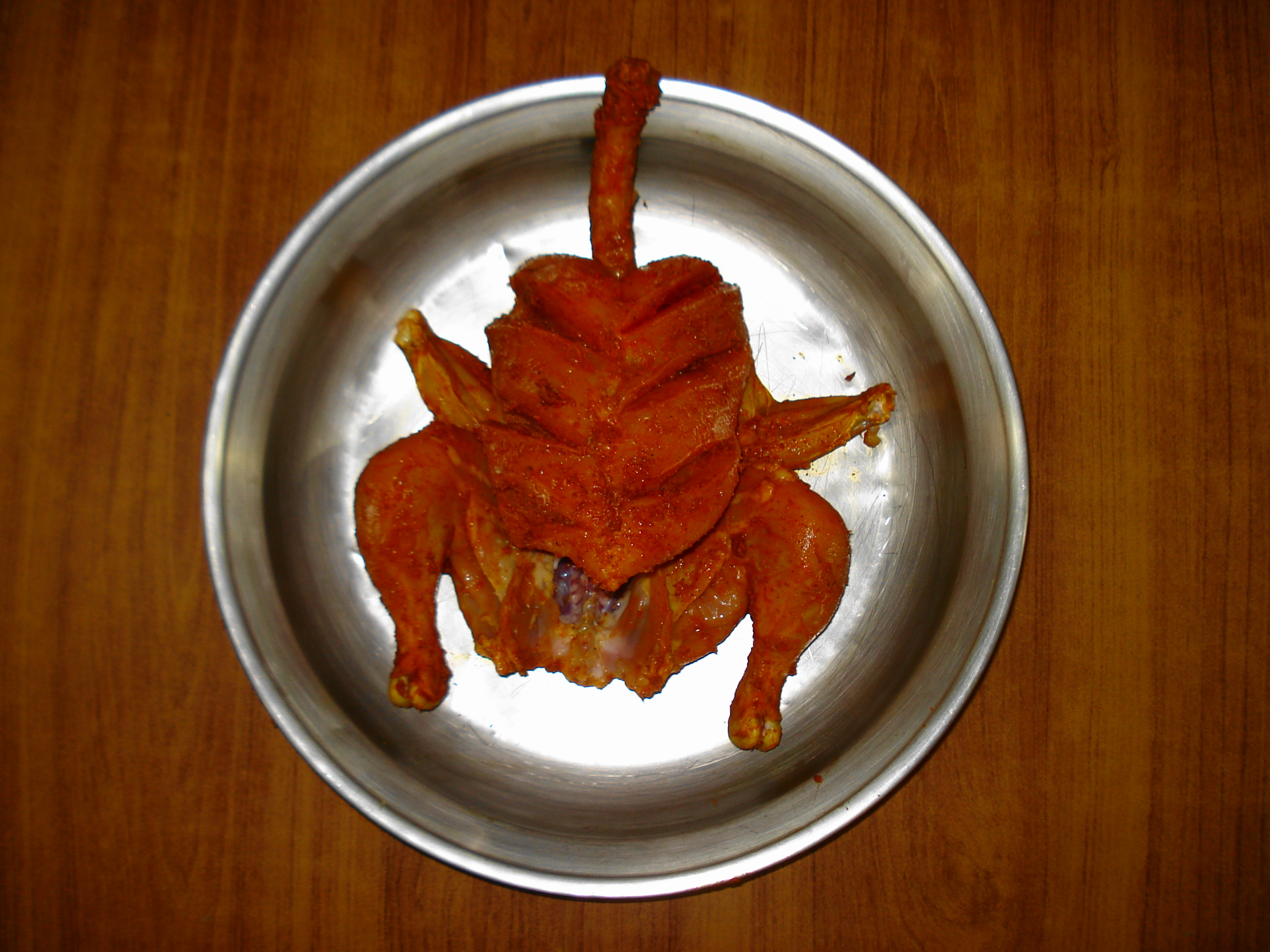
- A Lahori chargha, consisting of whole chicken during marination
- Course: Starter or Main Course
- Region or state: Lahore, Pakistan
- Serving temperature: Hot
- Main ingredients: Chicken, Yogurt, Mixed-Spices

Chargha (Urdu: چرغا) is a deep fried chicken dish from Lahore, Pakistan. The term chargha is a term of the Pashto language meaning "chicken". The dish is widely popular throughout Pakistan.

The whole chicken is marinated overnight in the refrigerator with sauce made of spices mixed with yoghurt, with horizontal cuts through the chicken in order to infuse the flavors. The marinated chicken is first steamed until tender and then fried in oil to give a crisp texture.

== See also ==
- List of chicken dishes
- Lahori cuisine
- Pakistani cuisine
- Pakistani meat dishes
