= Fortress Pass =

Mountain pass in Nunavut, Canada

- Location within Nunavut
- Elevation: 1,345 metres (4,413 ft)

Third Approach
- Location: Nunavut, Canada
- Coordinates: 70°28′03″N 70°49′50″W
- Topo map: NTS 27F6 (untitled)

Fortress Pass is a mountain pass in the central Baffin Mountains, Nunavut, Canada. It is named after Fortress Mountain.
