= Fortes =

Fortes is a family name in mostly Portuguese-speaking countries.

Famous people named Fortes include:

- Agostinho Fortes Filho (1901–1966), known as Fortes, Brazilian international footballer.
- Alberto Fortes (born 1958), Spanish-German author and chef.
- Alvin Fortes (born 1994), Dutch footballer.
- Amâncio José Pinto Fortes (born 1990), Angolan football midfielder .
- Carlos Fortes (footballer, born 1974), Dutch footballer.
- Carlos Manuel Santos Fortes (born 1994), Portuguese footballer.
- Corsino Fortes (born 1933), Cape Verdean poet.
- Eddy Fortes (born 1950), Rotterdam-based Cape-Verdean rapper.
- Emanuel Fortes (born 1970), Brazilian former international freestyle swimmer.
- Enrique Fortes (born 1947), Cuban volleyball player.
- Fábio Fortes (born 1992), Portuguese footballer.
- Felisberto Fortes (1927–2013), Portuguese rower.
- Filipe Fortes, Brazilian Businessman and Investor.
- Hermínia da Cruz Fortes (1941—2010), Cape Verdean singer.
- Jeffrey Fortes (born 1989), Dutch-Cape Verdean footballer.
- Jesús Fortes Socas (born 1997), Spanish footballer .
- Joe Fortes (1863–1922), Canadian lifeguard.
- José Fortes Rodríguez (born 1972), Spanish professional footballer.
- Nicholas Fortes (1989) Musician.
- Nick Fortes (born 1996), American baseball player
- Marco Fortes (born 1982), Portuguese shot putter.
- Meyer Fortes (1906–1983), South African-born anthropologist.
- Odaïr Fortes (born 1987), Cape Verdean footballer.
- Paco Fortes (born 1955), Spanish footballer and manager.
- Paula Fortes (1945–2011), Cape Verdean independence activist.
- Roberto Fortes (born 1984), Angolan basketball player.
- Steven Fortès (born 1992), French professional footballer.
- Susana Fortes (born 1959), Spanish writer and columnist.
- Wowo Fortes (born 1965), Filipino lawyer and politician

== See also ==
- Fort
- Forte (disambiguation)
