= Fort ship (disambiguation) =

The Fort ships were a class of cargo ships built in Canada during World War II.

Fort ship may also refer to:

- Breastwork monitor
- Coastal battleship
- Floating battery
- Forecastle and aftcastle
- Fort Rosalie-class replenishment ship
- Fort Victoria-class replenishment oiler

== See also ==
- Fortress Ship (story), a 1963 short story by Fred Saberhagen from the Berserker (novel series)
- Fort (disambiguation)
