= Fort Road, Lahore =

Street in Lahore, Pakistan

Fort Road
- Interactive map of Fort Road
- Maintained by: City District Government Lahore
- Length: 1.4 km (0.87 mi)
- Location: Old Walled City, Lahore, Pakistan
- Coordinates: 31.5866°N 74.3123°E
- West end: Data Darbar Road
- East end: Circular Road

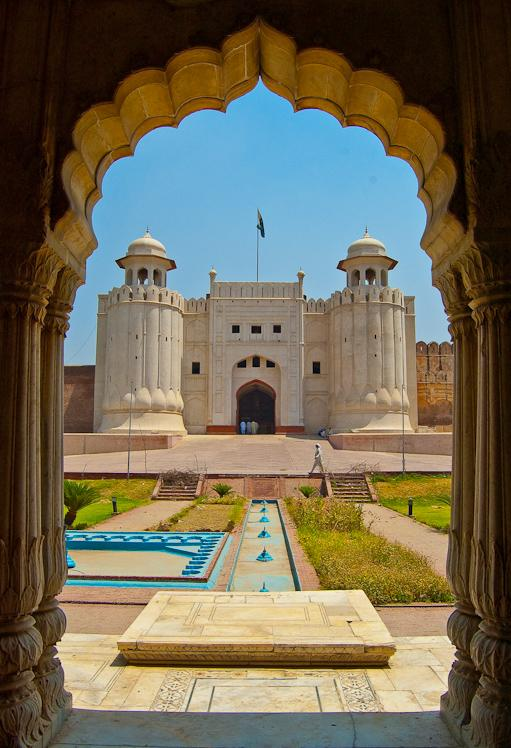
Lahore Fort.

Fort Road, Lahore is a road in the Old Walled City of Lahore, Pakistan. It is one of Lahore's most famous and historically significant roads. It is so named because it flanks the Lahore Fort on its southern and eastern sides.

Fort Road is a popular tourist destination in Lahore with some of Lahore's most important historical buildings, restaurants and antique shops situated on it. Famous landmarks on Fort Road include the world's fifth largest mosque, the Badshahi Mosque (for 313 years, the largest), the Lahore Fort, Coco's Den, Andaaz Restaurant and Pirzada Mansion (built 1930). Fort Road Food Street is also located on this road.

The De Montmorency College of Dentistry and Lady Willingdon Hospital (affiliated with King Edward Medical University) are also situated on Fort Road.
