= HMS Forte =

HMS Forte may refer to more than one ship of the British Royal Navy:

- HMS Forte (1794), a French Navy 42-gun frigate launched in 1794, captured by the Royal Navy in 1799, and wrecked in 1801.
- HMS Forte, a 5th rate ordered in 1801 but subsequently canceled.
- HMS Pembroke (1812), a 74-gun 3rd rate renamed HMS Forte when she became a receiving hulk in 1890.
- HMS Forte (1814), a 38-gun 5th rate launched in 1814 and broken up in 1844.
- HMS Forte (1858), a 51-gun screw frigate launched in 1858, hulked in the 1870s, and destroyed by fire in 1905.
- HMS Forte (1893), a protected cruiser launched in 1893 and decommissioned in 1913.
- HMS Furious (1896), a protected cruiser renamed HMS Forte after being hulked in 1915.
