= Fortress (2001 online video game) =

- Developer(s): CCR Inc
- Publisher(s): Netsgo
- Release: KOR: October 5, 2001
- Mode(s): Single-player, multiplayer

Fortress is a shooter video game developed by CCR Inc and published by Netsgo. The game spawned an animated series, Tank Knights Fortress, and a sequel, Fortress 2. On November 18, 2011, service for the game was terminated in South Korea and Japan.
