= Fort Road Food Street =

Fort Road Food Street سڑک خوراک - روشنائی دروازہ
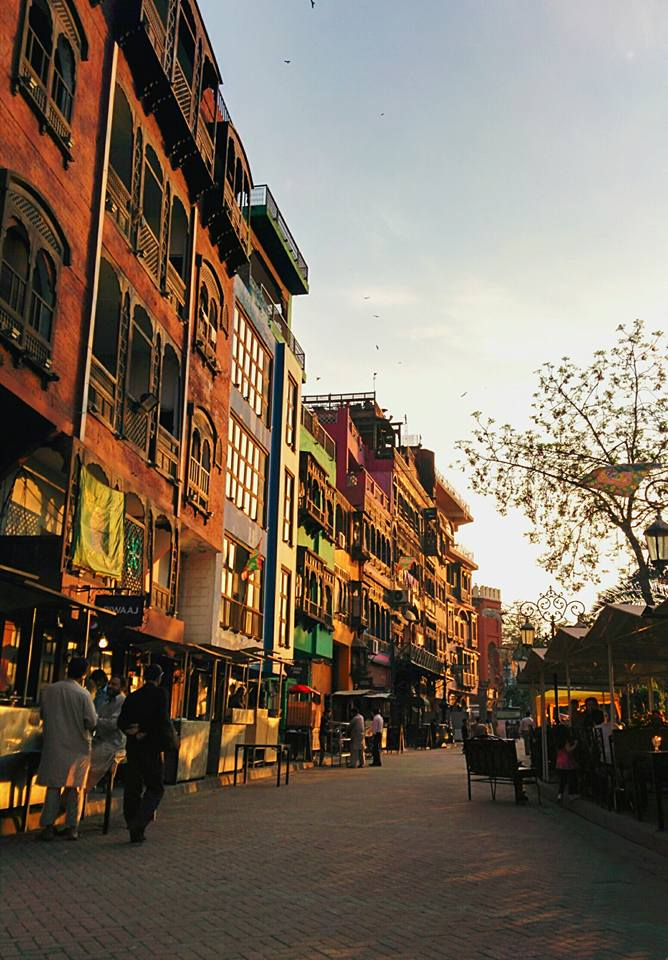
- Maintained by: City District Government Lahore
- From: Fort Road
- To: Shahi Mohalla Street

Fort Road Food Street (Punjabi: سڑک خوراک - روشنائی دروازہ, Sarak-e-Khorak - Roshnai Buha) is a food street located between Fort Road and Hazoori Bagh Gateway mostly misunderstood as Roshanai Gate of the Walled City in Lahore, Punjab, Pakistan. The street was reconstructed and opened in 2012 as a tourist attraction, by offering Lahori cuisine and views of Badshahi Mosque. The street was inaugurated on 21 January 2012, by Hamza Shahbaz Sharif to replace Gawalmandi Food Street. In 2013, the Walled City Lahore Authority (WCLA) took charge of the food street from the district government and gave it a major face-lift in collaboration with the private sector.

The Fort Road Food Street is known for traditional Lahori cuisine with a view of the Mughal-era Badshahi Mosque. The building that the street is based on was built during the era of the Mughal Empire and the British rule.

== See also ==
- Gawalmandi Food Street
- List of restaurant districts and streets
