= St. Angelo Fort =

Monument in south India

St. Angelo Fort, Kannur
- Fortaleza de Santo Ângelo de Cananor
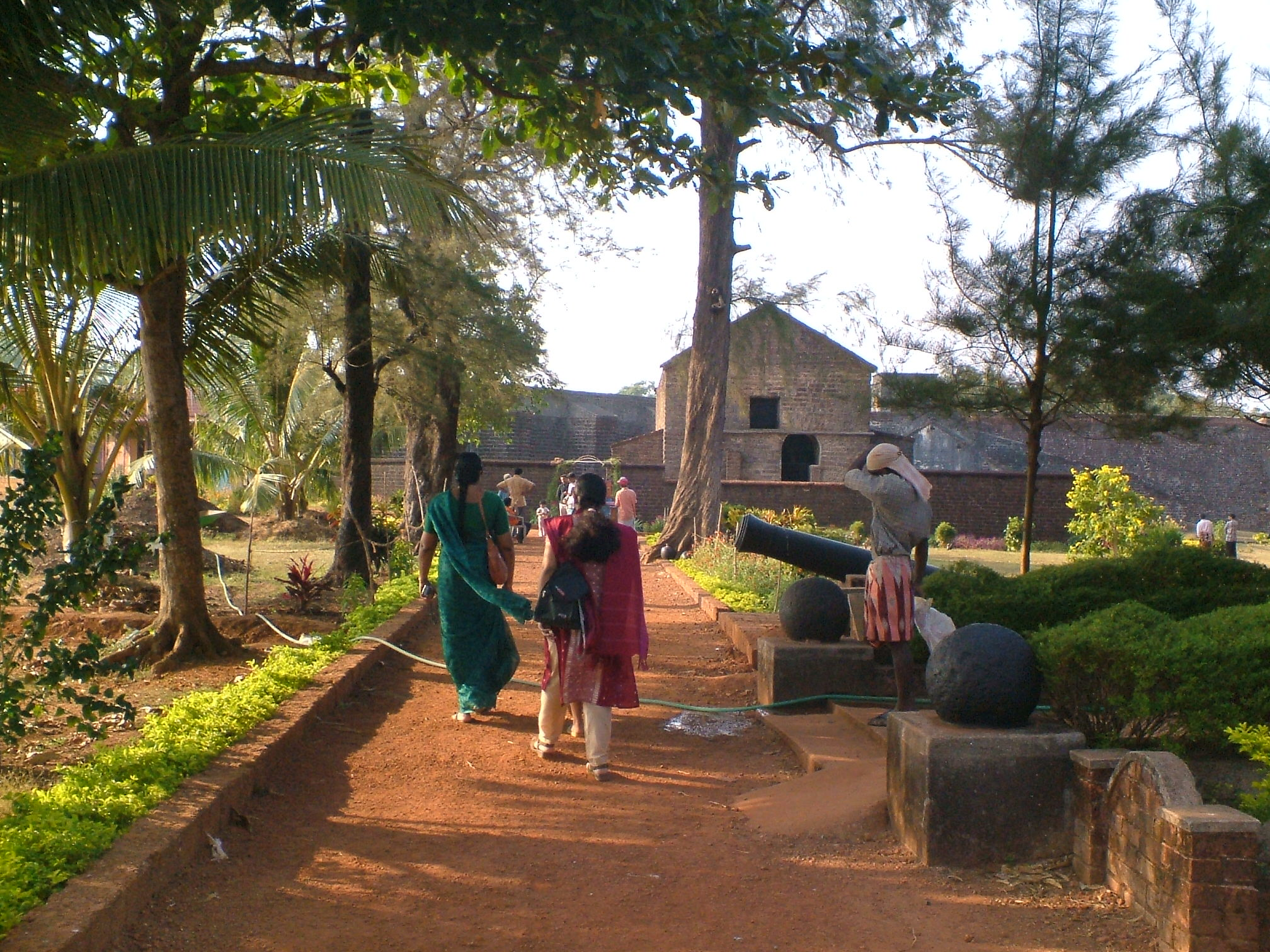
- Inside the St. Angelo Fort
- Interactive map of St. Angelo Fort, Kannur
- 11°51′15″N 75°22′19″E
- Location: Kannur, Kerala, India

St. Angelo Fort (also known as Kannur Fort or Kannur Kotta) is a fort facing the Arabian Sea, situated 3 km from Kannur, Kerala.

== History ==
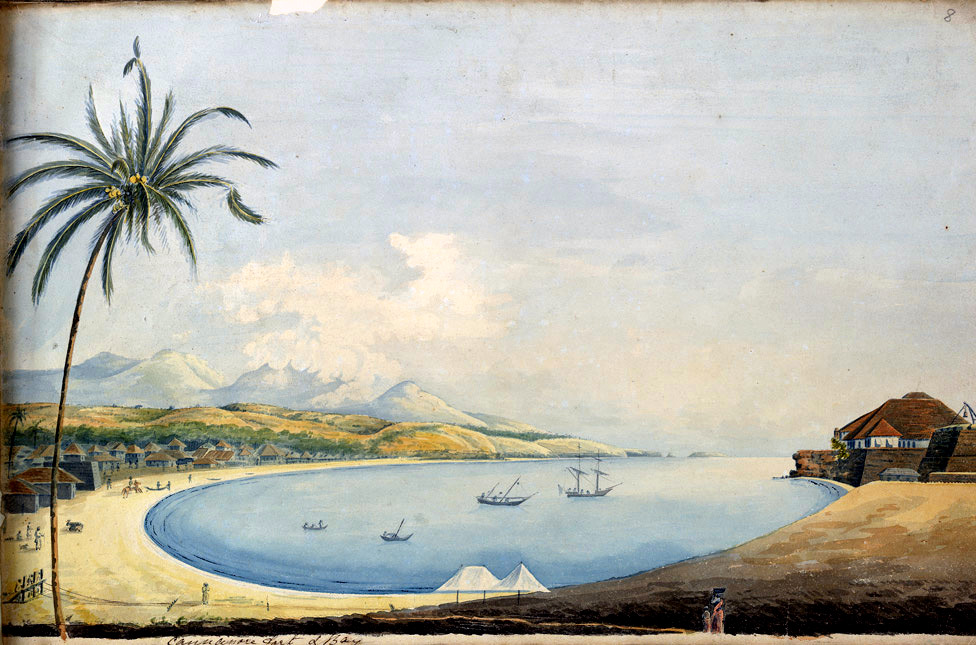
Cannonore fort & Bay'; a watercolor by John Johnston, c.1795-1801

In 1498, during Vasco da Gama's visit to India, the local Kolathiri king granted the land to Portuguese to build a settlement in present-day Kerala. On 23 October 1505, he gave the Portuguese leader Francisco de Almeida the permission to build a fort at the site. The construction activity began the very next day, on 24 October 1505, when Goncalo Gil Barbosa - the Portuguese factor of Cannanore (Kannur) - laid the foundation stone. The construction of the wooden fort was completed on 30 October 1505: its first Captain was Lourenco Britto, who led a garrison of 150 Portuguese men, and controlled two ships in the sea. After the fort was completed, Almeida began using the title "Viceroy", and in 1507 he started the construction of a stone fort at the site.

The fort was later attacked in vain by the local Indian ruler Zamorin and Kolathiri in the Siege of Cannanore (1507).

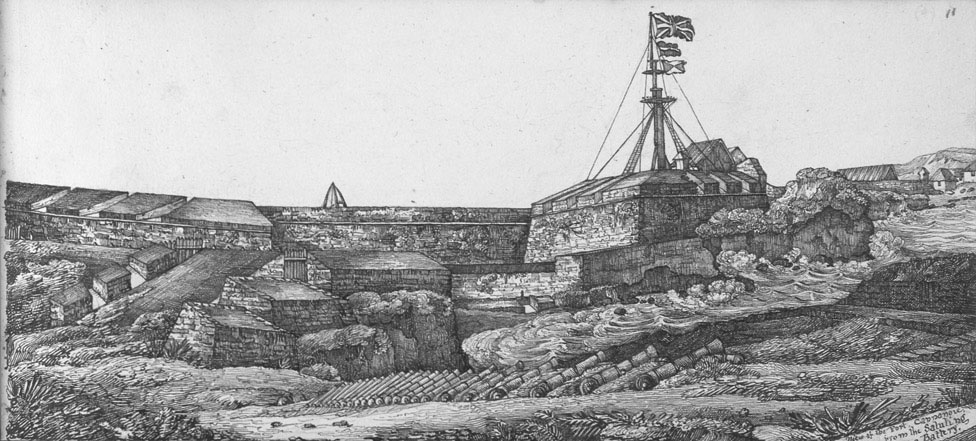
Fort at Kannur

In August 1509 Almeida, refusing to recognize Afonso de Albuquerque's as the new Portuguese governor to supersede himself, arrested him in this fortress after having fought the naval Battle of Diu. Afonso de Albuquerque was released after six months' confinement and become governor on the arrival of the grand-marshal of Portugal with a large fleet, in October 1509.

The fort provided naval supplies for the Portuguese conquest of Goa and the Portuguese battles against the Mamluk. As the local Portuguese settlement at Kannur had no sources of revenue, the fort's expenses were met with funding from Goa, the seat of Portuguese rule in India.

On 15 February 1663, the Dutch captured the fort from the Portuguese. They modernised the fort and built the bastions Hollandia, Zeelandia and Frieslandia that are the major features of the present structure. The original Portuguese fort was pulled down later. A painting of this fort and the fishing ferry behind it can be seen in the Rijksmuseum Amsterdam. The Dutch sold the fort to king Ali Raja of Arakkal in 1772. In 1790 the British seized it and used it as their chief military station in Malabar until 1947.

The fort is in the Cannanore Cantonment area. It is fairly well preserved as a protected monument under the Archaeological Survey of India. St Angelo's fort is a most important historical monument and a popular tourist attraction. Six Tourism Policeman are posted here for protection duty.

In 2015, thousands of cannonballs weighing several kilos were discovered from the Fort premises. The Archaeological Survey of India, which led the excavation, believes these were buried as part of military preparedness.

== Present status ==
The Moppila Bay Harbor and Arakkal Mosque are near the fort. The fort is now well-maintained under the supervision of the Archaeological Survey of India. The fort is open to tourists.

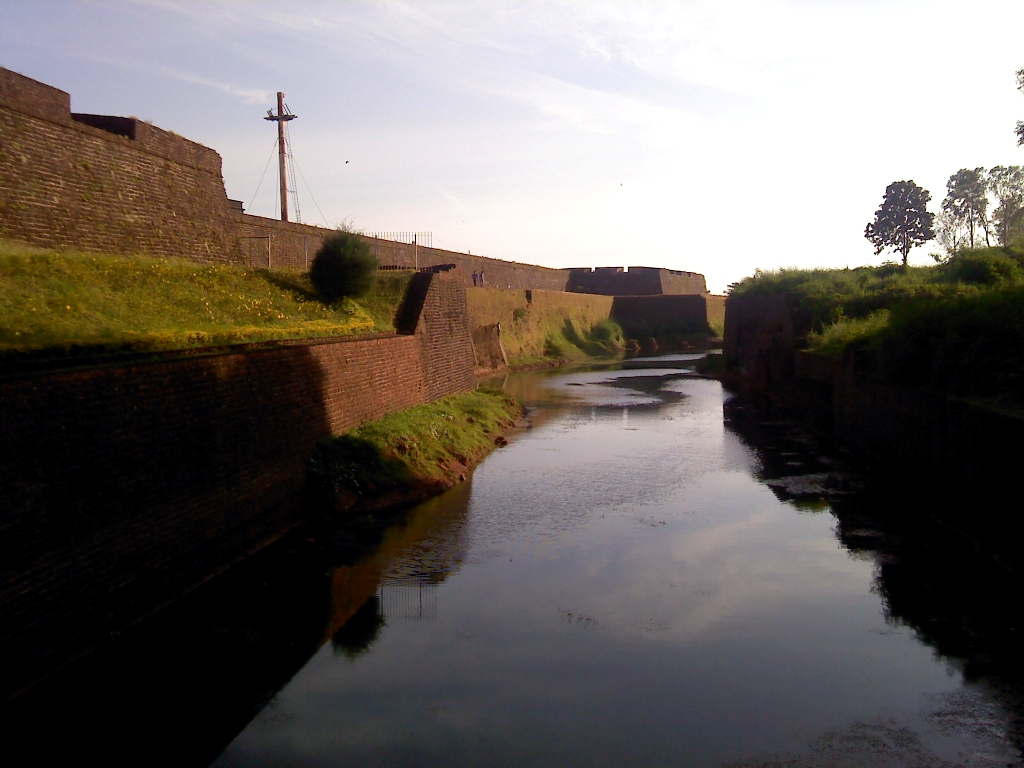
St. Angelo Fort

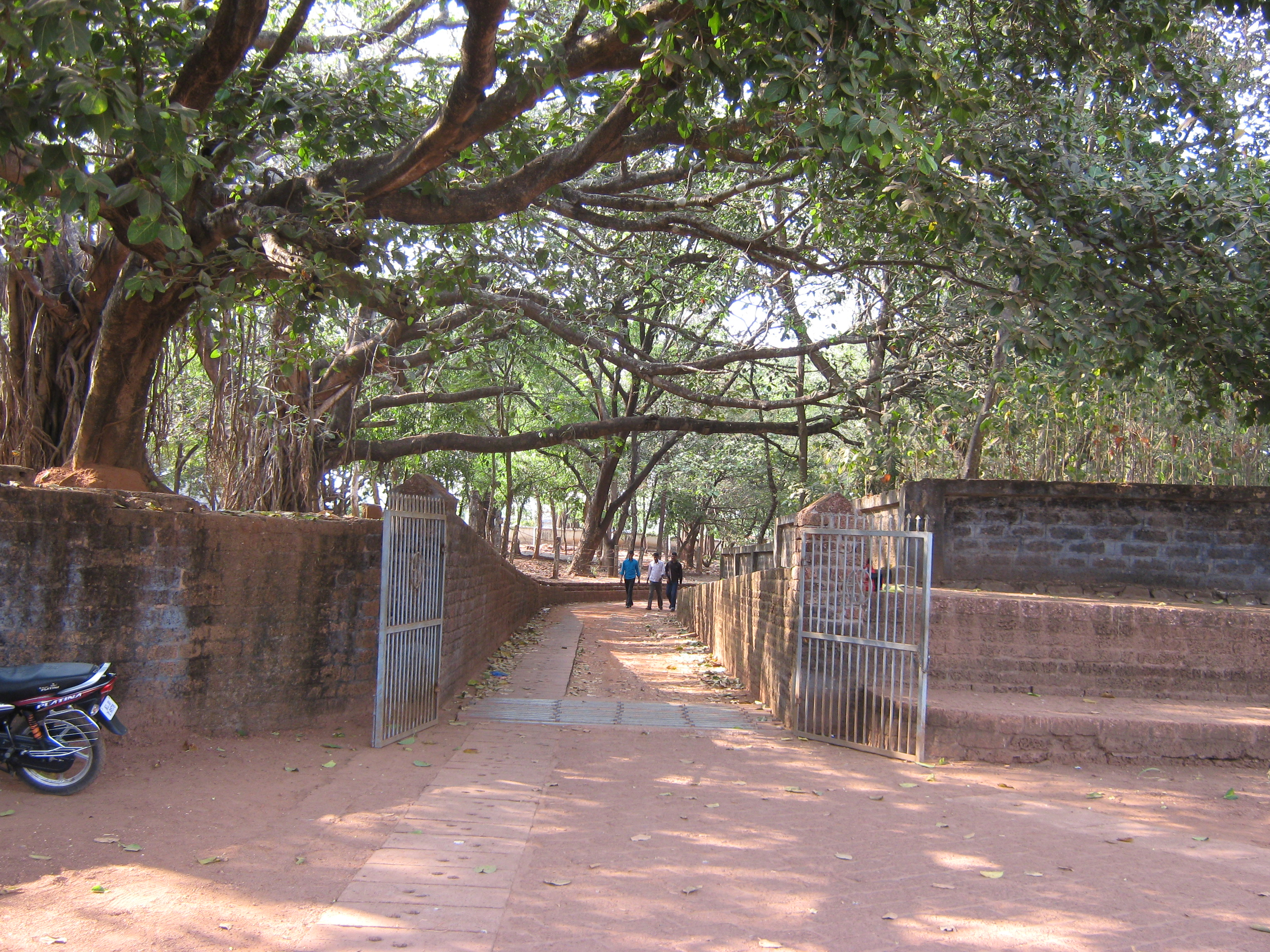
The Fort Gate

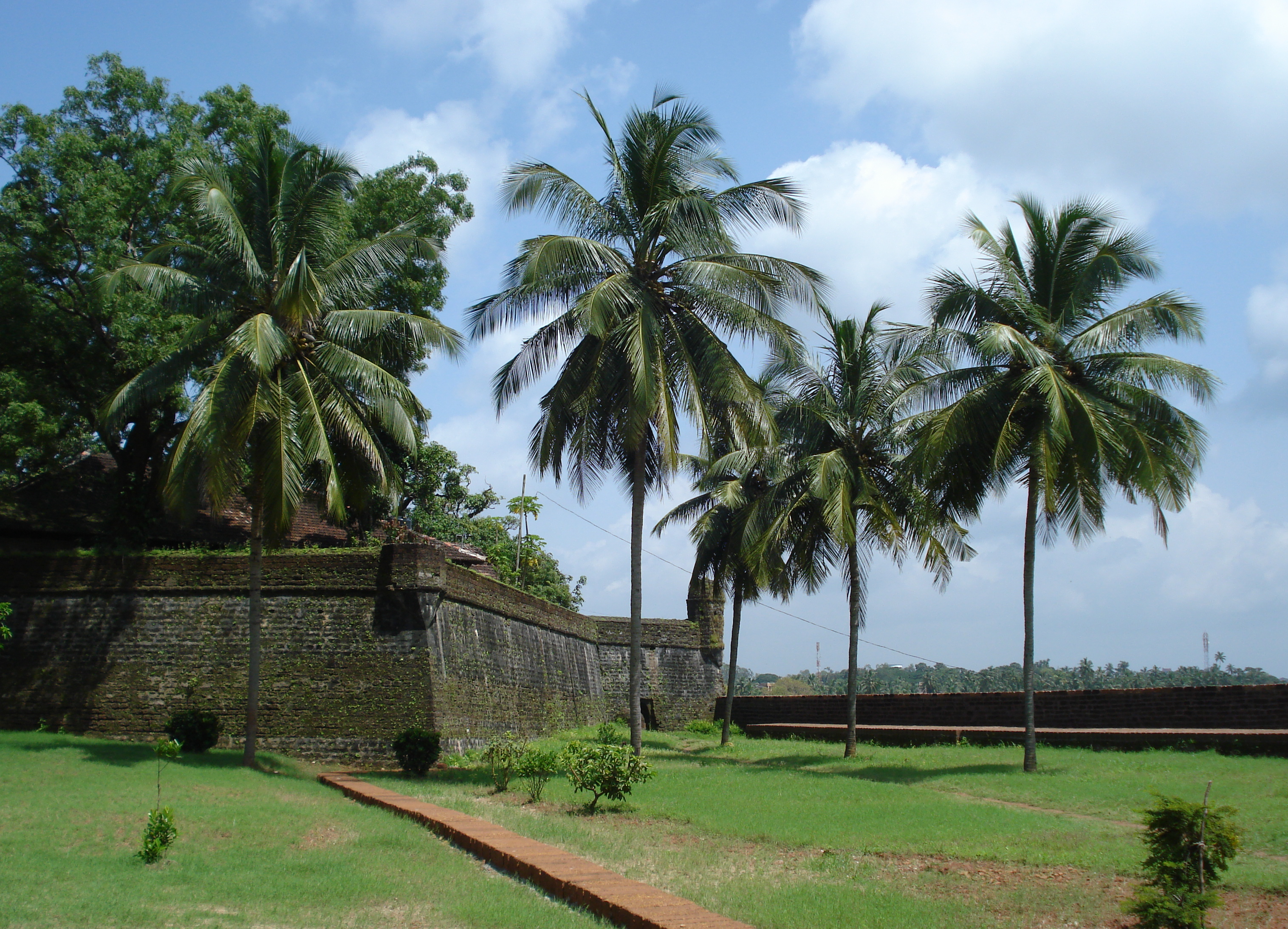
Kannur fort, inside view

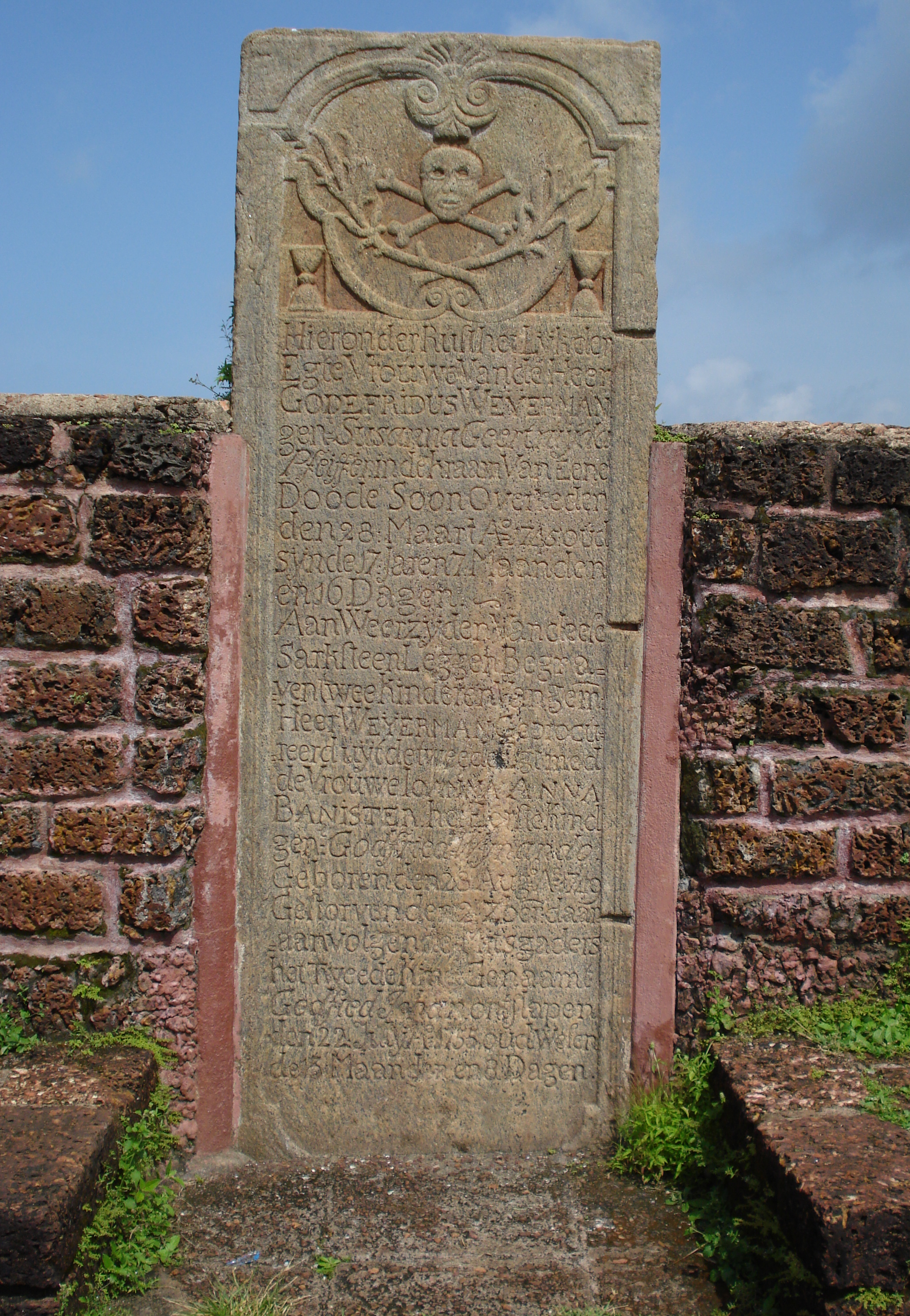
The Grave stone of Dutch commandents wife and two children with Dutch inscriptions

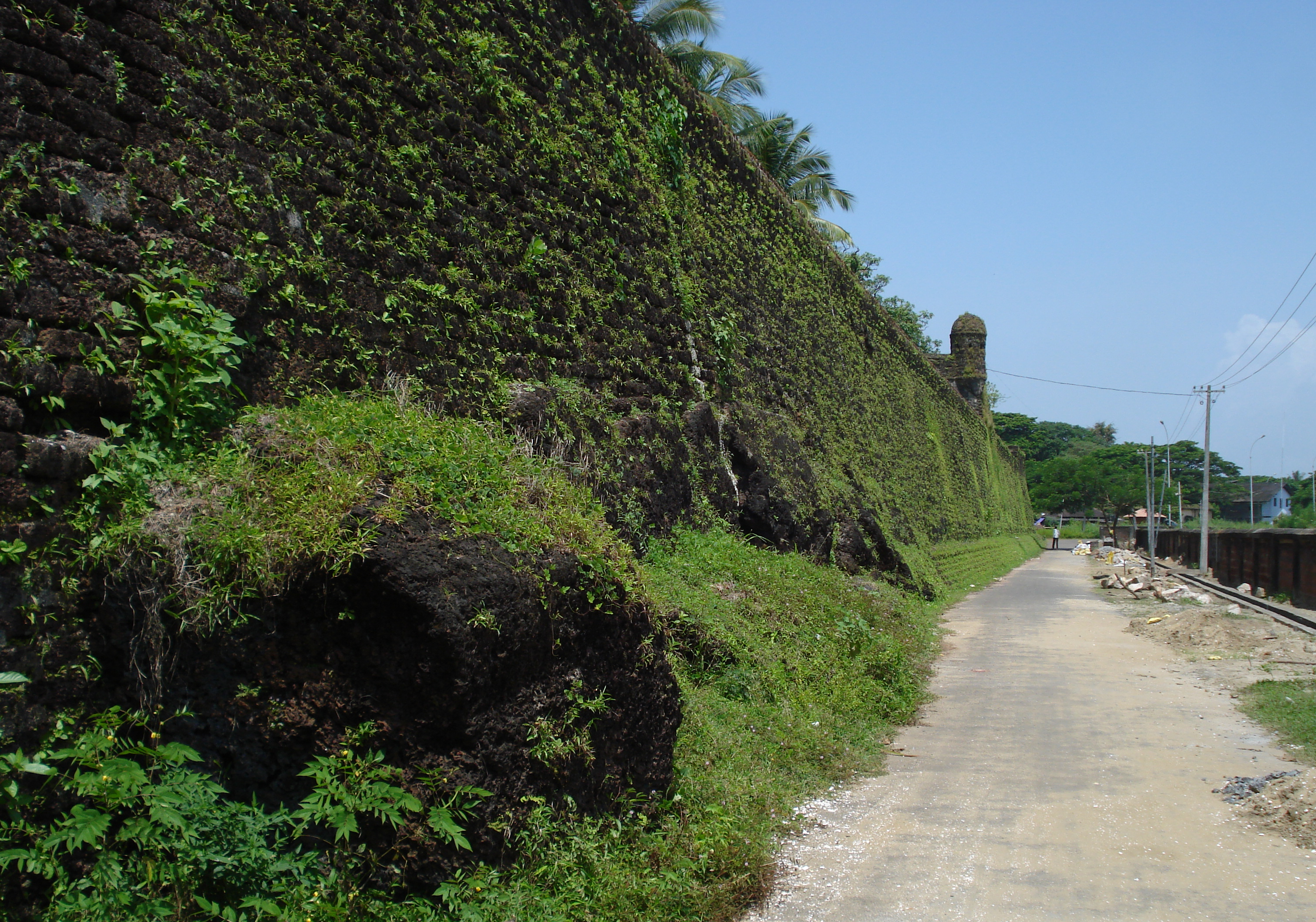
The watchtower

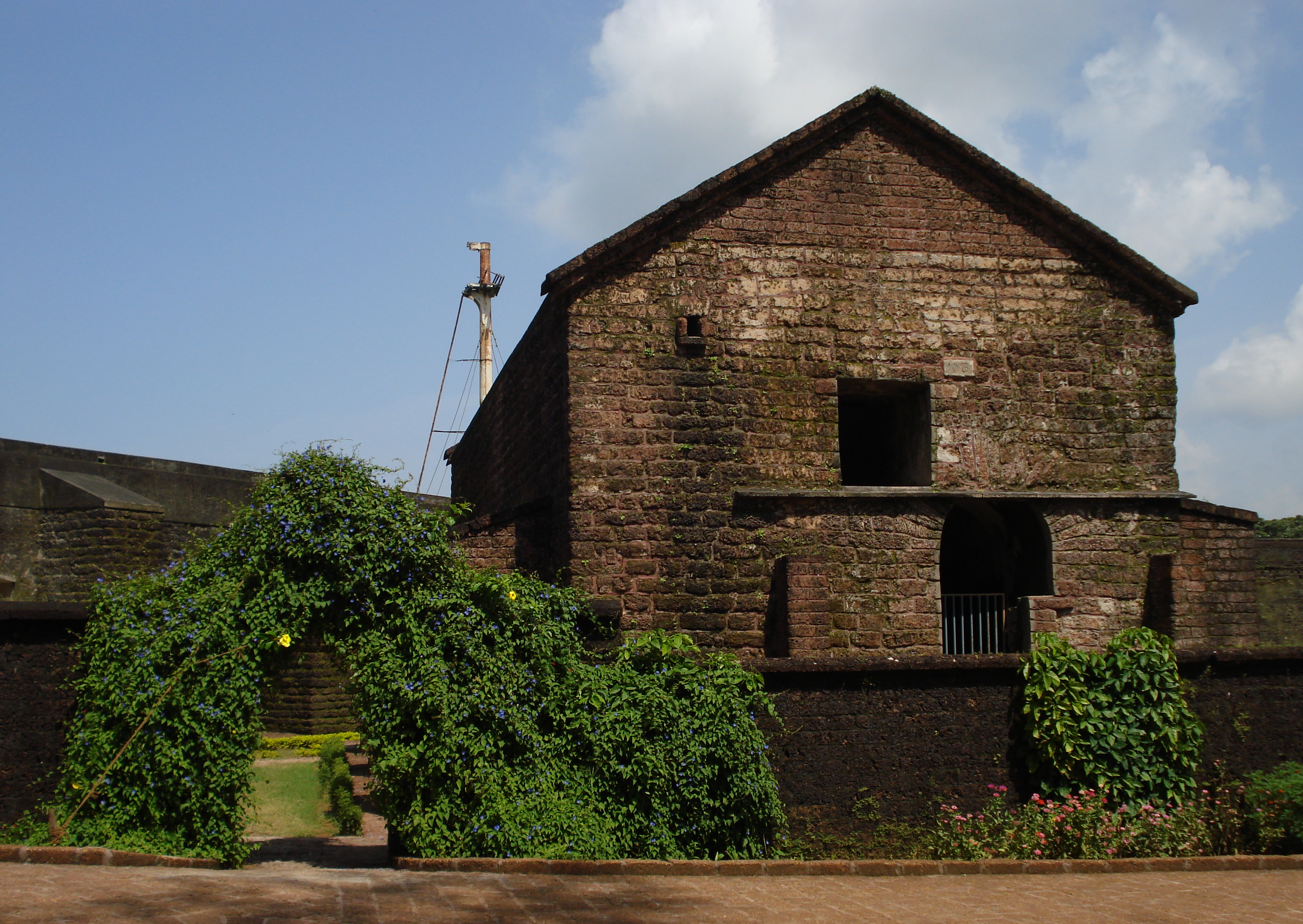
The chapel inside the fort after the restoration

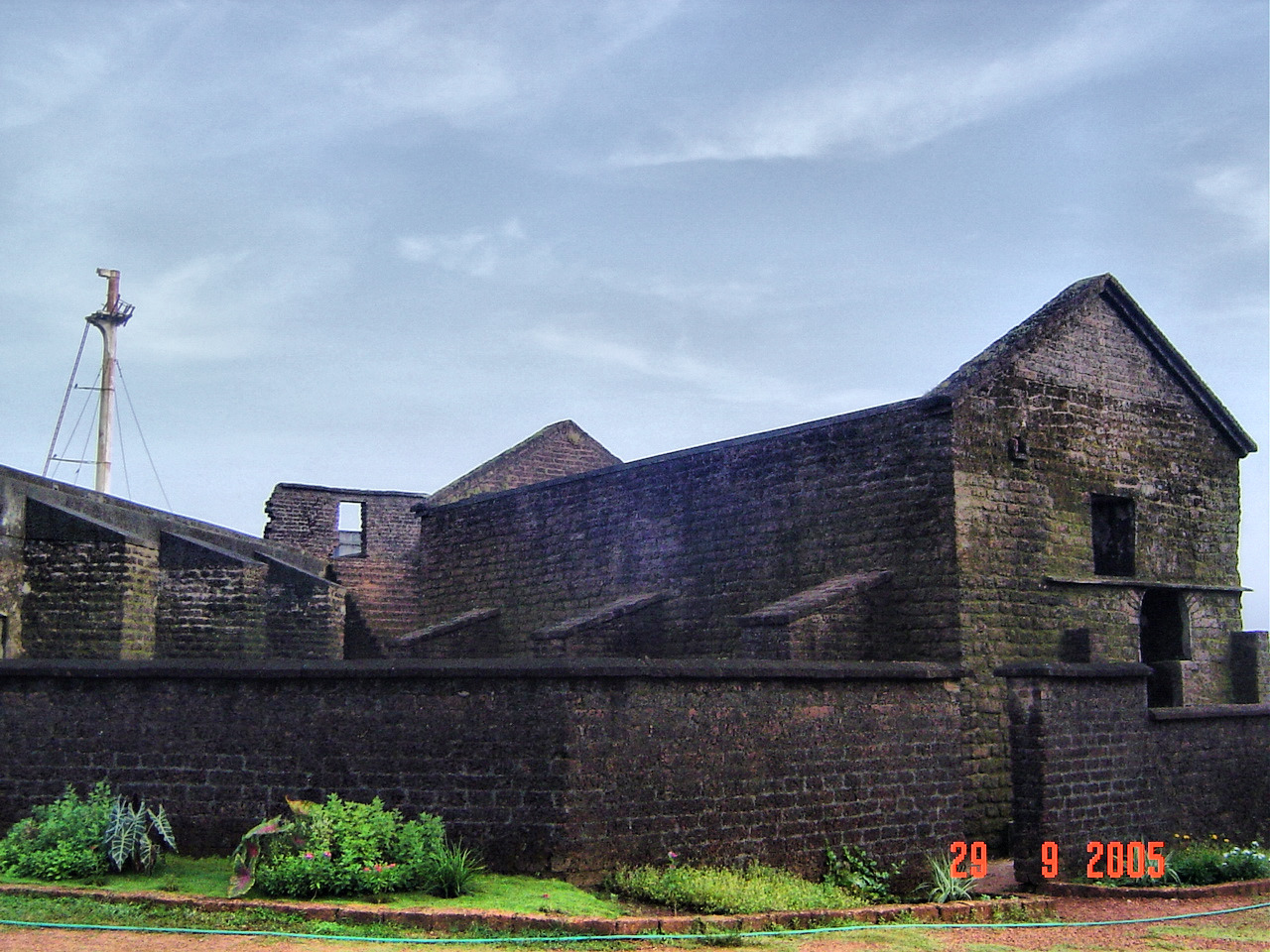
Chapel inside the fort different view

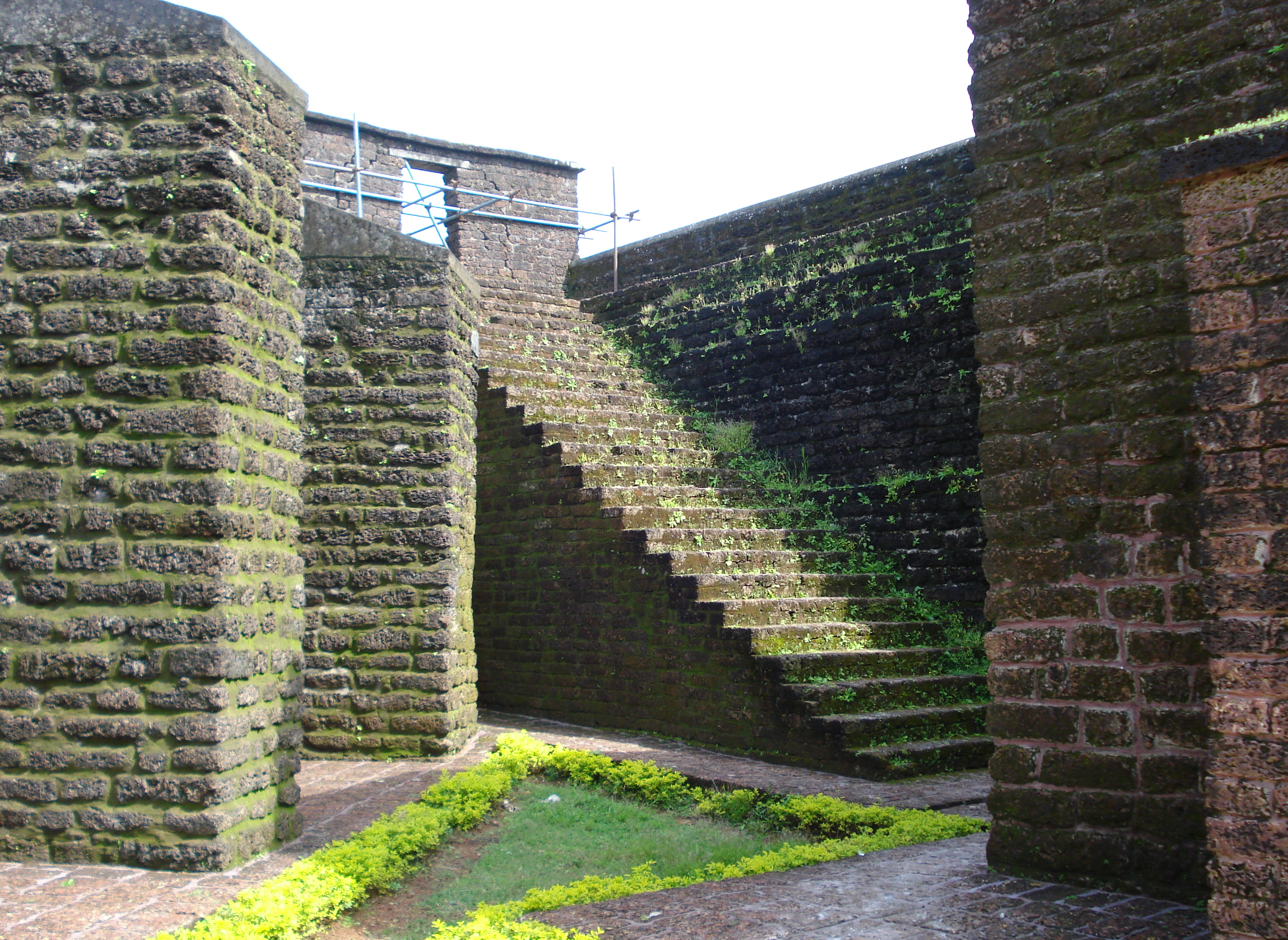
The stairway leads to the top of the fort wall. Note that the entire fort is made with laterite material.

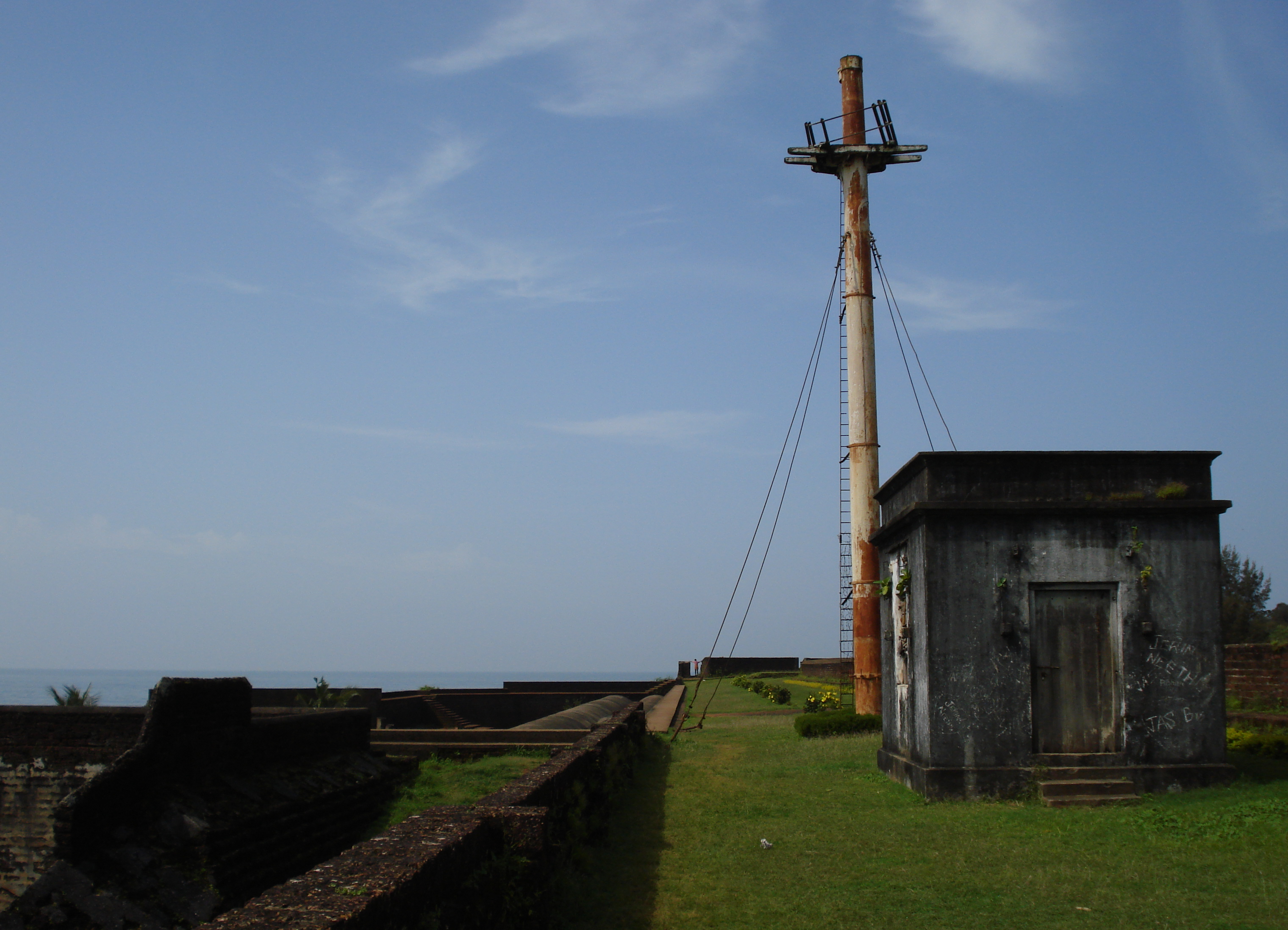
Remains of the early oil lamp lighthouse inside the fort

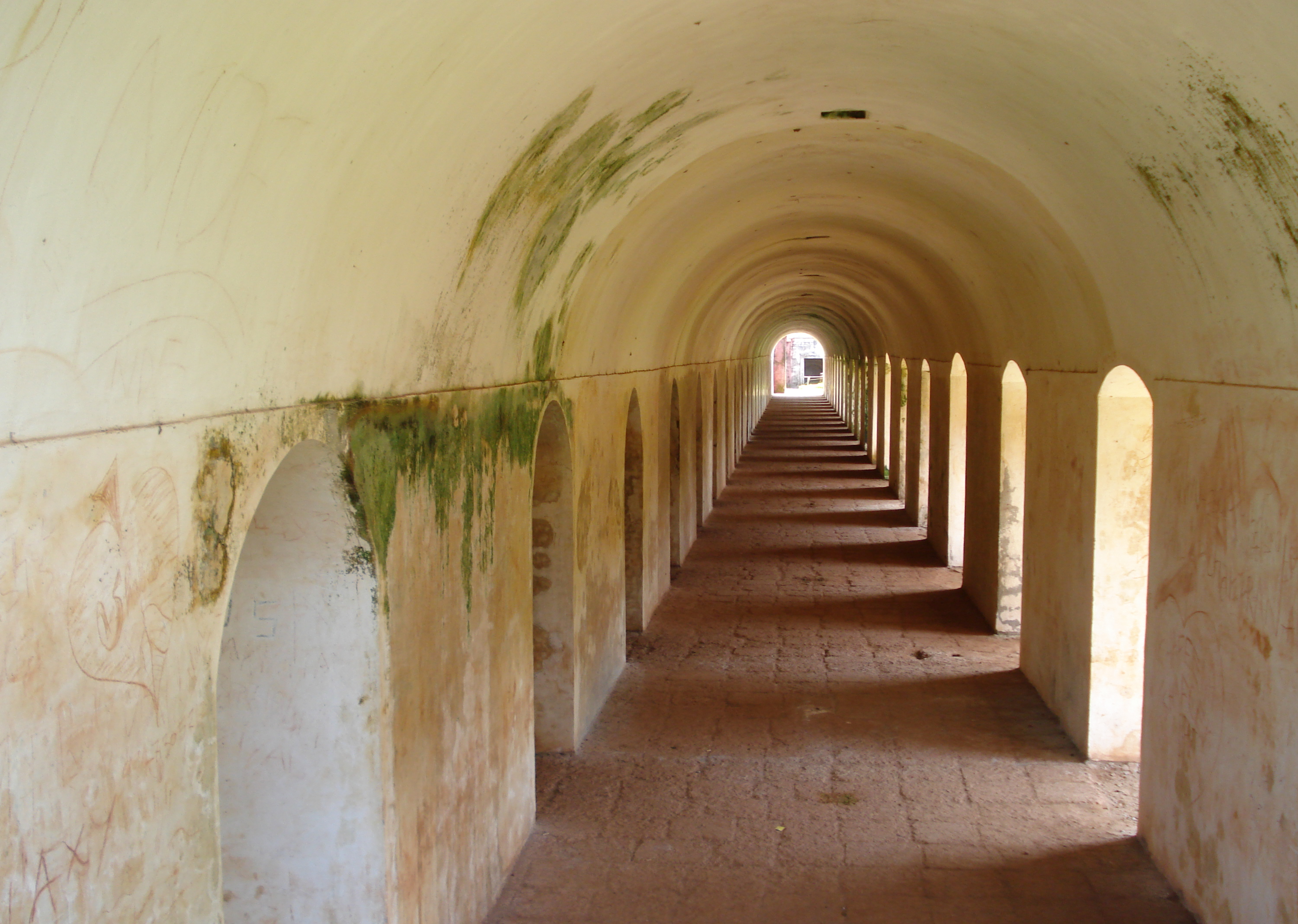
Inside view of the army barracks

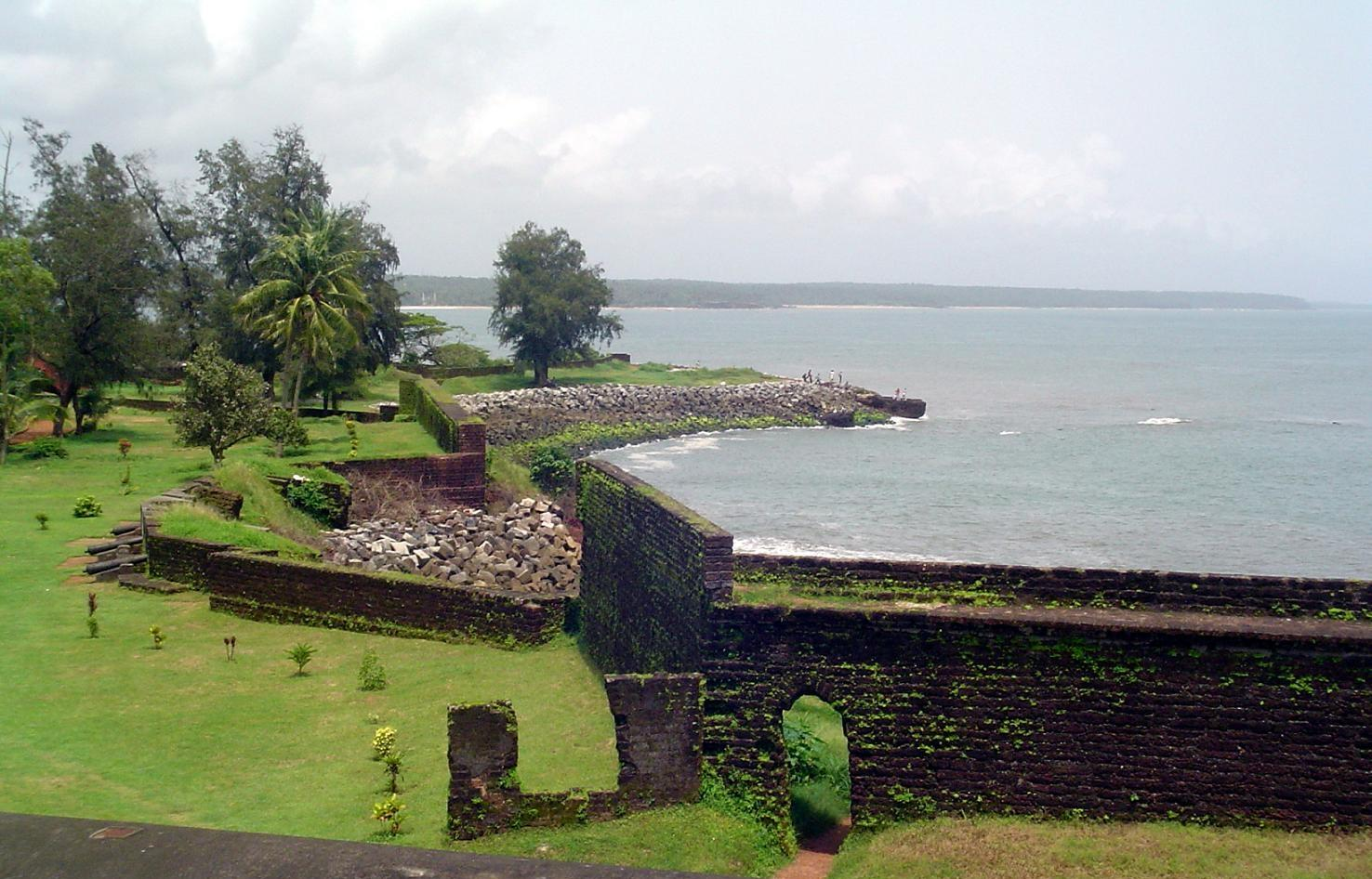
Another view from the top of the stable

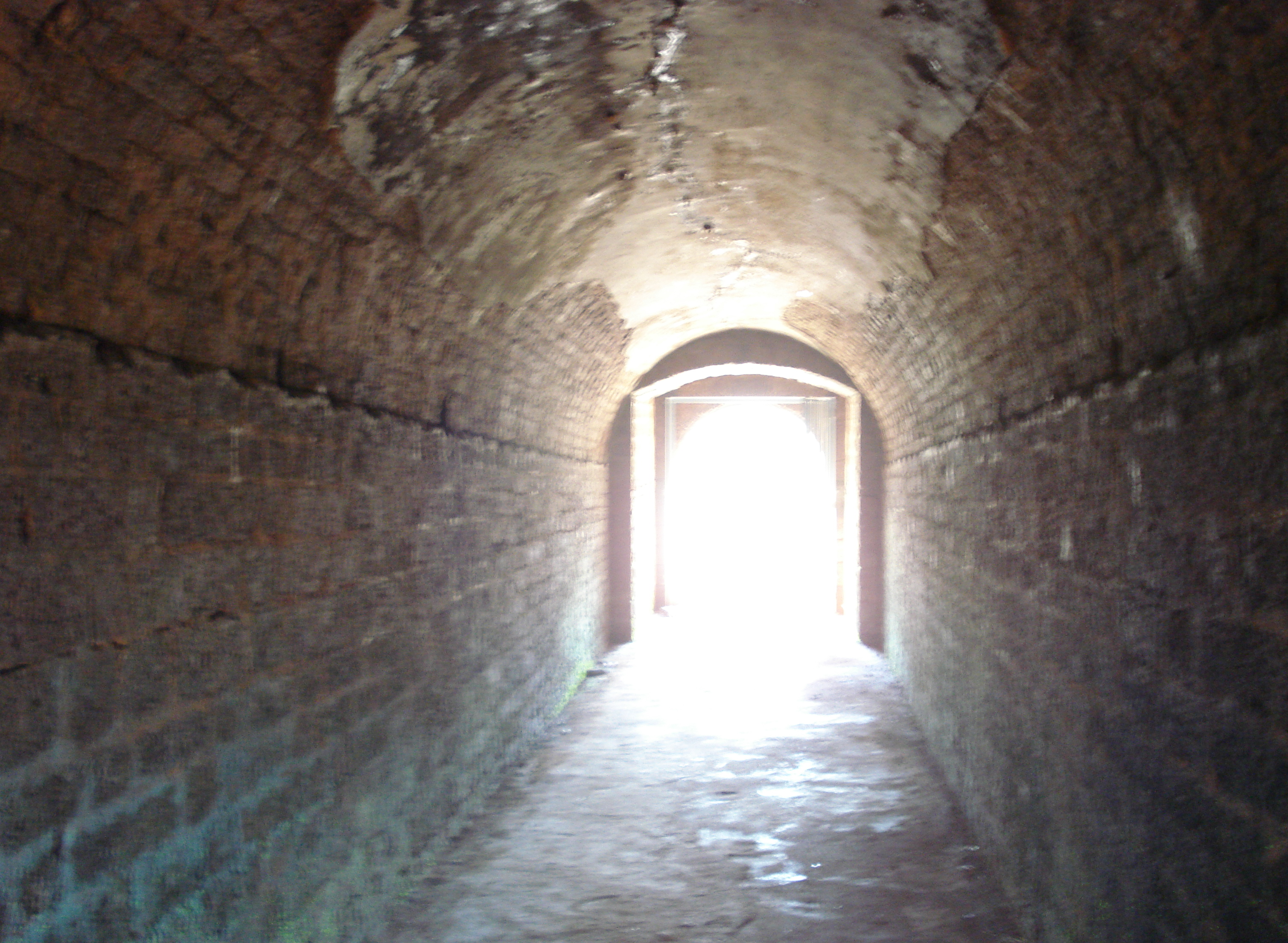
The old entrance to the fort

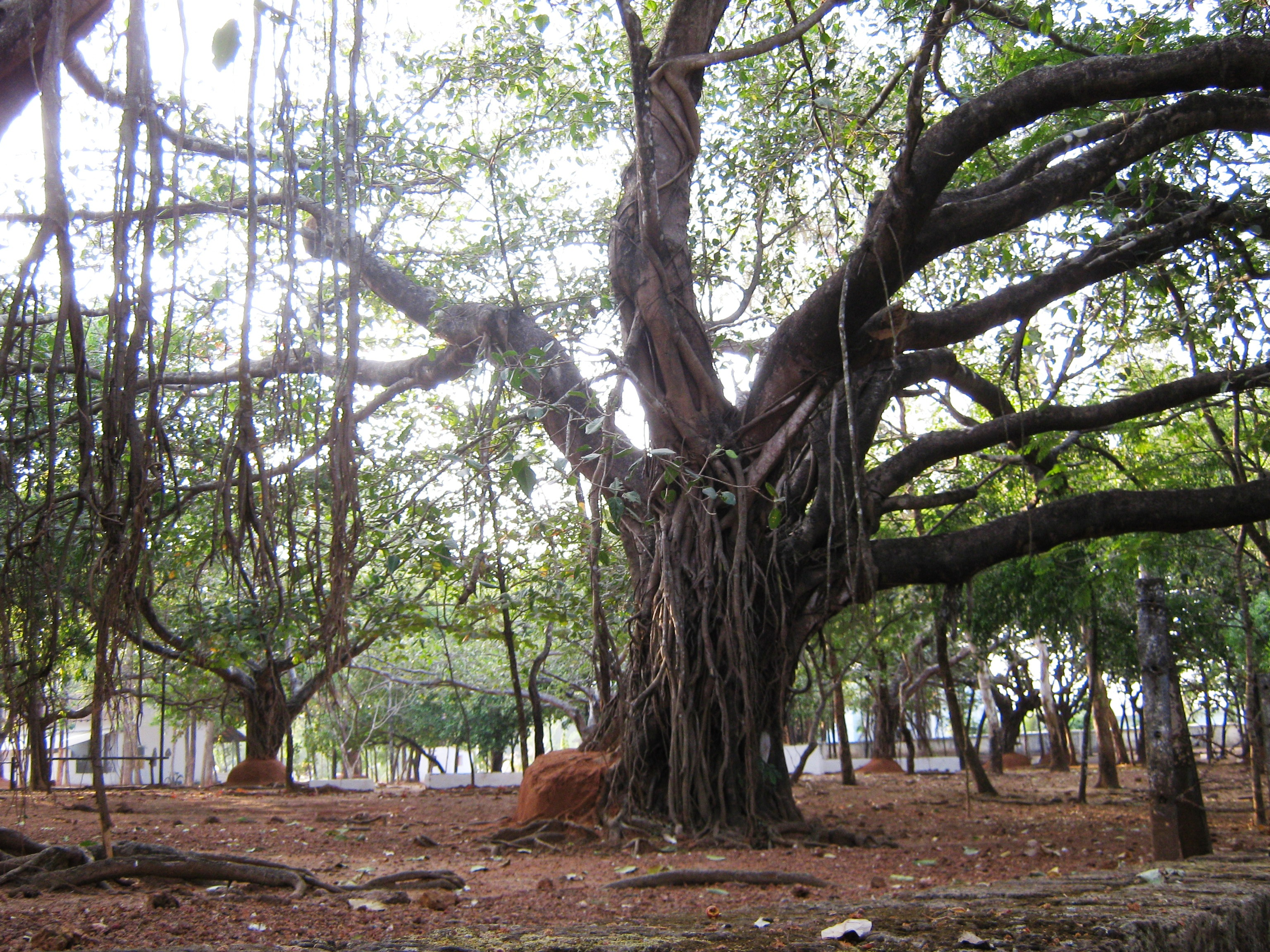
Entrance to the fort

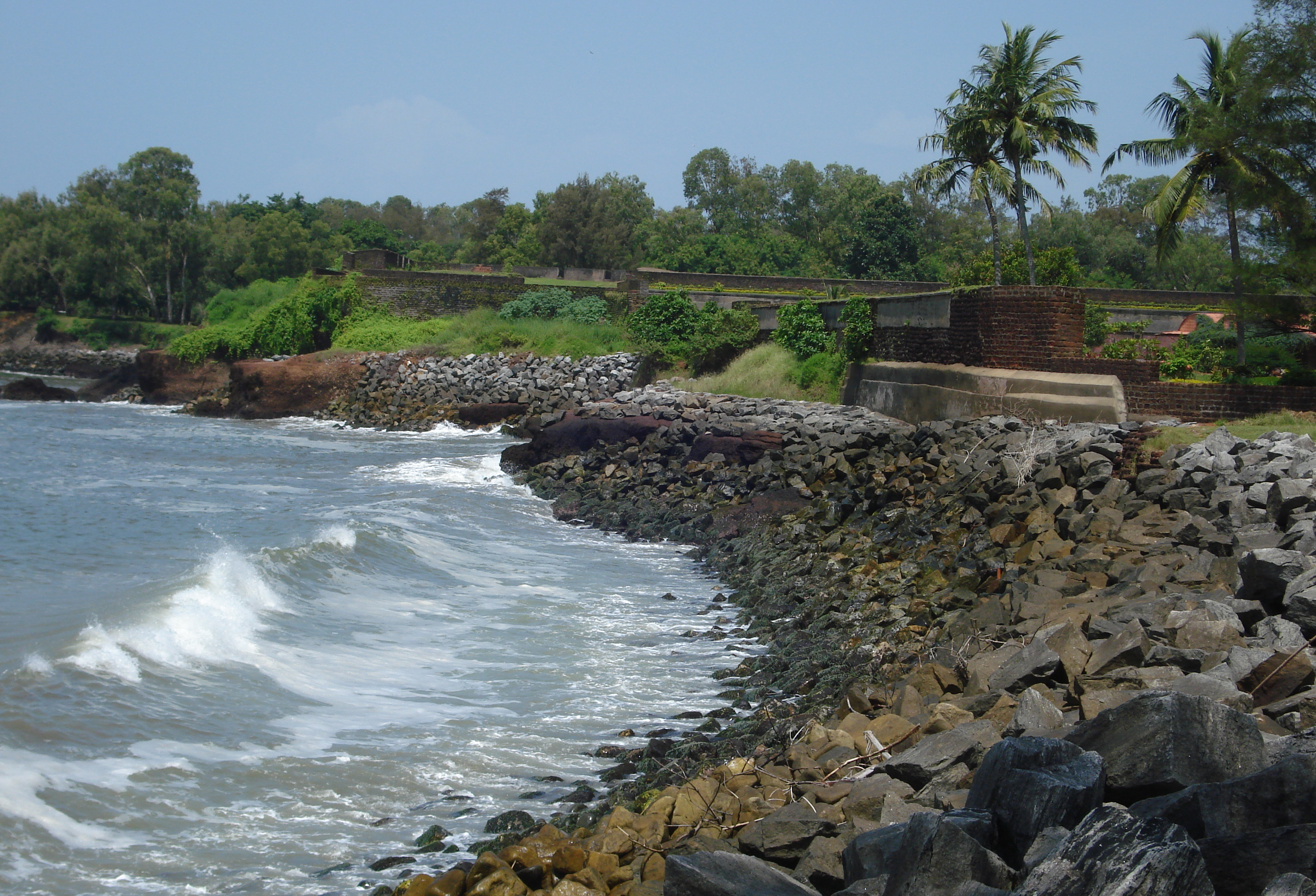
Kannur Fort and Arabian Sea

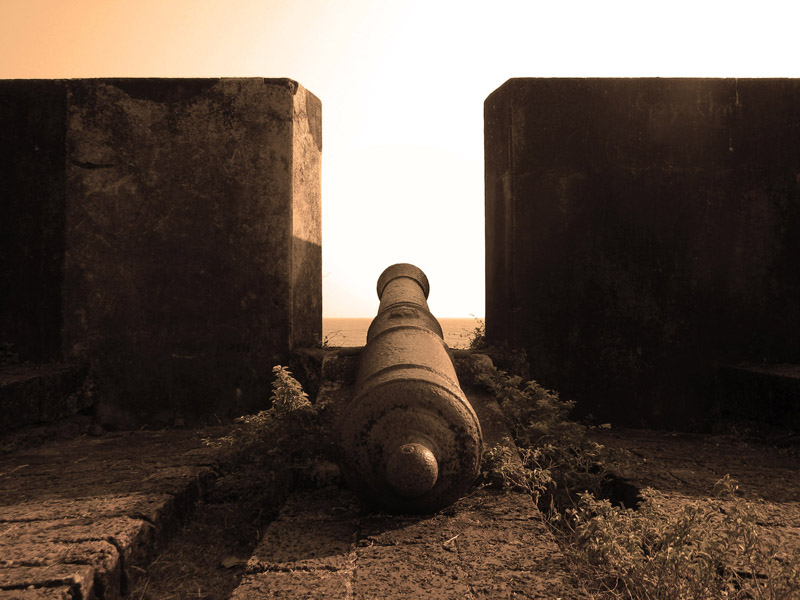
A cannon at Kannur fort

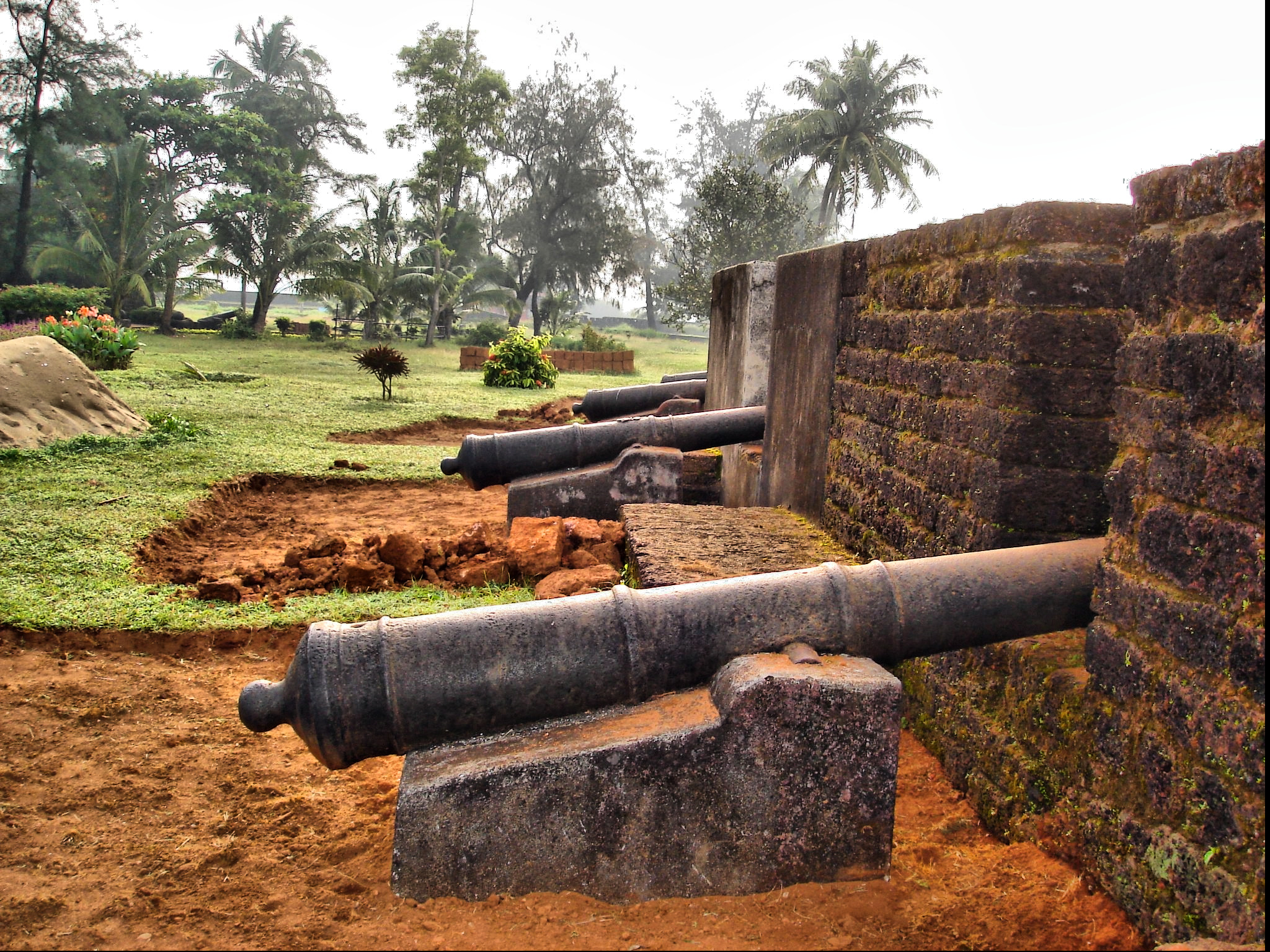
Cannons at Kannur fort

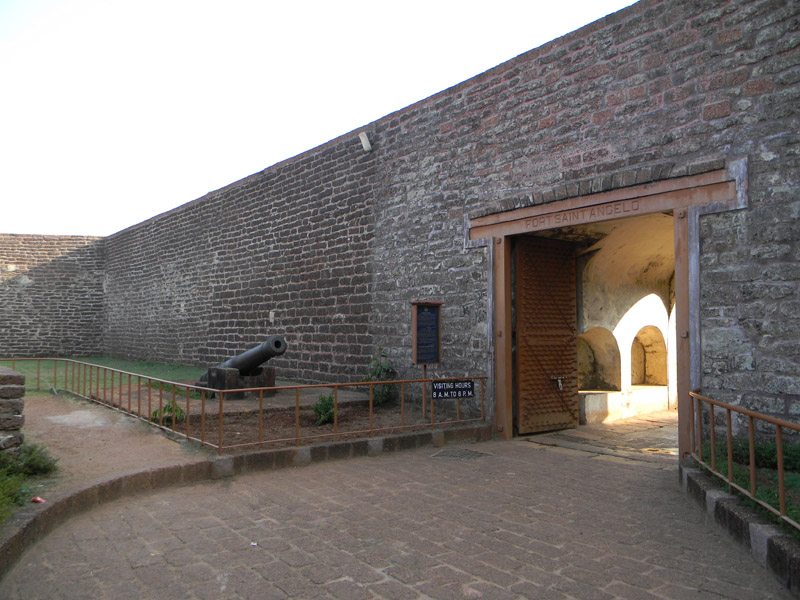
Main entrance

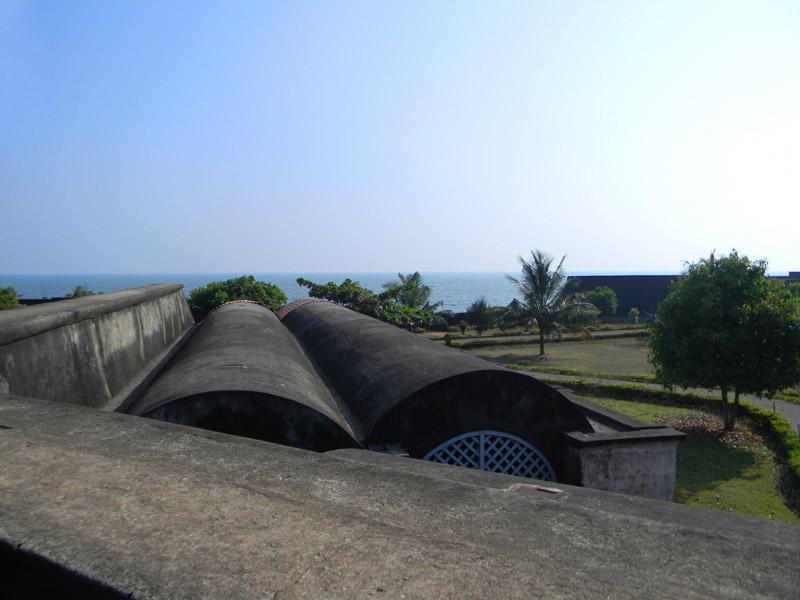
View from the top

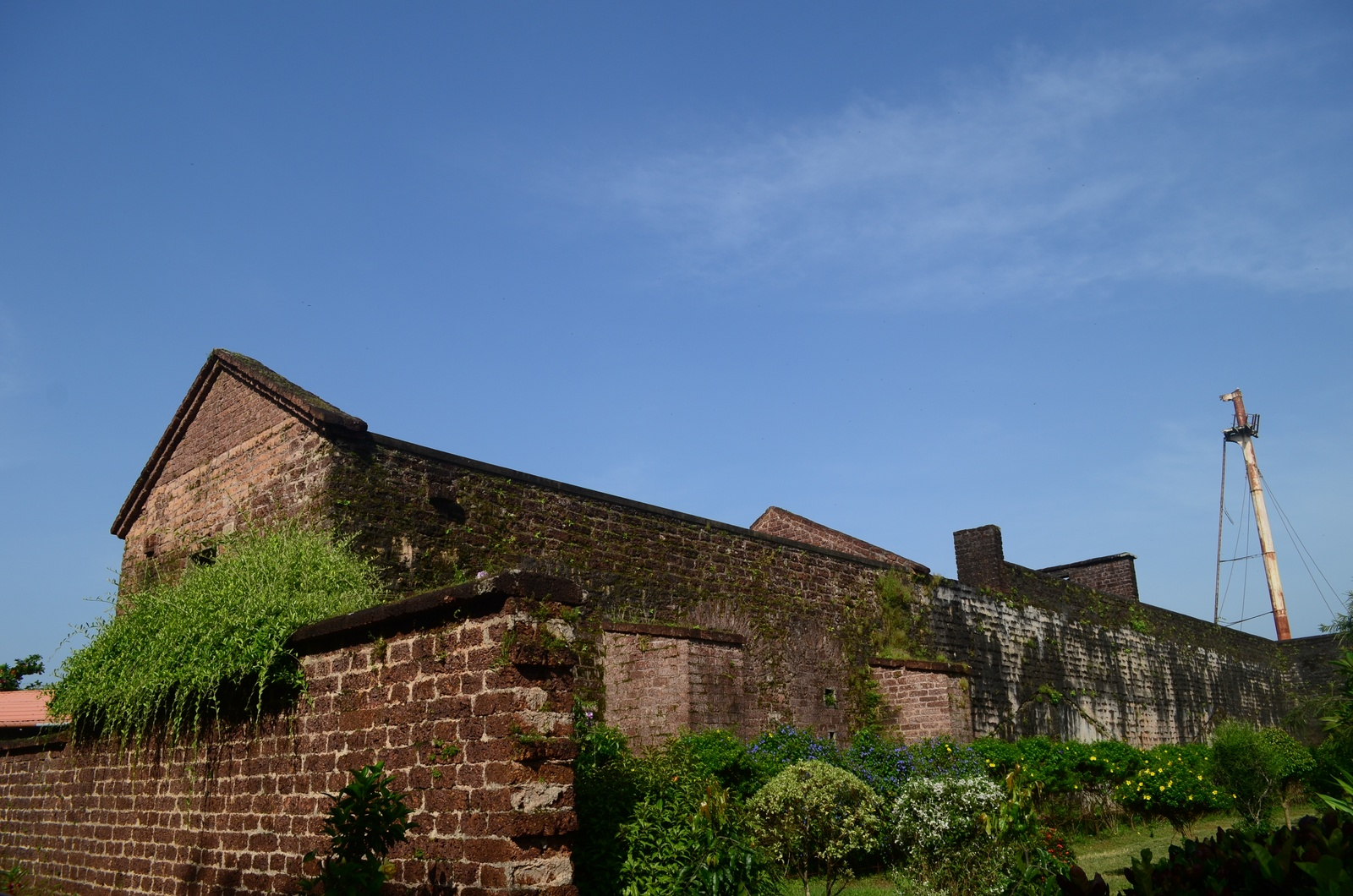
St. Angelo Fort, Kannur
