= Chalad =

- Neighbourhood
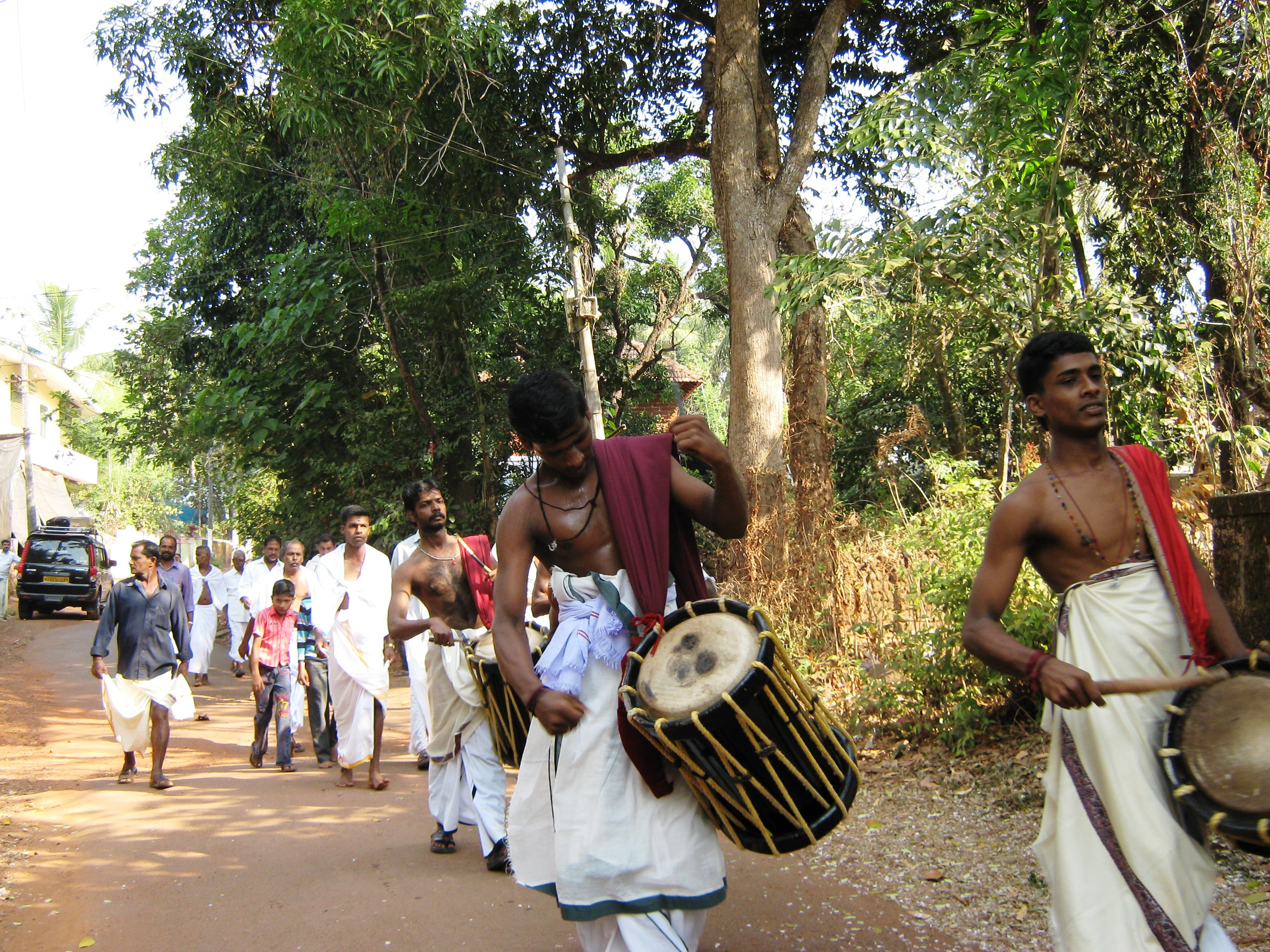
- Temple Procession in Chalad
- Interactive map of Chalad
- Coordinates: 11°53′00″N 75°21′00″E
- Country: India
- State: Kerala
- District: Kannur

Government
  - Type: Kannur Municipal Corporation

Languages
  - Official: Malayalam, English
- Time zone: UTC+5:30 (IST)
- N: 670014
- Telephone code: 0497
- ISO 3166 code: IN-KL
- Vehicle registration: KL-13
- Lok Sabha constituency: Kannur
- Climate: humid (Köppen)

Chalad is a neighborhood in Kannur Municipal Corporation in Kerala state, India.

== Location ==
It is located on the route that runs from Kannur city to Azhikode, and it is one of the shortest ways to Mangalore highway from Kannur.

== Tourism ==
Kerala's Payyambalam beach is a major tourist attraction in this region. There are four A class theaters in Chalad. It is also the biggest part of Kannur city. Chalad Sree Dharma Shastha temple is one of the most sacred and old Aiyyappa Temples in Kerala. There is also one of the biggest mosques in Kannur. This area also bears a posh residential area for Kannur. Chalad is the political hub of Kannur city.

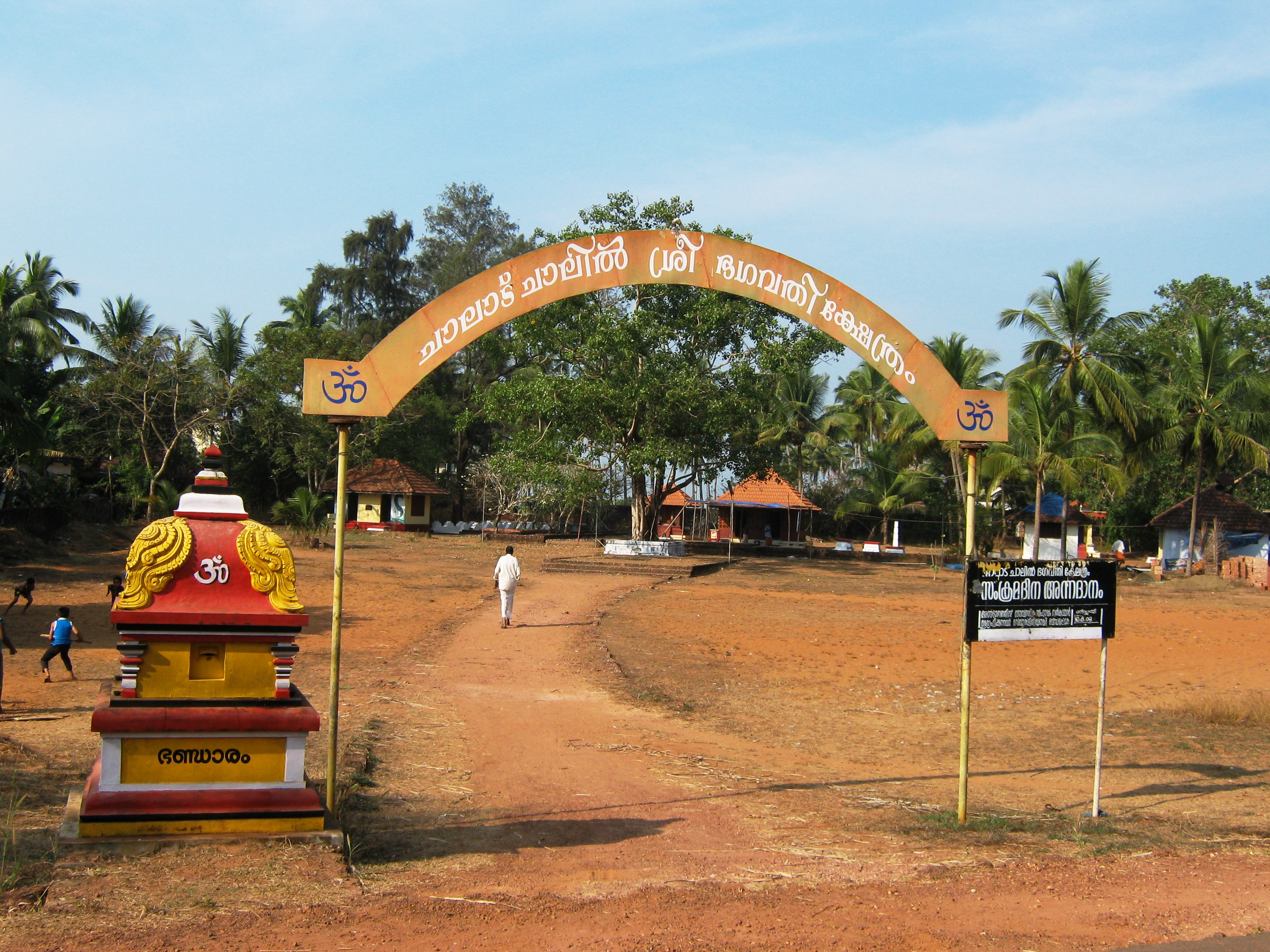
Chalad Chalil Bhagavathy Temple

== Transportation ==
Chalad town is located in Kannur- Alavil-Azhikode road. This town is the busiest stretch on this road. This road connects Kannur city towards Azhikkal Port. Chalad town is connected towards National Highway via Chalad-Pannanpara road. This Highway connected towards Mangalore, Goa and Mumbai can be accessed on the northern side and Kozhikode, Cochin and Thiruvananthapuram can be accessed on the southern side. The nearest railway station are Chirakkal railway station and Kannur Railway Station on Mangalore-Palakkad line. Trains are available to almost all parts of India subject to advance booking over the internet. There are airports at Mattanur, Mangalore and Calicut. All of them are international airports but direct flights are available only to Middle Eastern countries.

== Image gallery ==
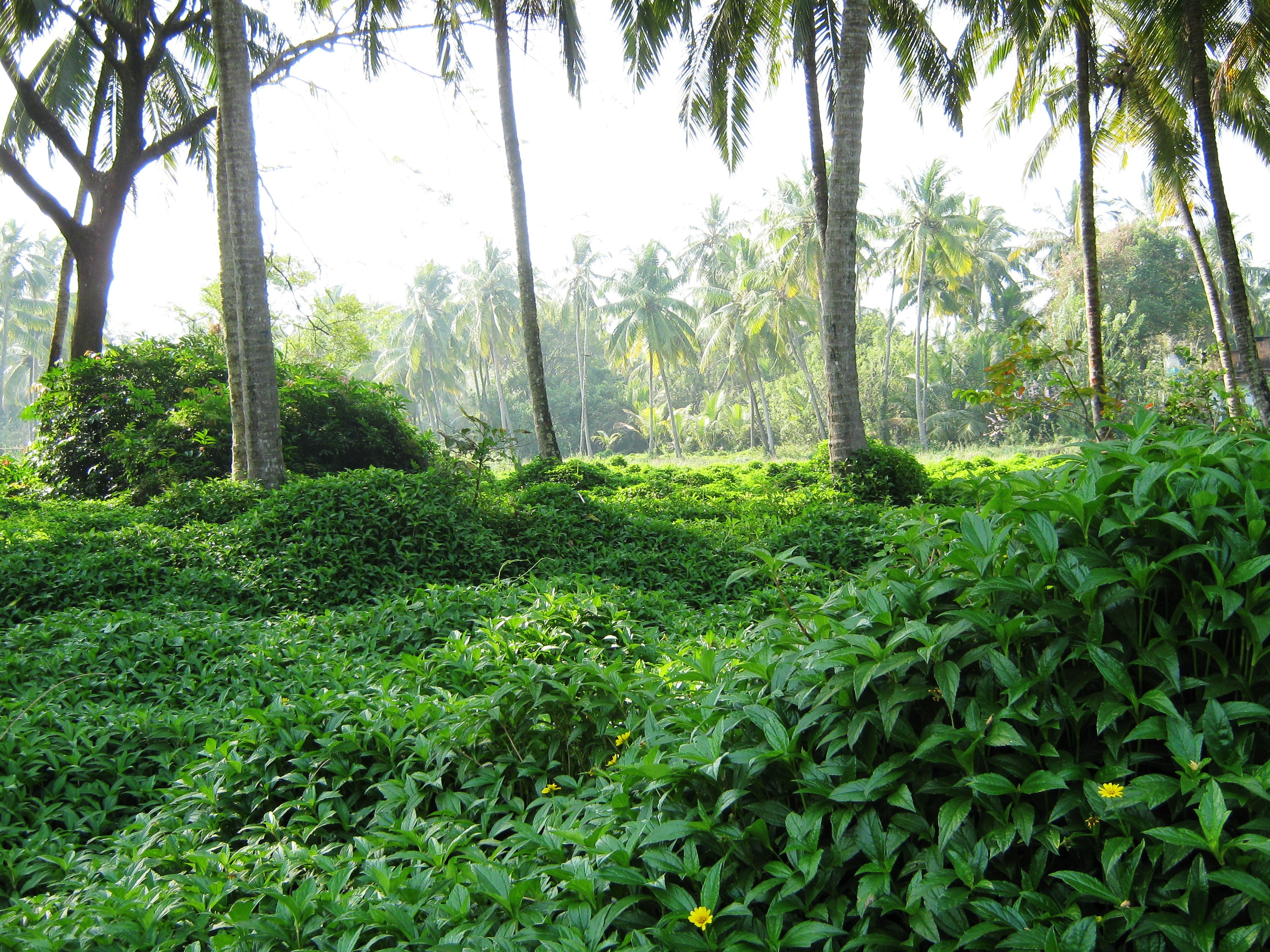
Greenery in Chalad

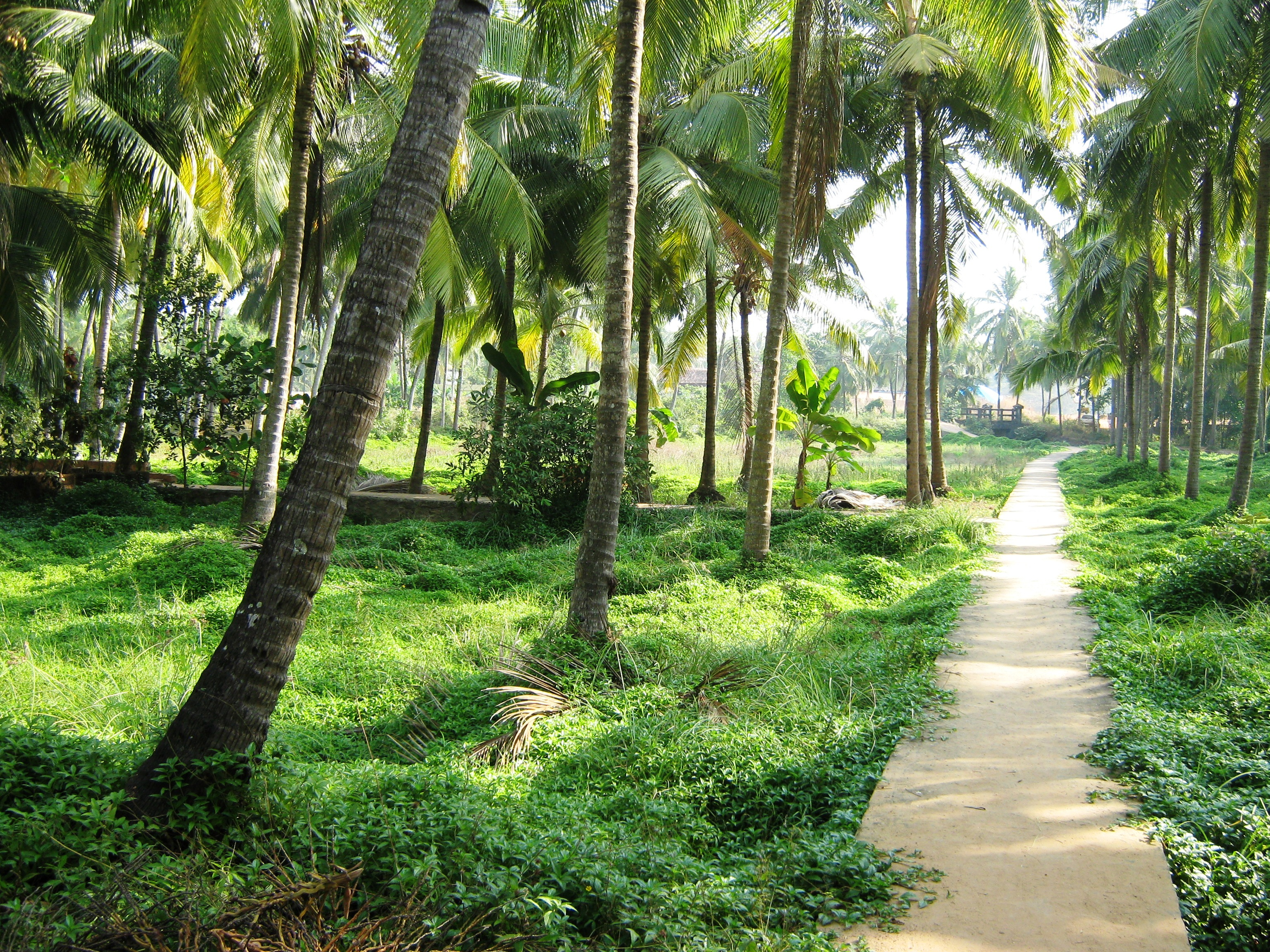
Footpath

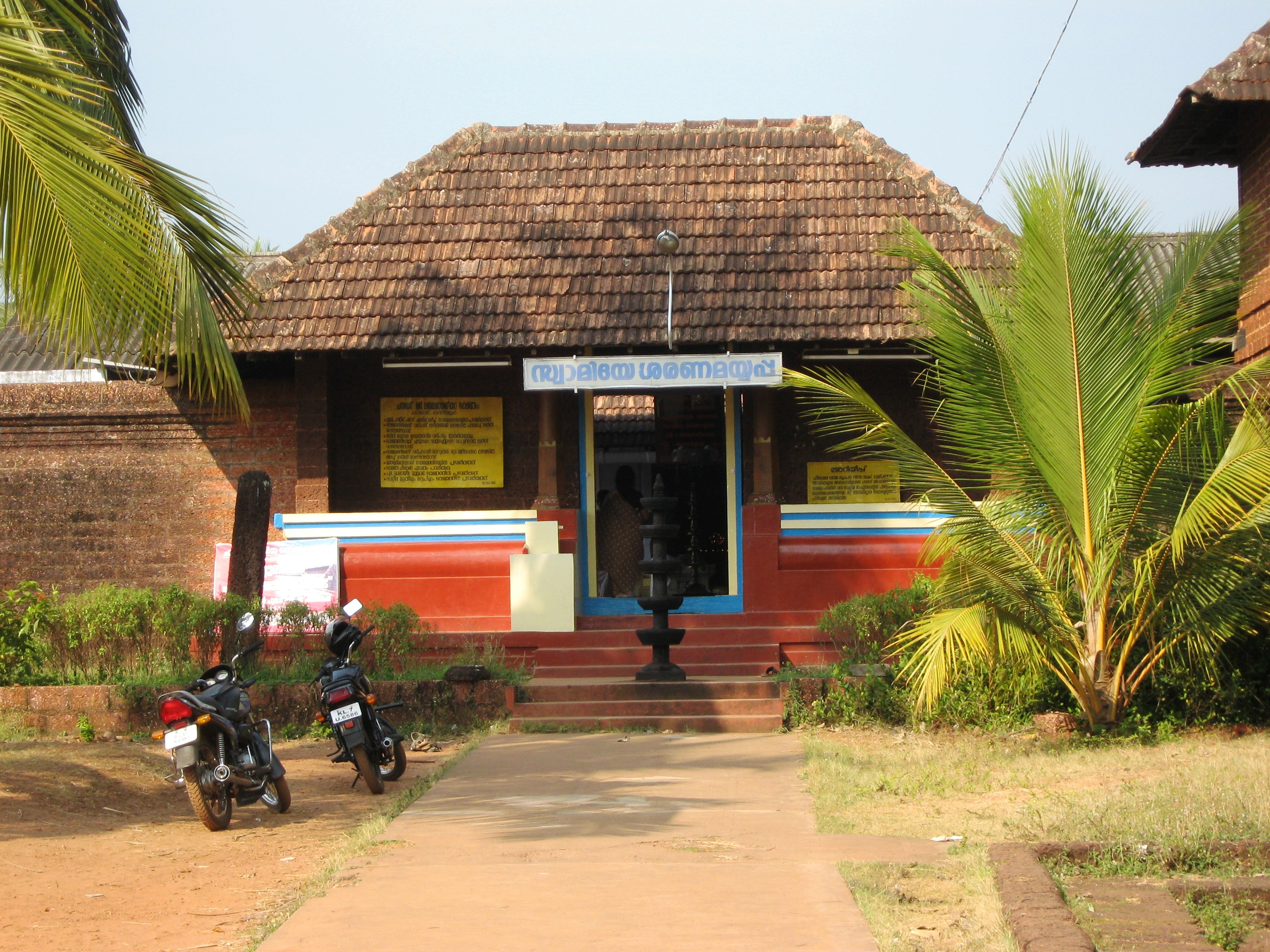
Ayyappa Temple, Chalad

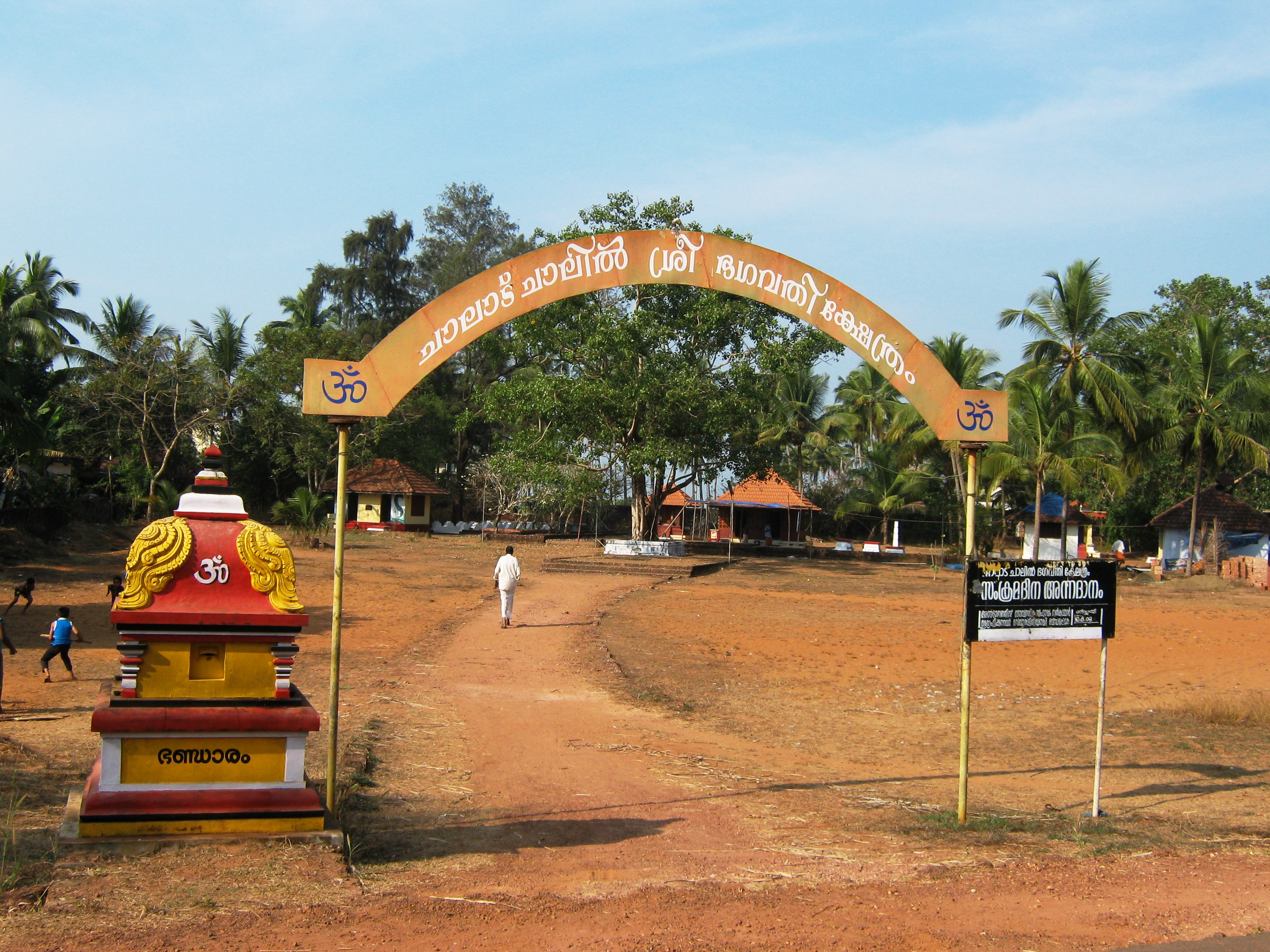
Chalad Chalil Temple

== See also ==
- Kannur district
- Pallikkunnu
- Payyambalam
- Azhikode
