= Chirakkal =

Chirakkal may refer to the following places in India:

- Chirakkal, Kannur, Kerala
  - Chirakkal railway station
- Chirakkal, Thrissur, Kerala
- Kolathunadu, Chirakkal in later times, a kingdom on the Malabar Coast during the arrival of the Portuguese Armadas in India

== See also ==
- Chirakkal Raja ('King of Chirakkal'), in modern-day Kerala
- Chirakkal Kovilakam, a branch of the Kodungallur Kovilakam royal family
- Urumi (film), about the Chirakkal royal family
