= Azhikodan Raghavan =

Indian Communist politician

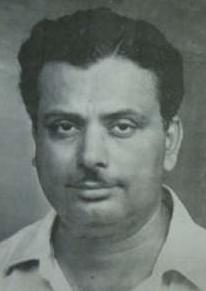
- Azhikodan Raghavan

Personal details
- Born: 1 July 1919 South Bazar, Kannur
- Died: 1972 (aged 52–53)
- Party: Communist Party of India (Marxist)
- Spouse: Meenakshi
- Parents: Kuruvan; Prickachi

Azhikodan Raghavan was a leader of the Communist Party of India (Marxist) (CPI(M)).

== Personal life ==
He was born on 1 July 1919, in South Bazar, Kannur.

== Political life ==
In 1940, he was groomed into a true communist by comrades P. Krishna Pillai and N. C. Shekhar. He was chosen to be the secretary of the Kannur town branch committee in 1946. In June 1951, he was chosen to be the member of the Malabar Committee of the Communist party and re-elected to the post. By that time Azhikodan had left his mark in Kerala politics. He was the secretary of the co-ordination committee of the coalition ministry of 1967.

== Death ==
Com. Azhikodan was stabbed to death in 1972. It is believed that fake news spread in Thrissur may have led to the murder of Azhikodan. There are also allegations raised by Nawab Rajendran that K. Karunakaran had a role in the murder.

He was cremated in the public graveyard of Payyambalam beach, Kannur district, Kerala, where a column has been erected in his memory.

== See also ==
- A K Gopalan
- E K Nayanar
- E. K. Imbichi Bava
- List of assassinated Indian politicians
