= Kanakamala =

Village in India

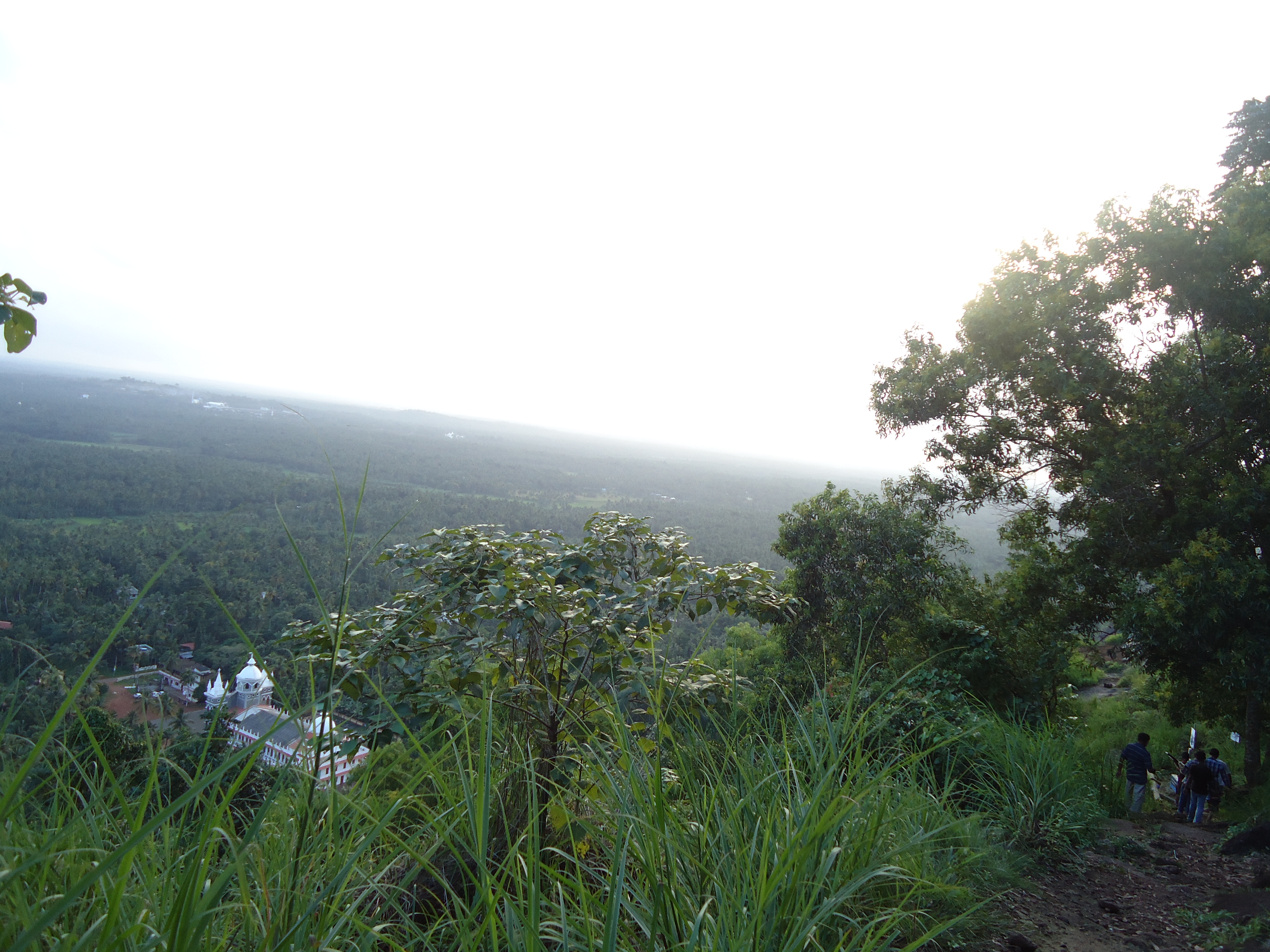
Church at the bottom as seen from Kanakamala hill

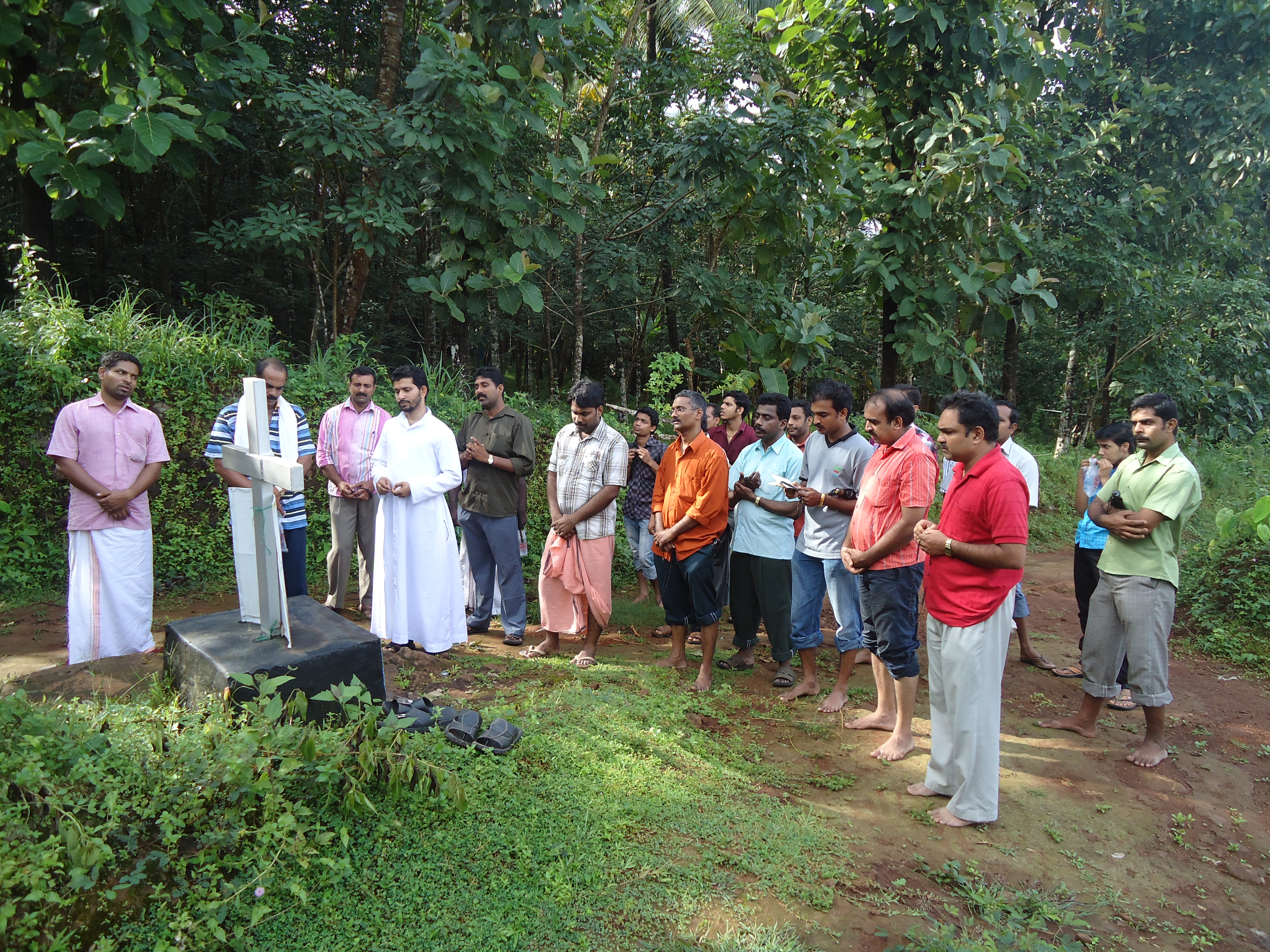
Pilgrims at 1st station of cross, start point to climb the hilltop shrine

Kanakamala is a village near Chalakudy town, Thrissur district, Kerala, India, which bears the same name as a hill in the area. It is located at an elevation of 1,000 feet above sea level. There are regular bus services from nearby towns, Chalakudy and Kodakara, to this village. The hill is on the western side of the Ghats (sahyadri).

There is a primary aided school which was established in 1940. It includes a government homeopathy hospital established in 1980's and was inaugurated by the then Chief Minister of Kerala. It has a post office pinned 680689.

There is an adoration convent, as well as an Ashram of Akasaparavakal which is a charitable institution aimed at treating orphans.

There is a Roman Catholic church in Kanamala, established in 1943 and dedicated to St Anthony of Padua. It is a place of pilgrimage during the holy week, particularly on Good Friday. Many pilgrims used to climb the hill as an act of prayer and offering. Most of the hill is covered with forest. Pilgrimage to the hill which has been patronized to St. Thomas the apostle of Jesus came to India in AD 52 was started in 1940 following an insight and vision happened in dream to Rev. Fr. Anthappan Valiyaveettil, the then-vicar of St. Antony's Church, Perambra. He started the pilgrimage to the hill as he thought that it was the place that he had seen in his dream, and believed that it had significant spiritual importance, since St. Thomas would have gone through the hill as it is the nearest hill to Azhikode where the apostle was banked off the ship and praying at hills was a characteristic of Jesus and his disciples. 2014 marked 75 years of pilgrimage (the platinum jubilee.)

As of October 2013 the diocesan website states that the population of the parish of Kanamala is 2250.

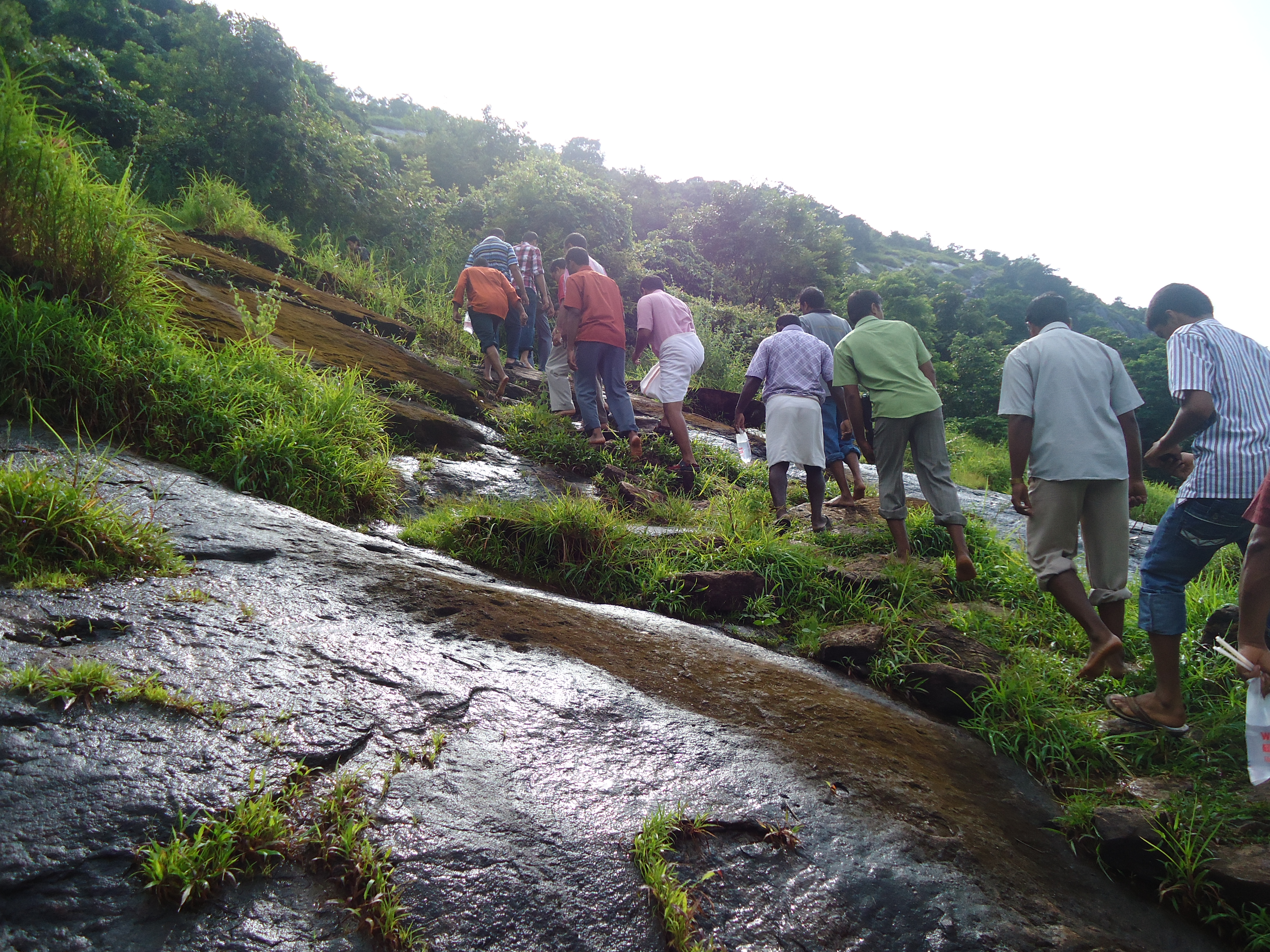
Pilgrims climbing the hill to reach the shrine
