= Chirakkal, Thrissur =

Chirakkal
- Town
- Location in Kerala, India Chirakkal (India)
- Coordinates: 10.411360°N 76.172891°E
- Country: India
- State: Kerala
- District: Thrissur
- Named for: Chira(River)

Government
  - Type: Democracy
  - Body: Panchayath

Languages
  - Official: Malayalam, English
- Time zone: UTC+5:30 (IST)
- Postal code: 680 564
- ISO 3166 code: IN-KL
- Vehicle registration: KL-08

Chirakkal is a small village in Thrissur district of Kerala, South India. It is fifteen kilometers from Thrissur city, on the Cherpu-Thriprayar road.

Chirakkal is in the bank of Karuvannur River. The major area of Chirakkal is covered with paddy and coconut fields. Chirakkal has got three Major Hindu temples, Shiva (Vendrasseri Shiva Kshethram CBE), Devi (Thiruvanikkavu Amma) and Krishna (Kurumpilavu Shree Krishna Kshethram CBE) and several other family-owned temples, one Christian church named St Antony Church, Chirakkal and one mosque. Chirakkal has one LP government school and one management UP and high school in the name of Bhodhananda Swami, the first disciple of Sree Narayana Guru.
