= Kannur Beach =

Group of beaches in Kannur, Kerala, India

Coordinates: 11.871°N 75.351°E

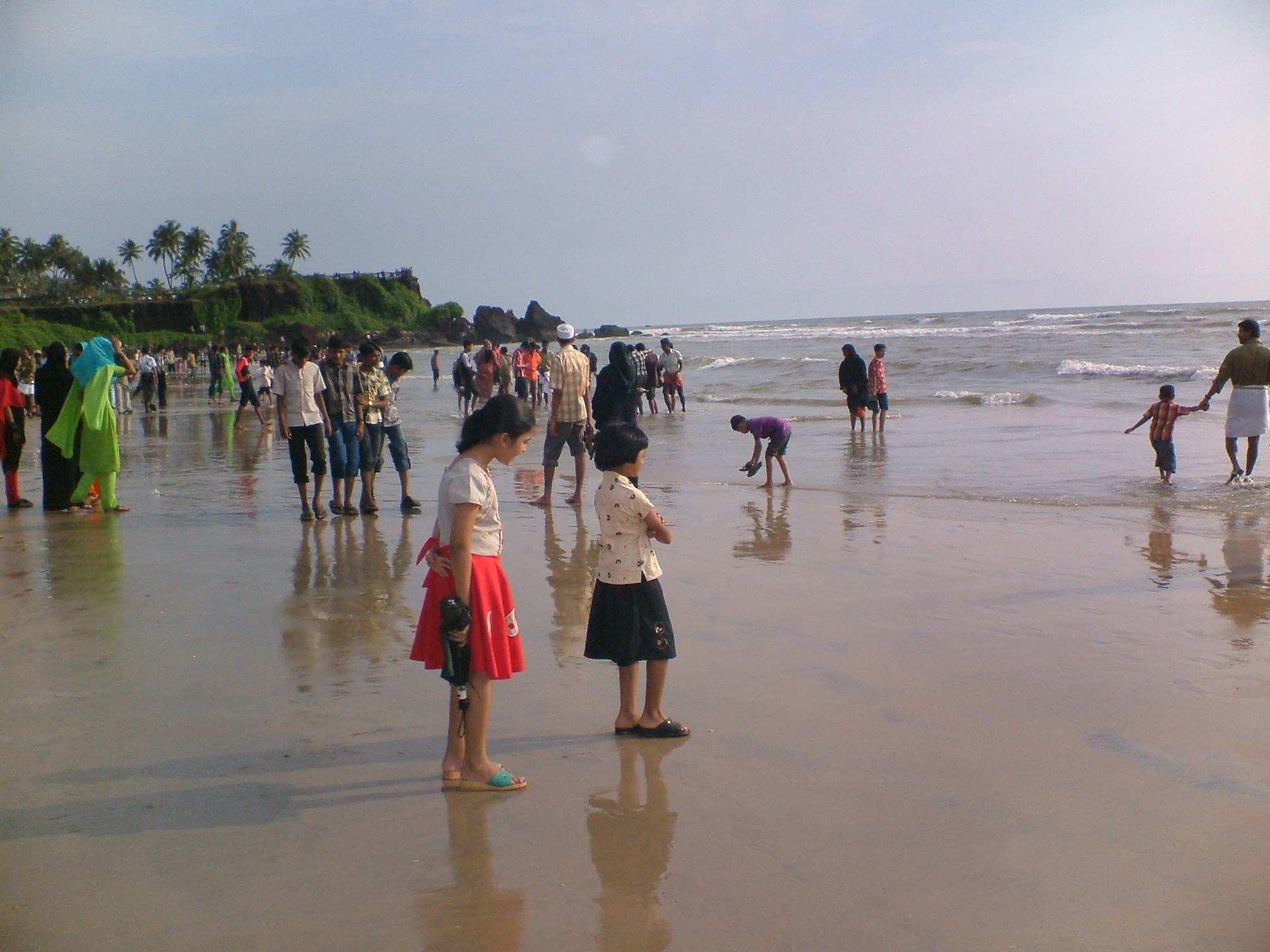
People at Payyambalam Beach

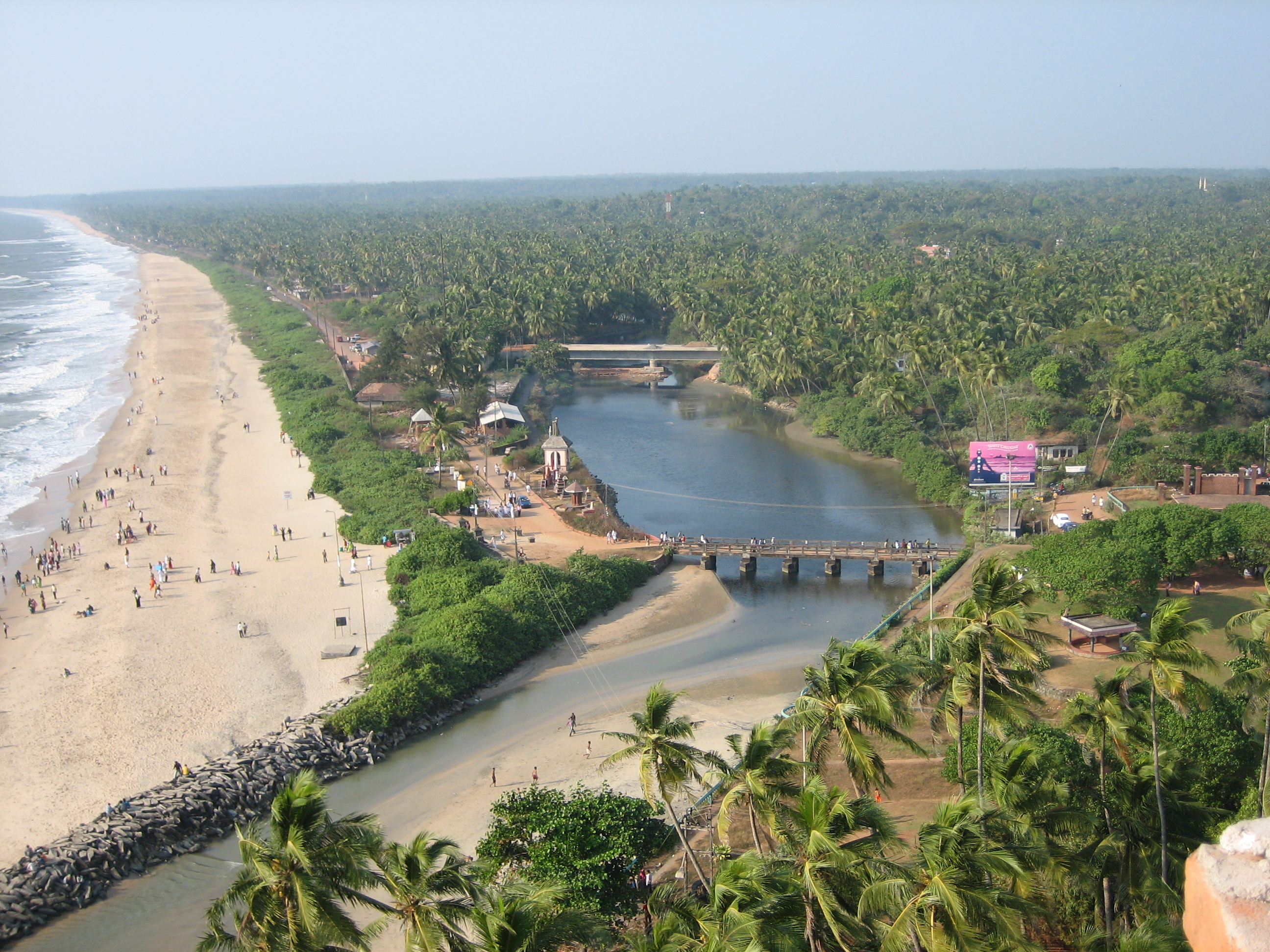
Payyambalam Beach - Joining with Padana Thodu

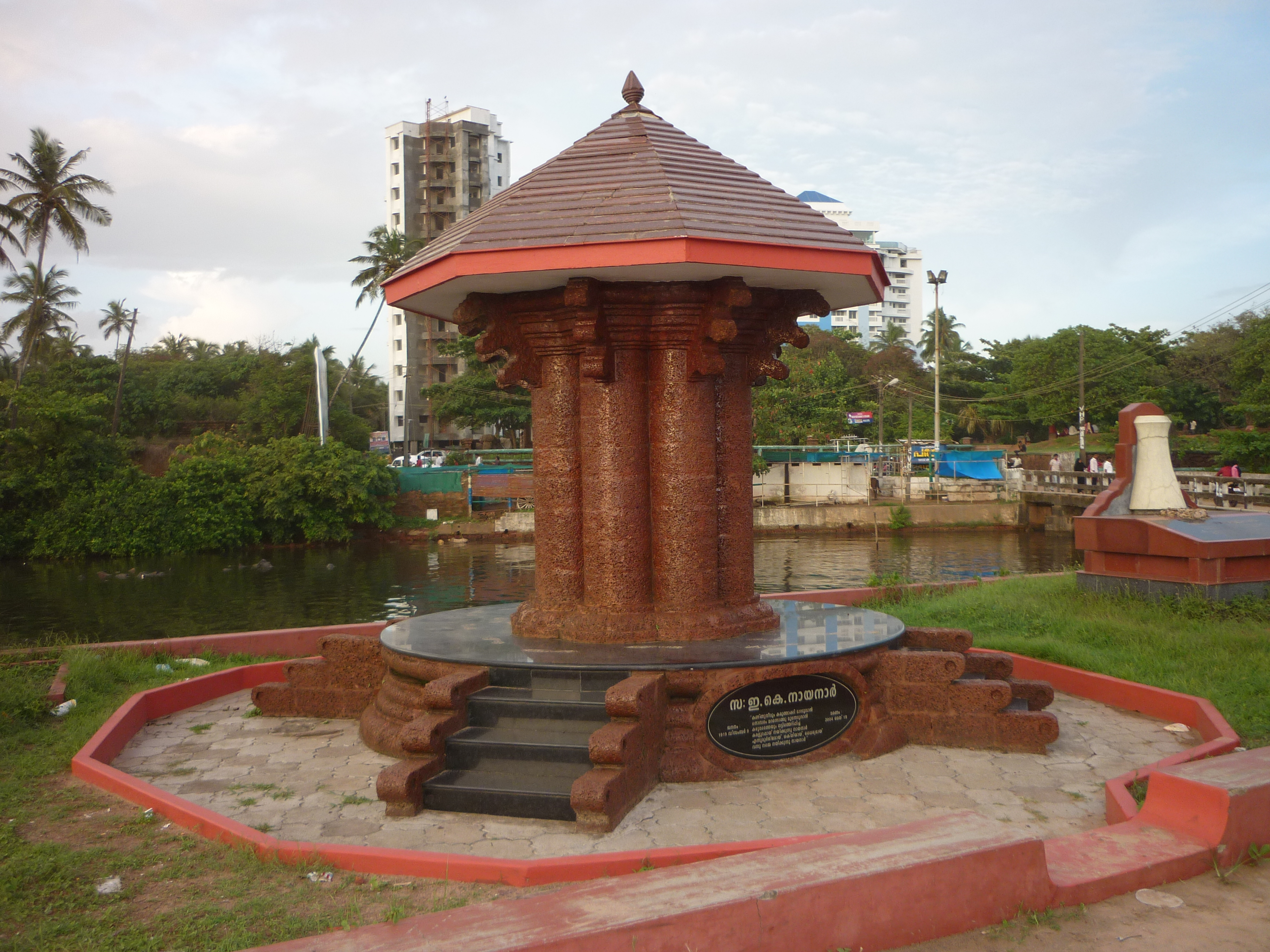
The grave of former chief minister E.K.Nayanar

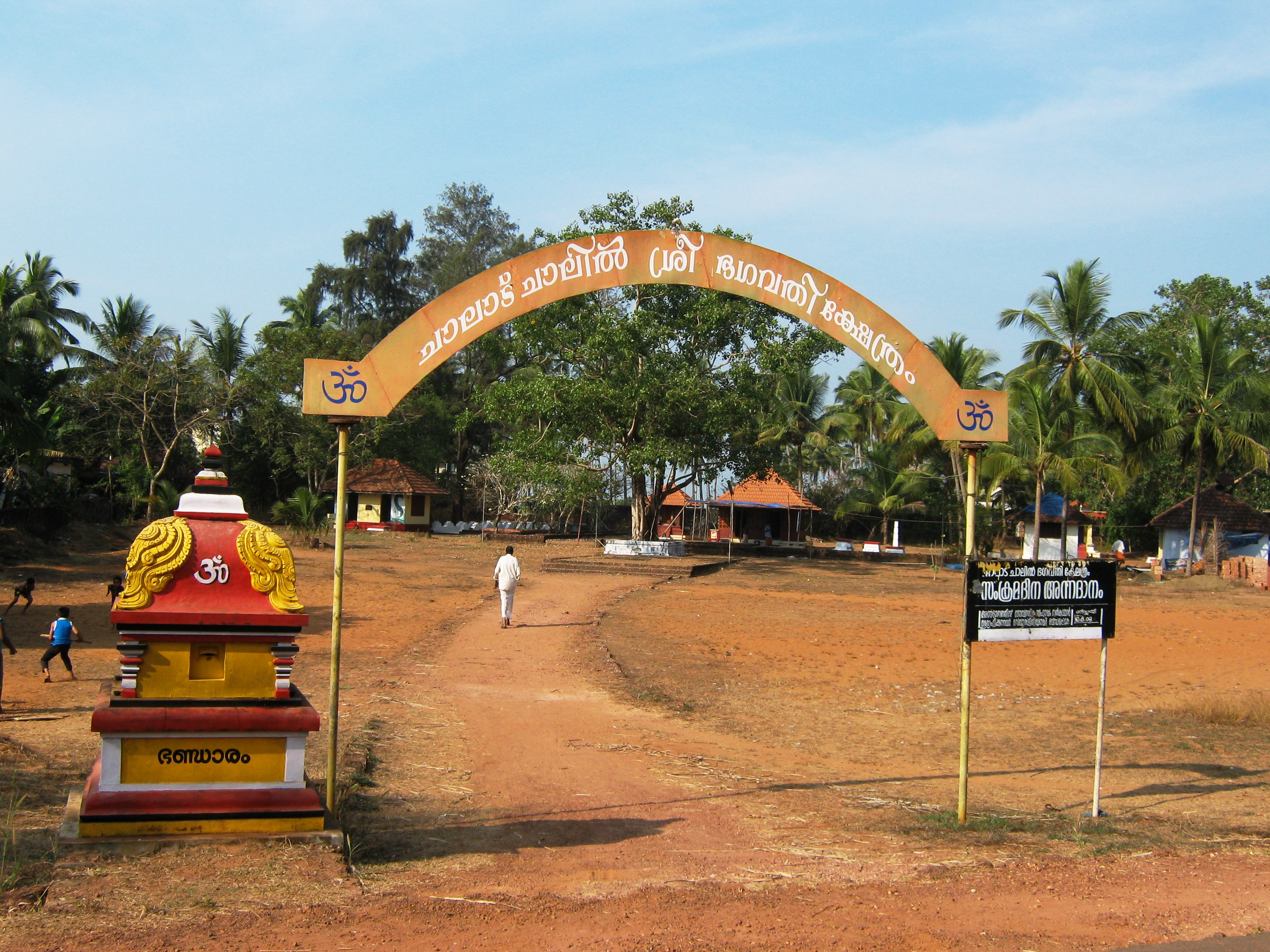
Chalad Chalil Bhagavathy Temple

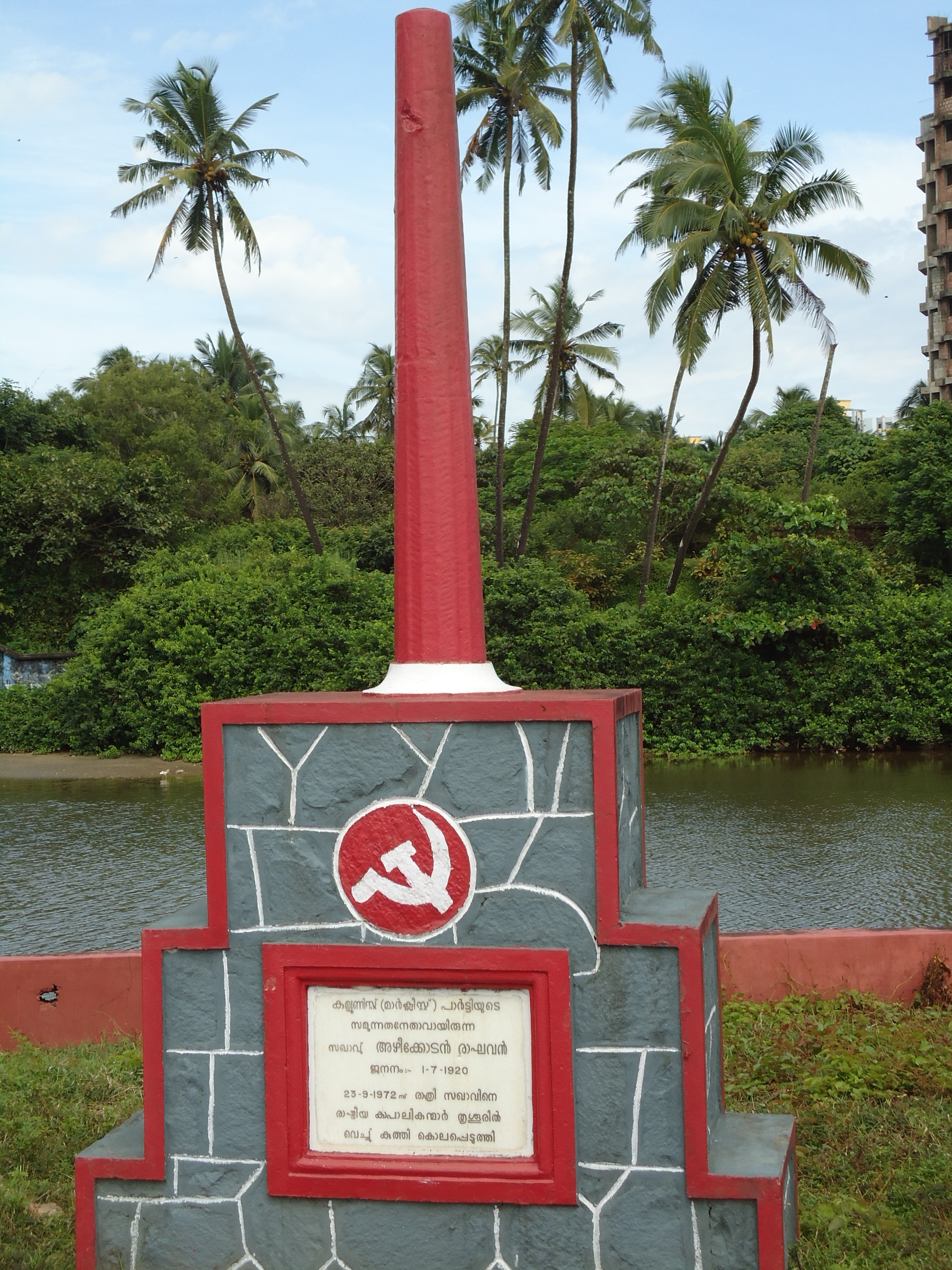
The grave of Azhikodan Raghavan, social worker from Kannur

Kannur Beach is a group of five beaches on the western side of Kannur city in Kerala, India. They are:

1. Payyambalam Beach
2. Meenkunnu Beach
3. Adikadalayi Beach
4. Baby Beach
5. Thayyil Beach

== Overview ==
A sculpture Amma (Thai) by Kanayi Kunhiraman is an attractive feature of the beach garden. A part of the garden is specially for children. Many movies have been shot in this location including the Maniratnam movie Alai Payuthey. The Worldspace ad featuring A.R. Rahman was also shot here.

== Graves of Important People ==
Kannur beach is popular for the graves of some of the most prominent social leaders of Kerala. Leadaers like former Chief Minister of Kerala E. K. Nayanar, Swadeshabhimani Ramakrishna Pillai, A. K. Gopalan, Pamban Madhavan, Sukumar Azhikode and K. G. Marar are laid to rest near this beach.

== Muzhappilangad Drive-in Beach ==
Muzhappilangad Beach is popular for driving because of its hard surface. There is continuous stretch of five kilometers suitable for driving cars and motorbikes. The beach is located on the national highway to Thalassery. This is the longest drive-in beach in India.

== Thottada Beach ==
Thottada Beach is a beautiful beach some 2 km south of Kannur. This beach is 800 meters long and many tourists come here for sunbathing. The Thottada river flows into the beach.

== Meenkunnu Beach ==
Meenkunnu Beach is on the road to Azhikode. This beach is popular among Europeans because of its picture-postcard-looks. There are no facilities on the beach for tourists. It is the favorite of the click happy tourist.

== St. Angelo Fort ==
St. Angelo Fort (or Kannur Fort) is located about 3 km south of Kannur city. This fort was built in 1505 by the Portuguese. The Dutch captured the fort in 1663 and modernized it. In 2015, thousands of abandoned cannonballs were discovered from the fort during an excavation.

== Mappila Bay ==
The Mappila Bay Harbour and the Arakkal Museum are near the city. There are many beautiful mosques in this area.

== See also ==
- Meenkunnu Beach
- Muzhappilangad Beach
- Dharmadam Island
- Thottada Beach
- St. Angelo Fort

== Gallery ==
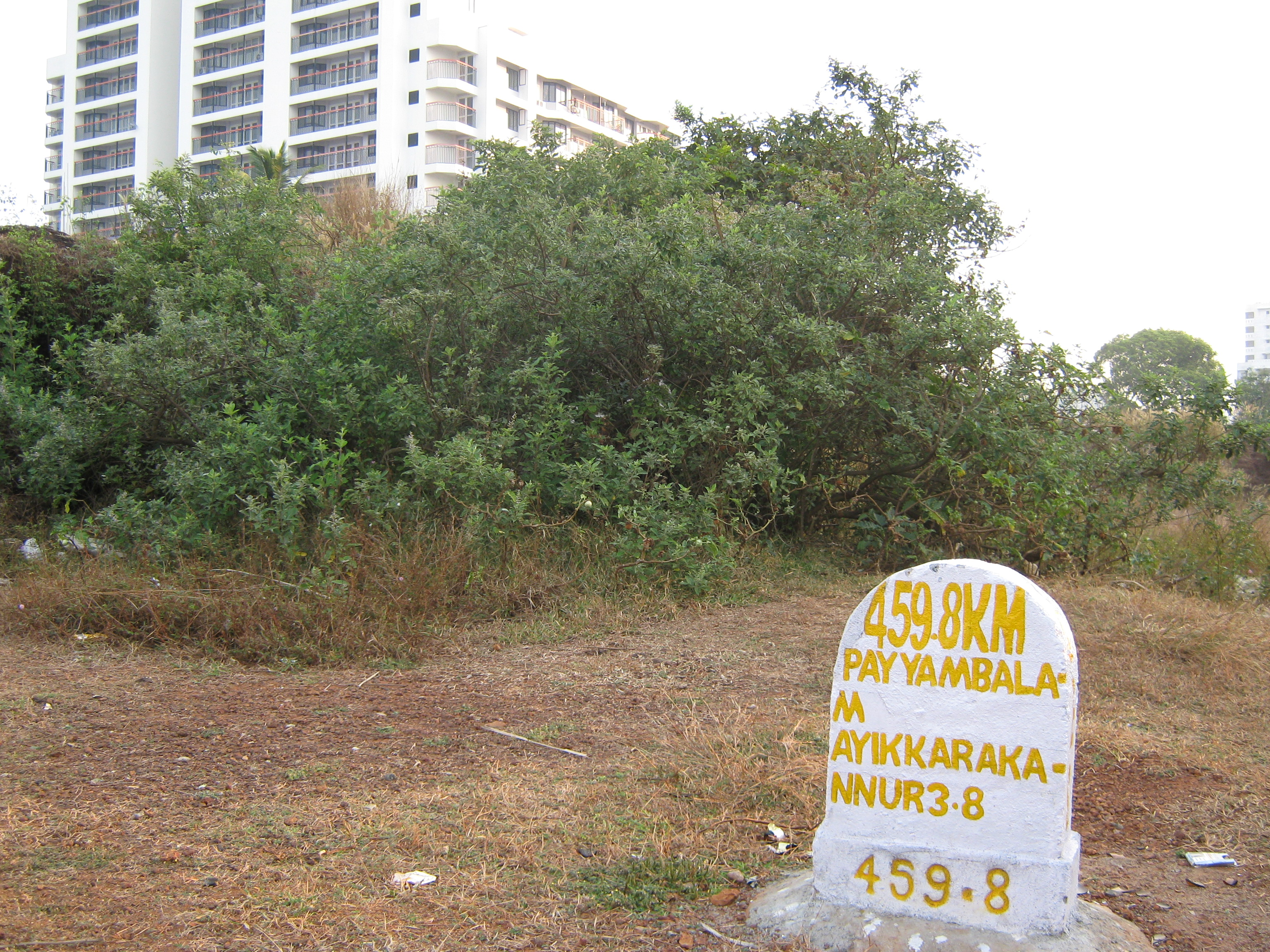
Payyambalam

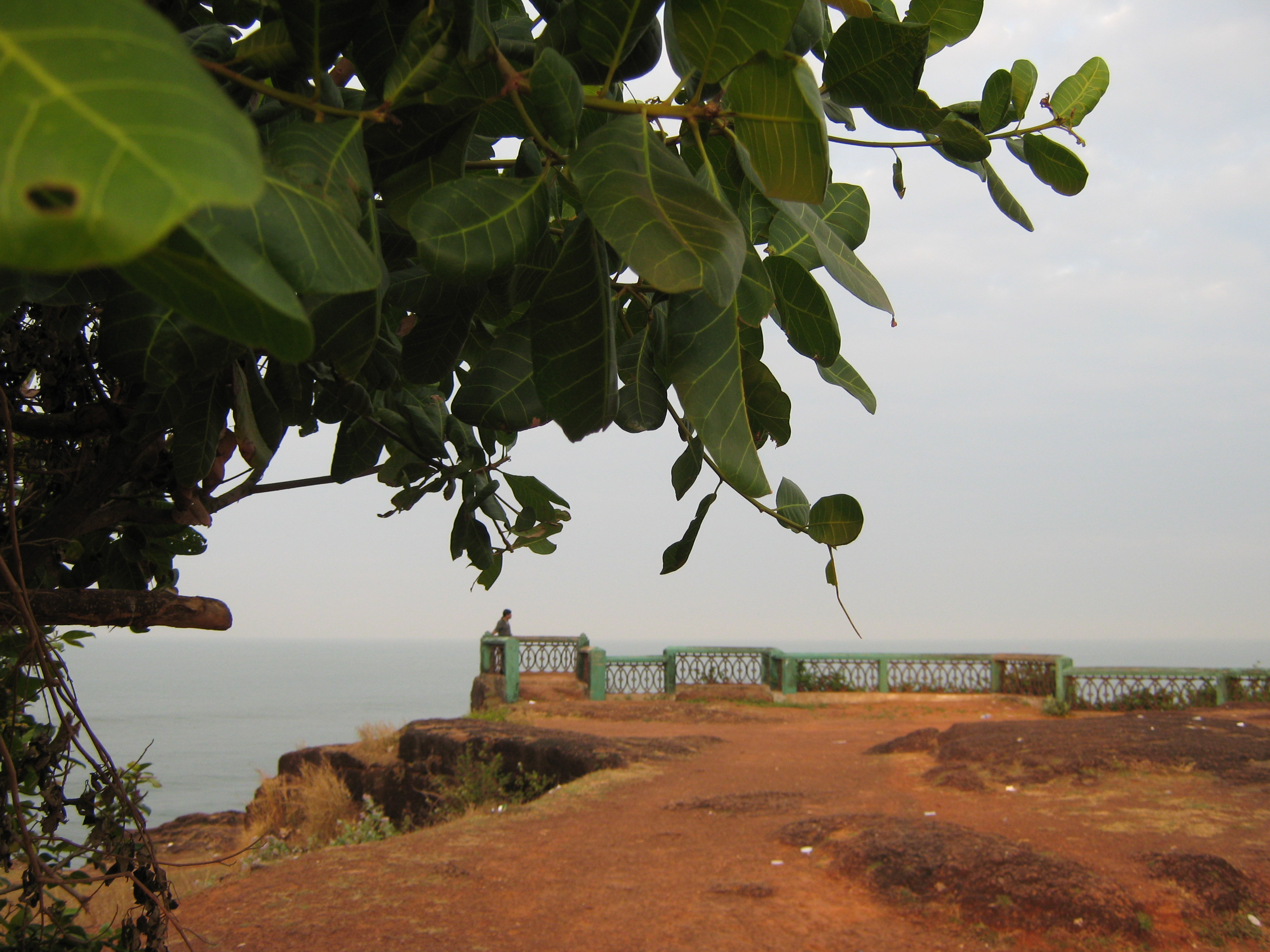
The cliff at Payyambalam

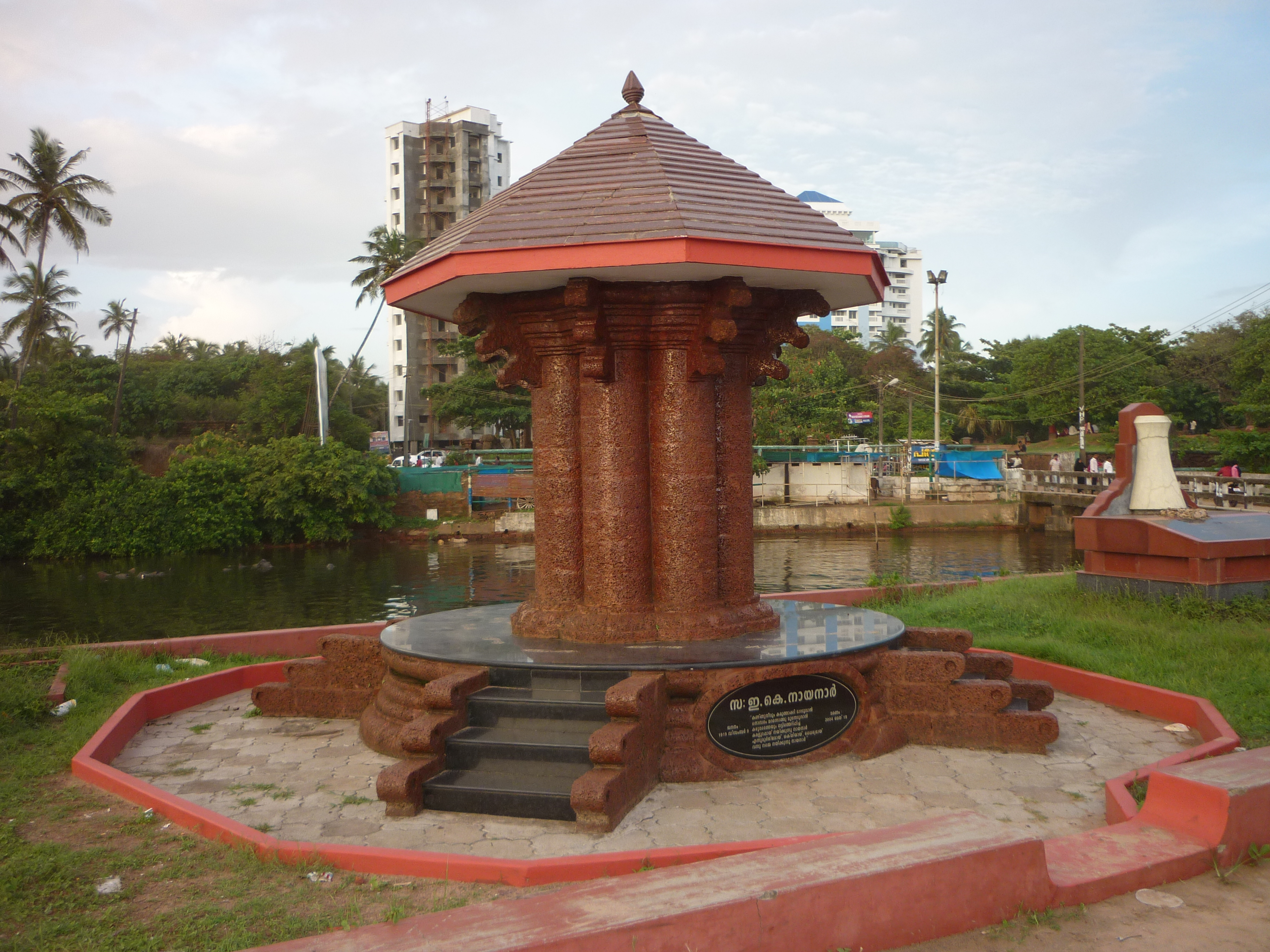
E.K.Nayanar Samadhi

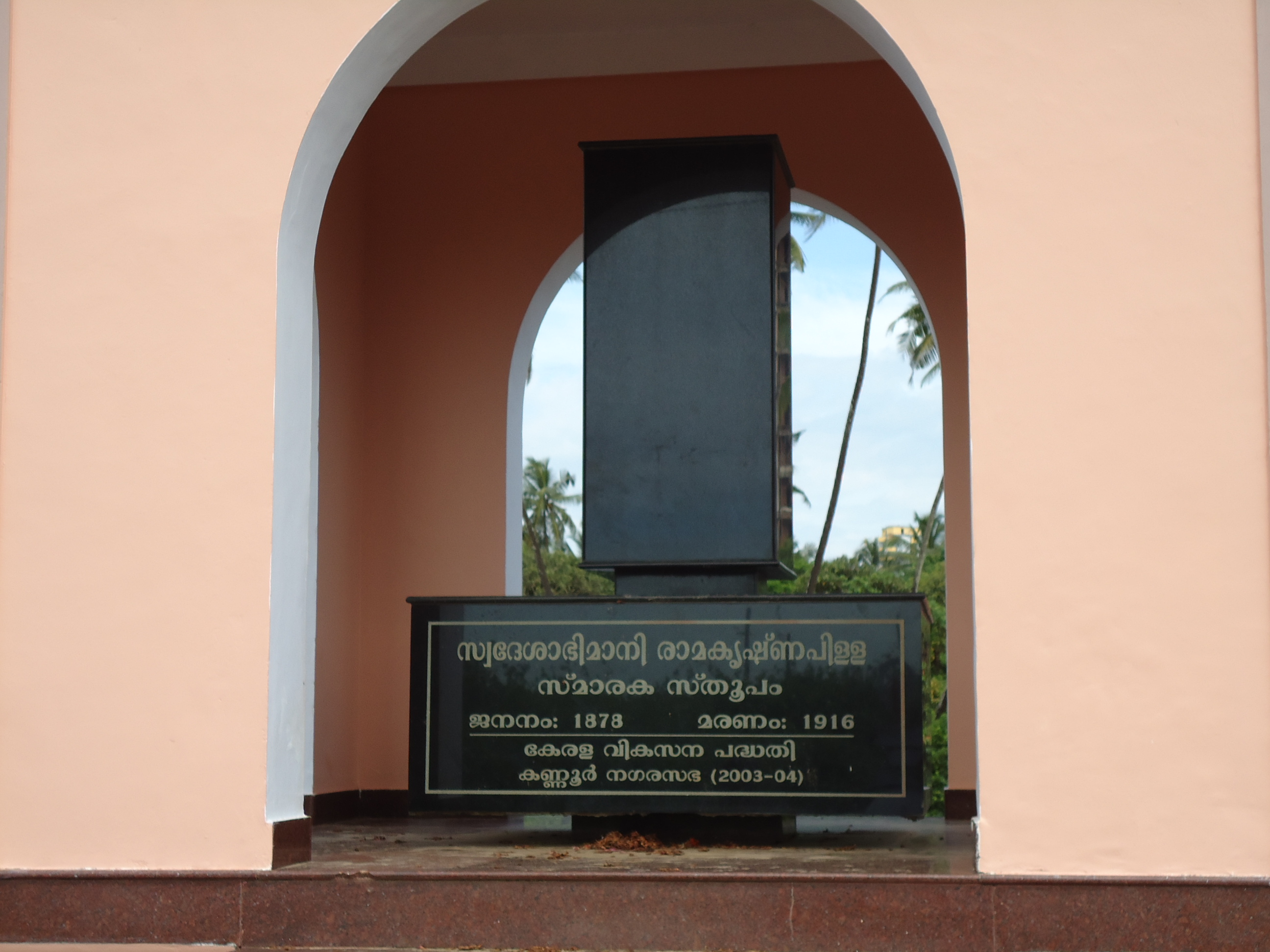
Swadeshabhimani Ramakrishna Pillai Samadhi

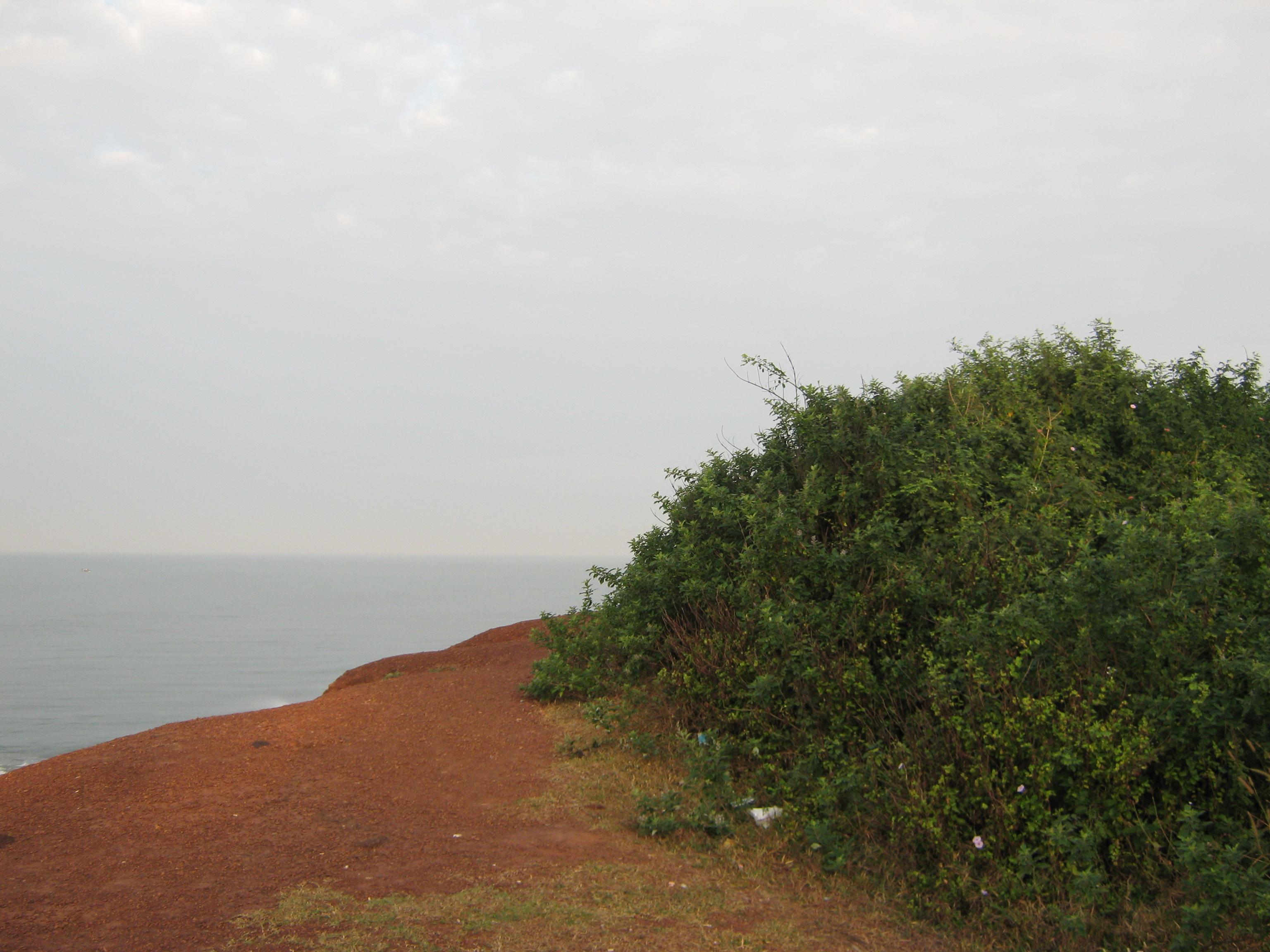
A view of the beach

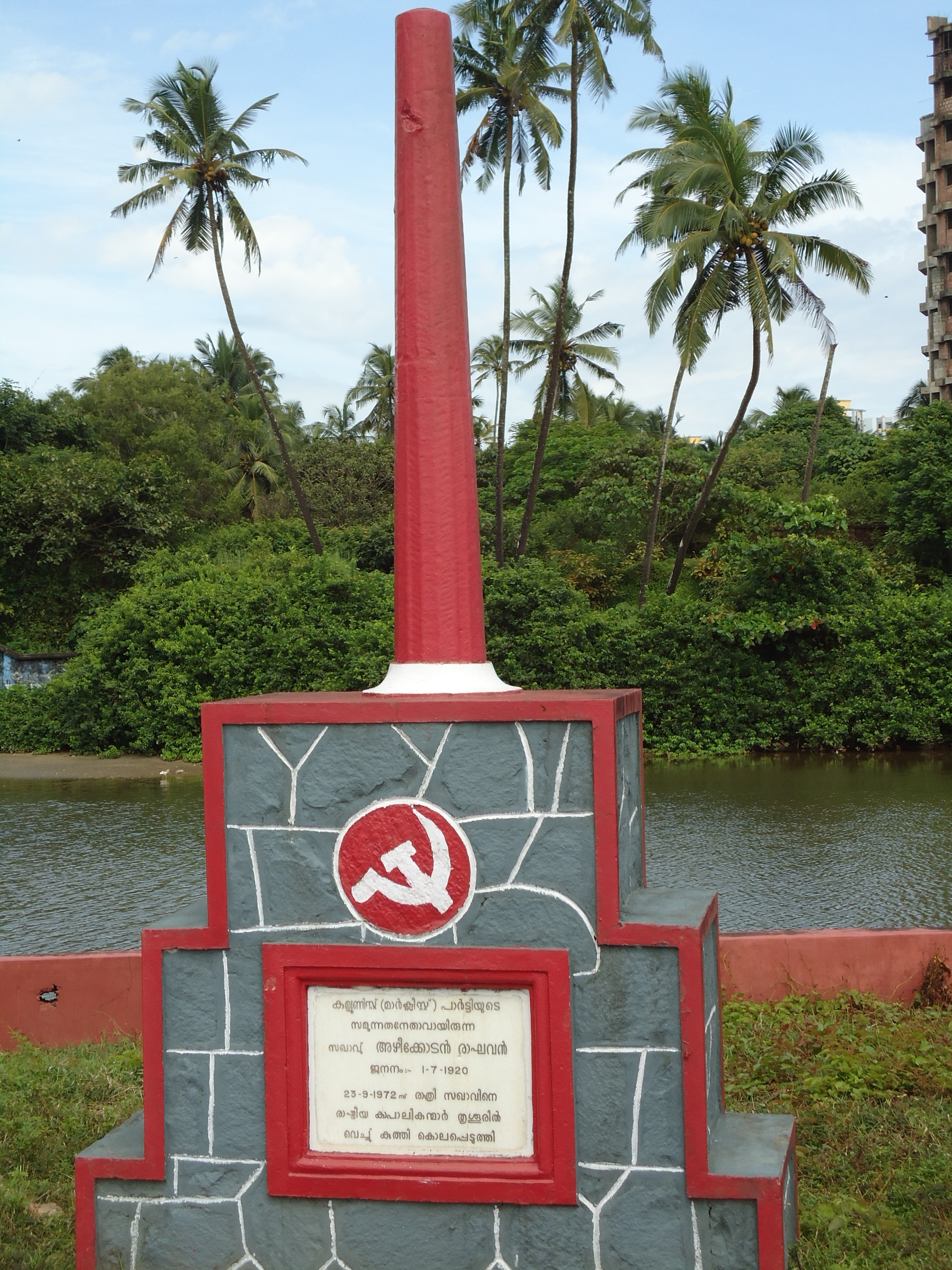
Azhikkodan Raghavan Samadhi

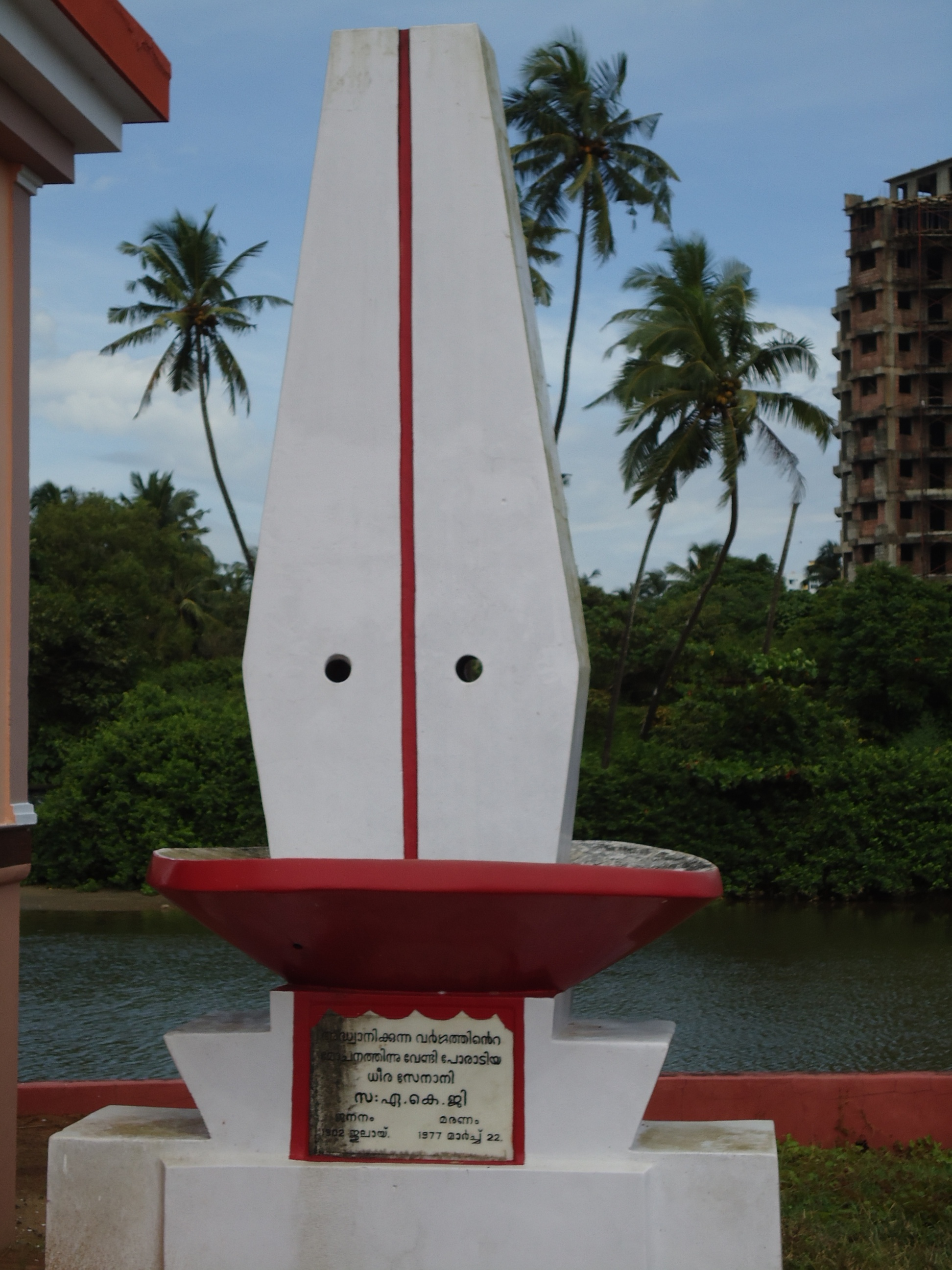
A.K.G.Samadhi

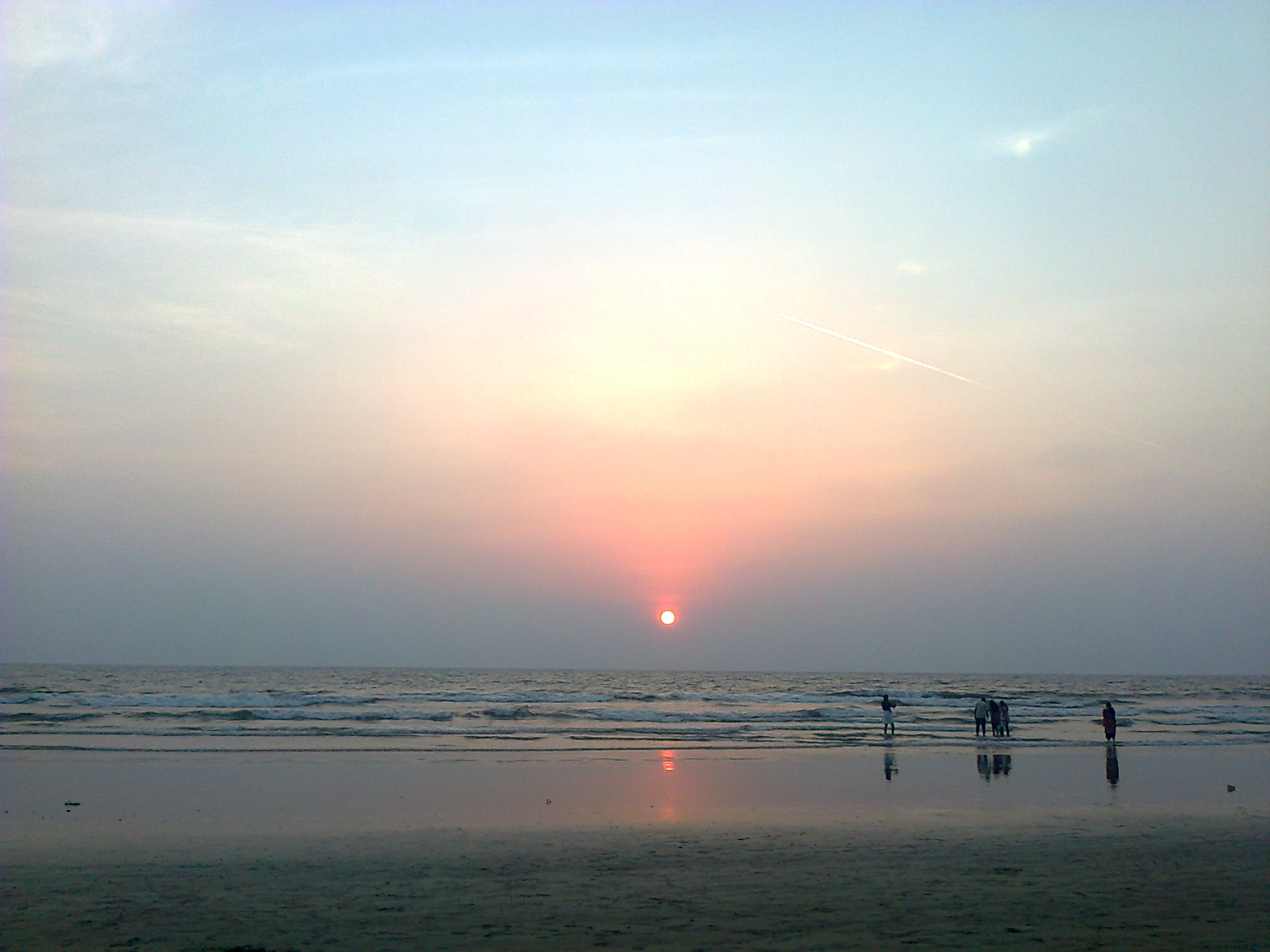
Payyambalam Beach Sunset

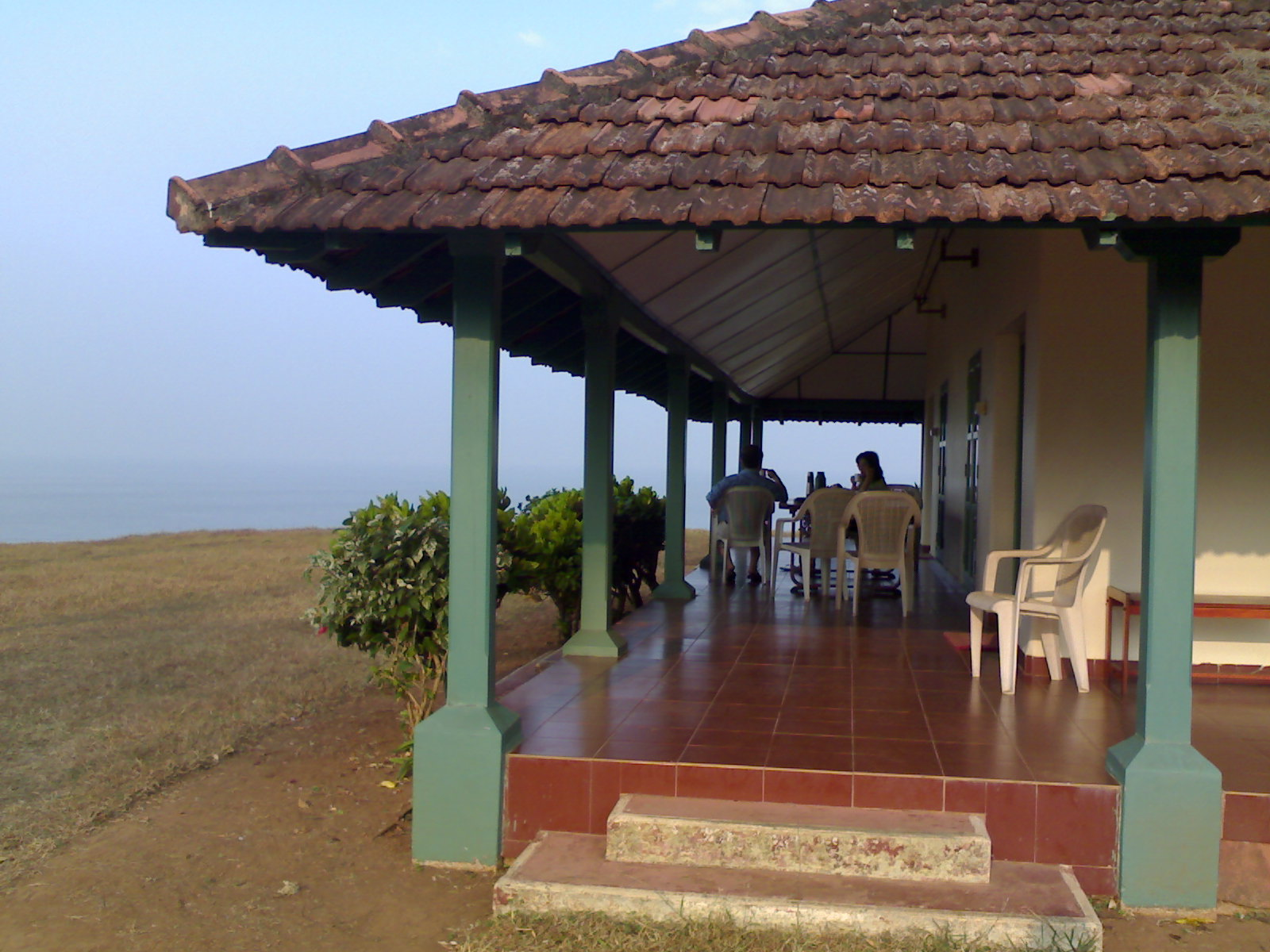
The Guest House of Western India Plywoods at Payyambalam Beach

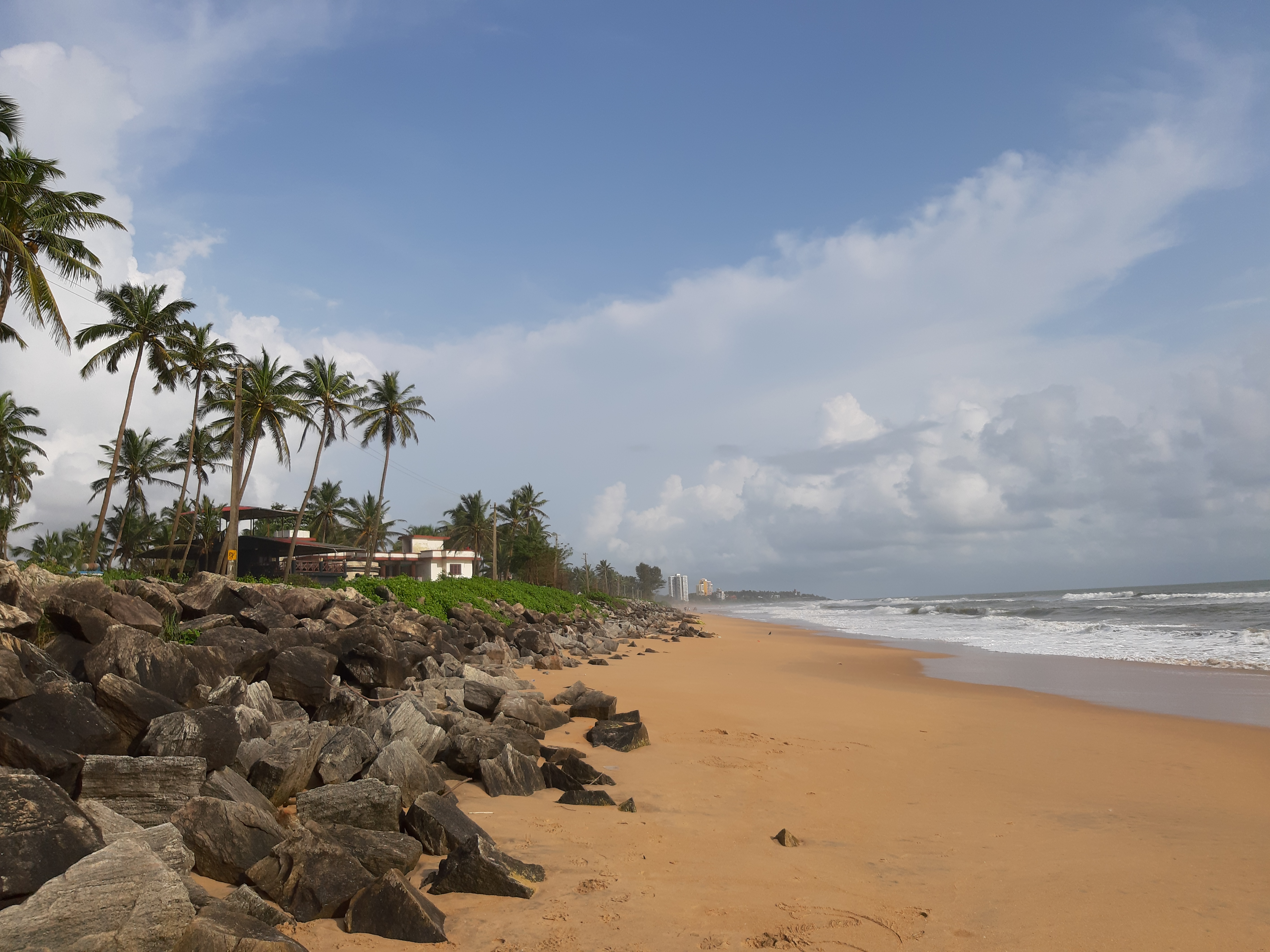
A view of Payyambalam Beach
