= Azhikode and Azhikkal =

Town in Kerala, India

Azhikode
- Census Town/Suburb
- Interactive map of Azhikode
- Coordinates: 11°55′13″N 75°20′10″E
- Country: India
- State: Kerala
- District: Kannur

Government
  - Type: Panchayat raj
  - Body: Azhikode Panchayat

Area
  - Total: 15.98 km^{2} (6.17 sq mi)

Population (2011)
  - Total: 47,323
  - Density: 2,961/km^{2} (7,670/sq mi)

Languages
  - Official: Malayalam, English
- Time zone: UTC+5:30 (IST)
- PIN: 670009
- ISO 3166 code: IN-KL
- Vehicle registration: KL-13
- Nearest city: Kannur

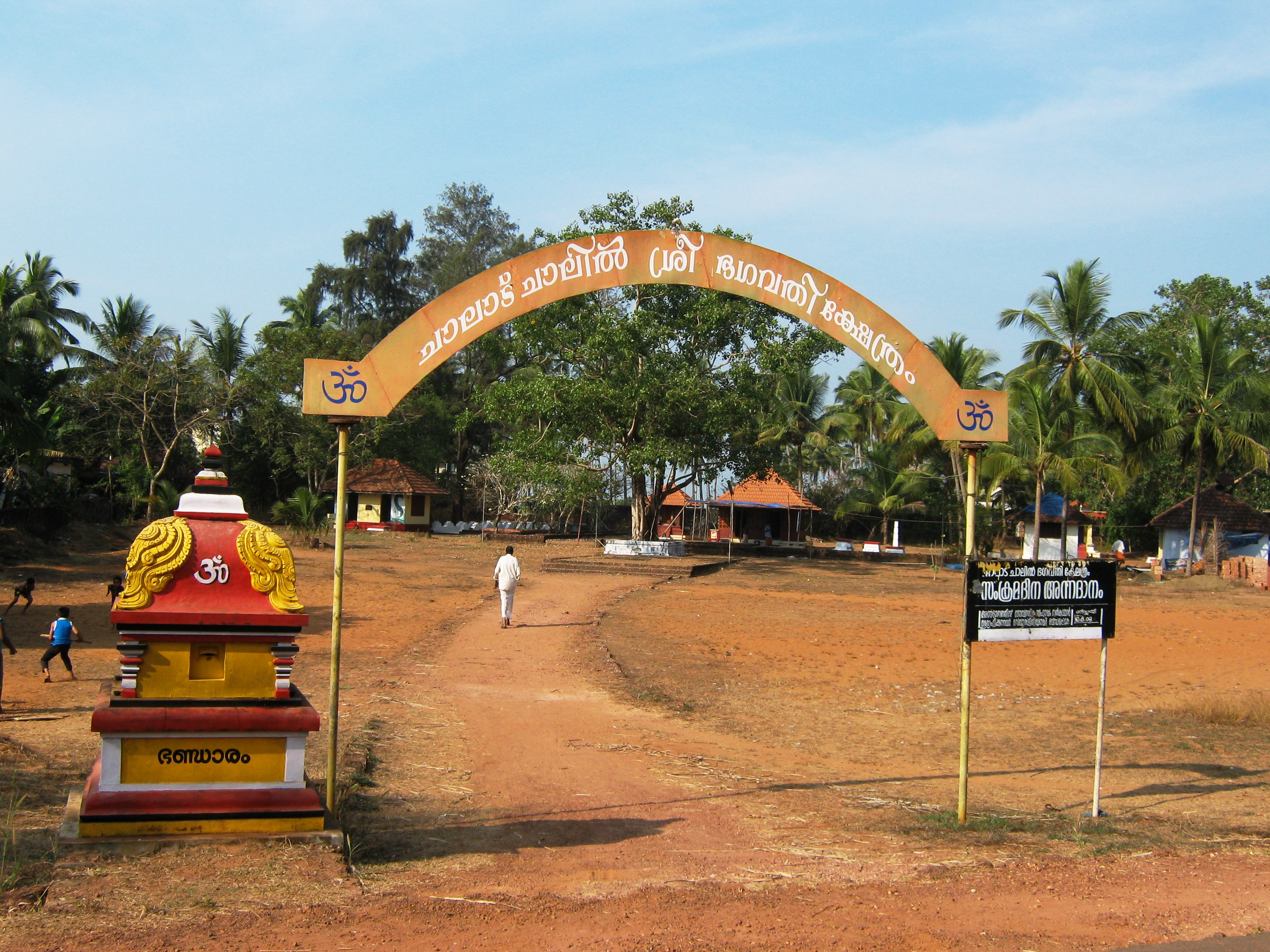
Chalad Chalil Bhagavathi Temple

Azhikode is a census town and suburb of Kannur city in Kannur district of Kerala, India. Azhikode town is divided into Azhikode North and Azhikode South. The northern end of the Azhikode North is called Azhikkal. The place is the birthplace of Sukumar Azhikode, an influential thinker and literary critic. It is located about 7.5 km (4.7 mi) from Kannur city.

== Demographics ==
As of 2011 India Census, Azhikode north census town had population of 22,128 which constitutes 10,157 males and 11,971 females. Azhikode north has an area of 8.54 km^{2} (3.30 sq mi) with 4,503 families residing in it. Azhikode south census town had population of 25,195 where 11,369 are males and 13,826 are females. Azhikode south has an area of 7.44 km^{2} (2.87 sq mi) with 5,512 households.

Azhikode panchayat consists of Azhikode north and Azhikode south census towns. Azhikode Panchayat had total population of 47,323 which constitutes 21,526 males and 25,797 females. The male female sex ratio was 1198 higher than state average of 1084. Population in the age group 0-6 was 4,948 (10.45%). Azhikode panchayat had overall literacy of 97%, higher than state average of 94%. Male literacy stands at 98.4% and female literacy was 96%.

Social composition in Azhikode (2011)
Community	Percent
Thiyyar	45.4%
Other Hindu	27.97%
Islam	26.67%
Christianity	0.85%

== Beaches in Azhikode ==
Azhikode is famous for its beaches like

- Meenkunnu beach (Fish hill)
- Chalil Beach and Gardens (Chal beach)
- Azhikkal Estuary
- Neerkadavu Beach

== As a suburb of Kannur city ==
Kannur city is connected to Azhikode and Azhikkal from Payyambalam beach through Palliyamoola beach, Chal beach, Azhikode South, Meenkunnu Beach, Azhikode North and finally Azhikkal. Villages like Alavil, Manal, Chalad, Chirakkal, Puthiyatheru and Valapattanam are connected to Azhikode. There is a widespread demand to merge Azhikode, Valapattanam and Chirakkal panchayaths to Kannur Corporation.

The main areas of Azhikode North are Azhikkal, Chal beach and Kappakadavu and that of Azhikode South are Vankulathuvayal, Poothappara, Meenkunnu Beach, Neerkadavu Beach and Kappila peedika. Vankulathvayal is one of largest commercial centre in Azhikode.

Pin code of Azhikode is 670009

It is also the birthplace of famous personalities like Sukumar Azhikode, Shihabbuddin Poythumkadavu and Byju Raveendran. Azhikode has large number of temples and mosques and is well connected with roads. Valapattanam railway station is the nearest railway station. It is well connected to the Kannur City via roads. Steady flow of buses in all directions provide a fluent system of transport.

== Politics ==
Azhicode assembly constituency is part of Kannur (Lok Sabha constituency).

== Azhikkal ==
Azhikkal estuary is the northern end of Azhikode village, where Valapattanam River empties into Arabian Sea. The place has bus stand, a small river port and a fishing harbour. It is the site for a proposed expanded cargo port. The Indian Coast Guard Academy is under construction at Irinave, near to Azhikkal.

== Image gallery ==
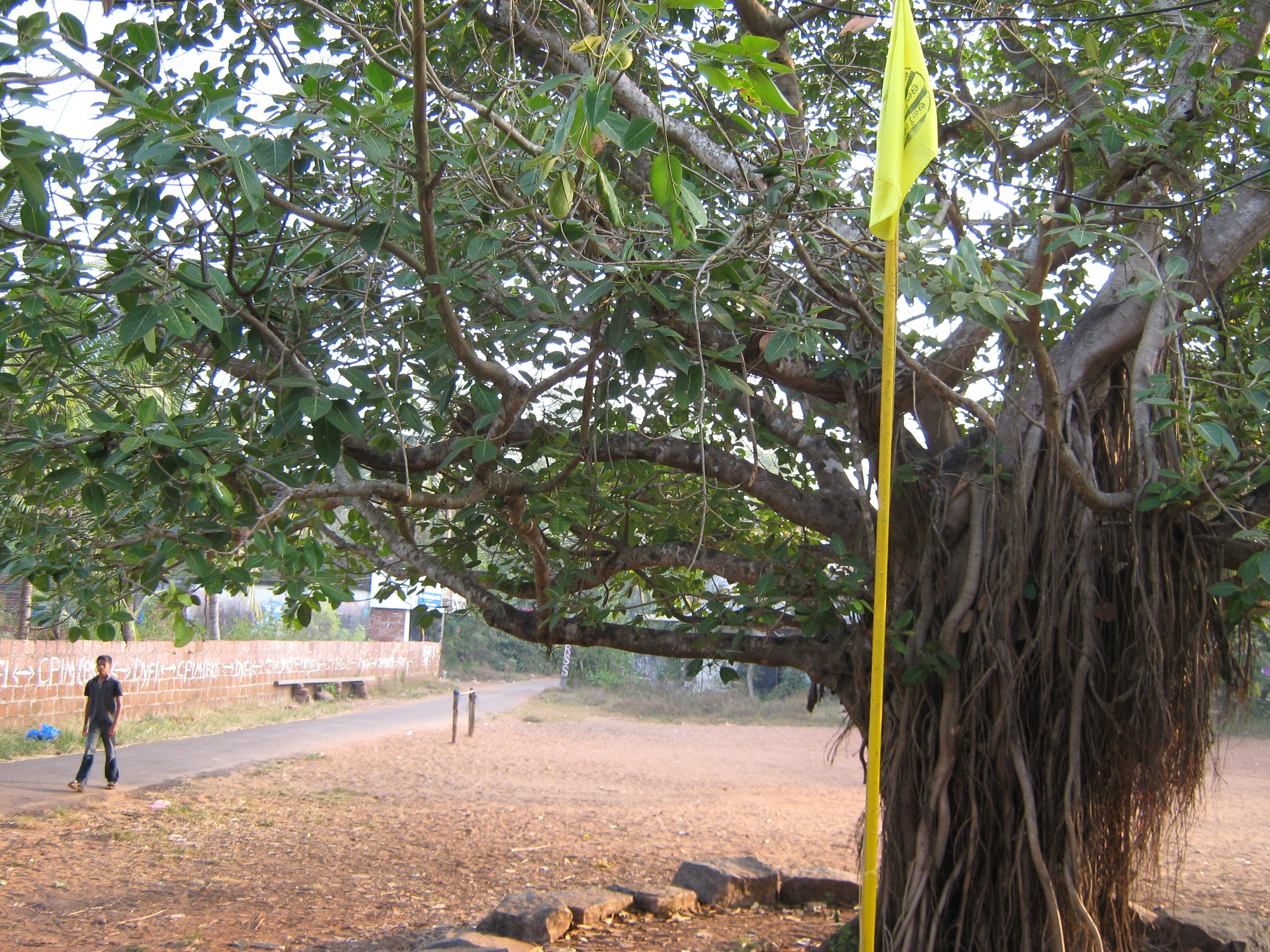
Chalode

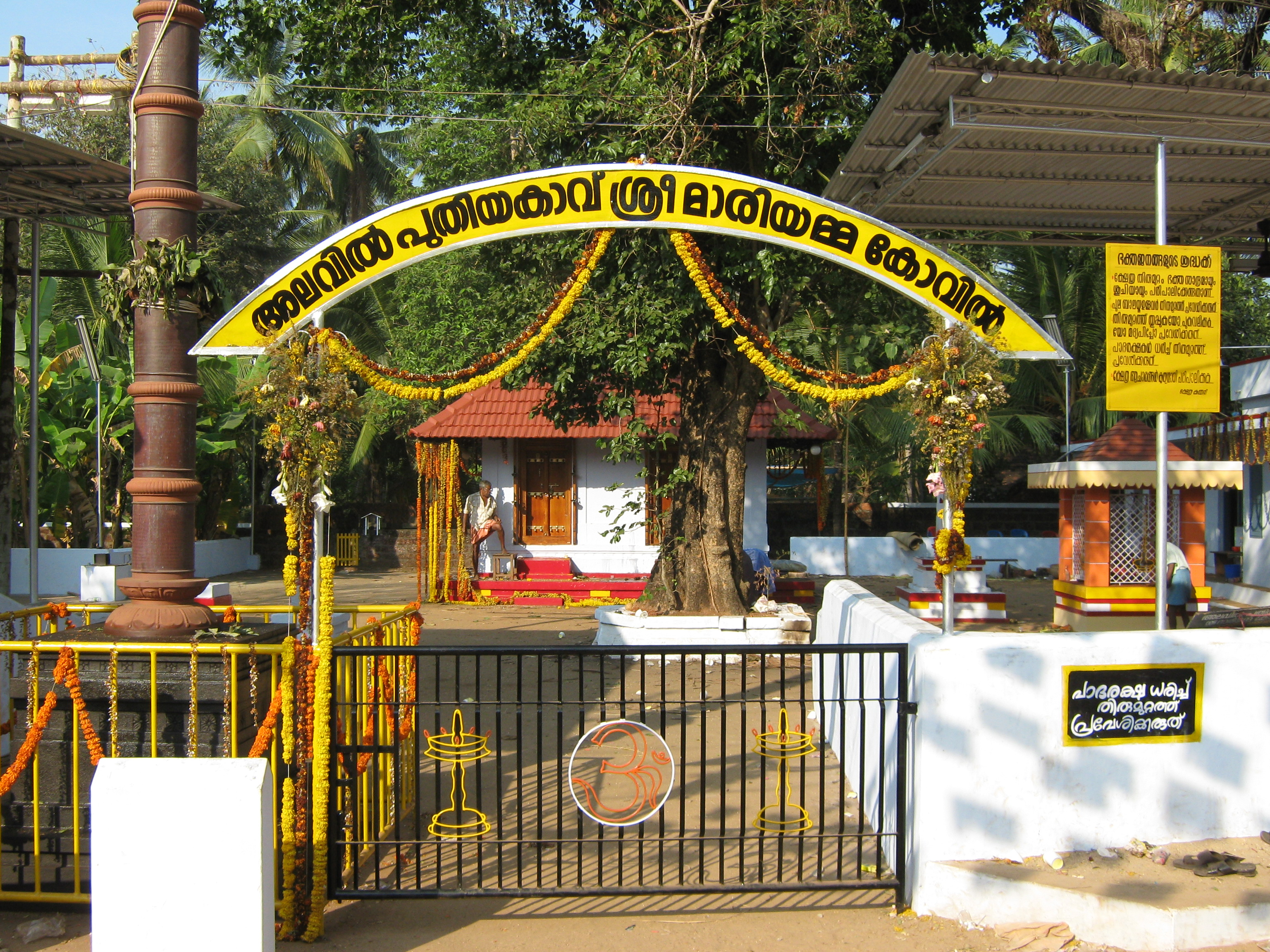
Alavil Puthiyakavu Mariamma Temple

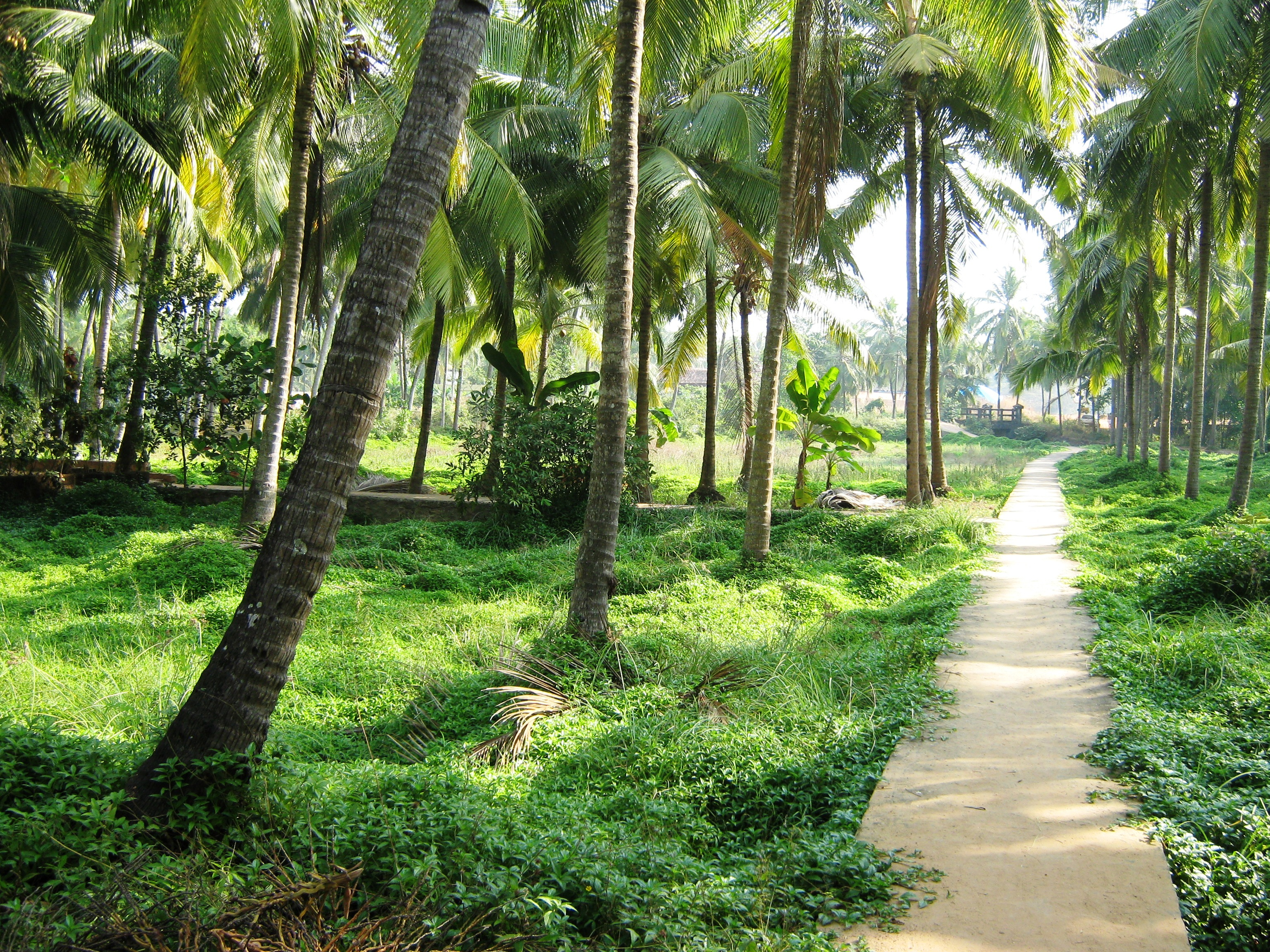
Azhikode

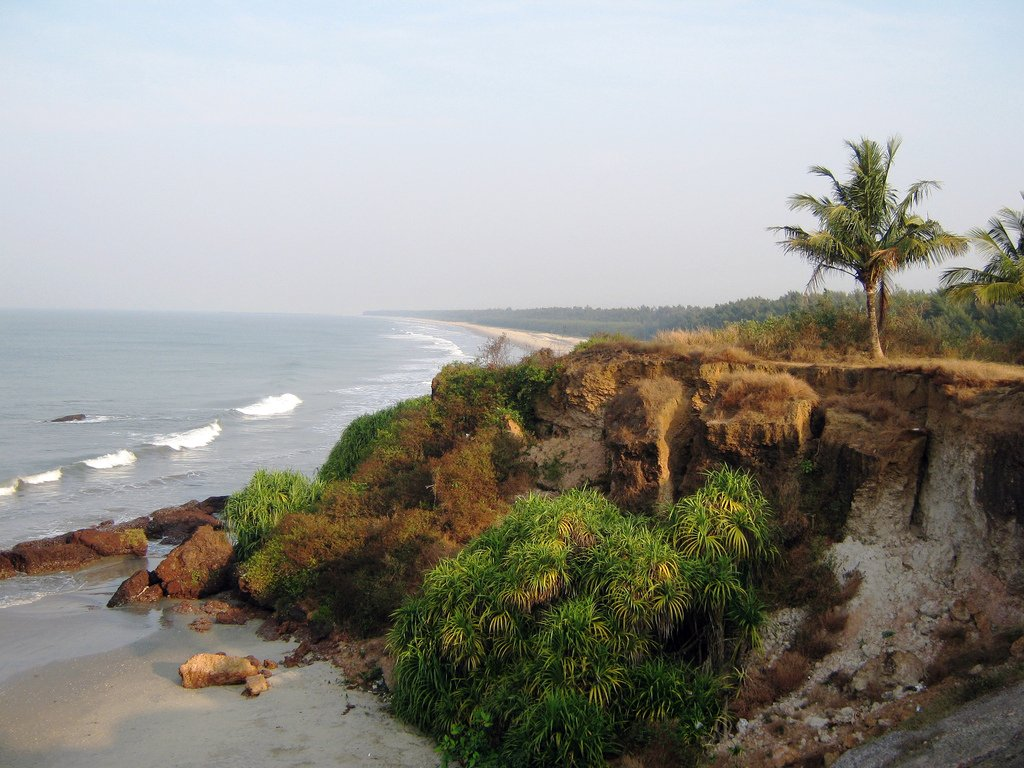
Meenkunnu Beach

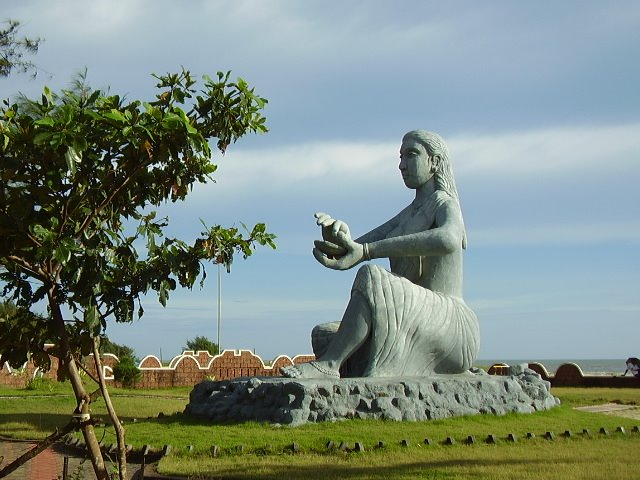
Chaalil Beach

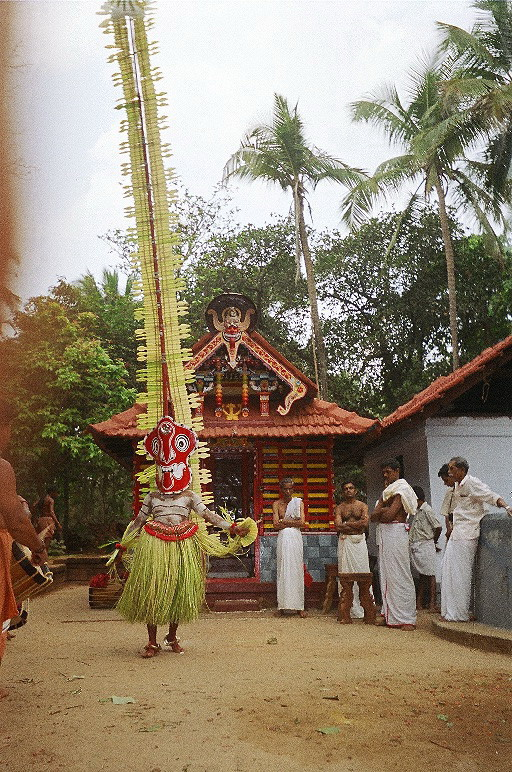
Gulikan on performance

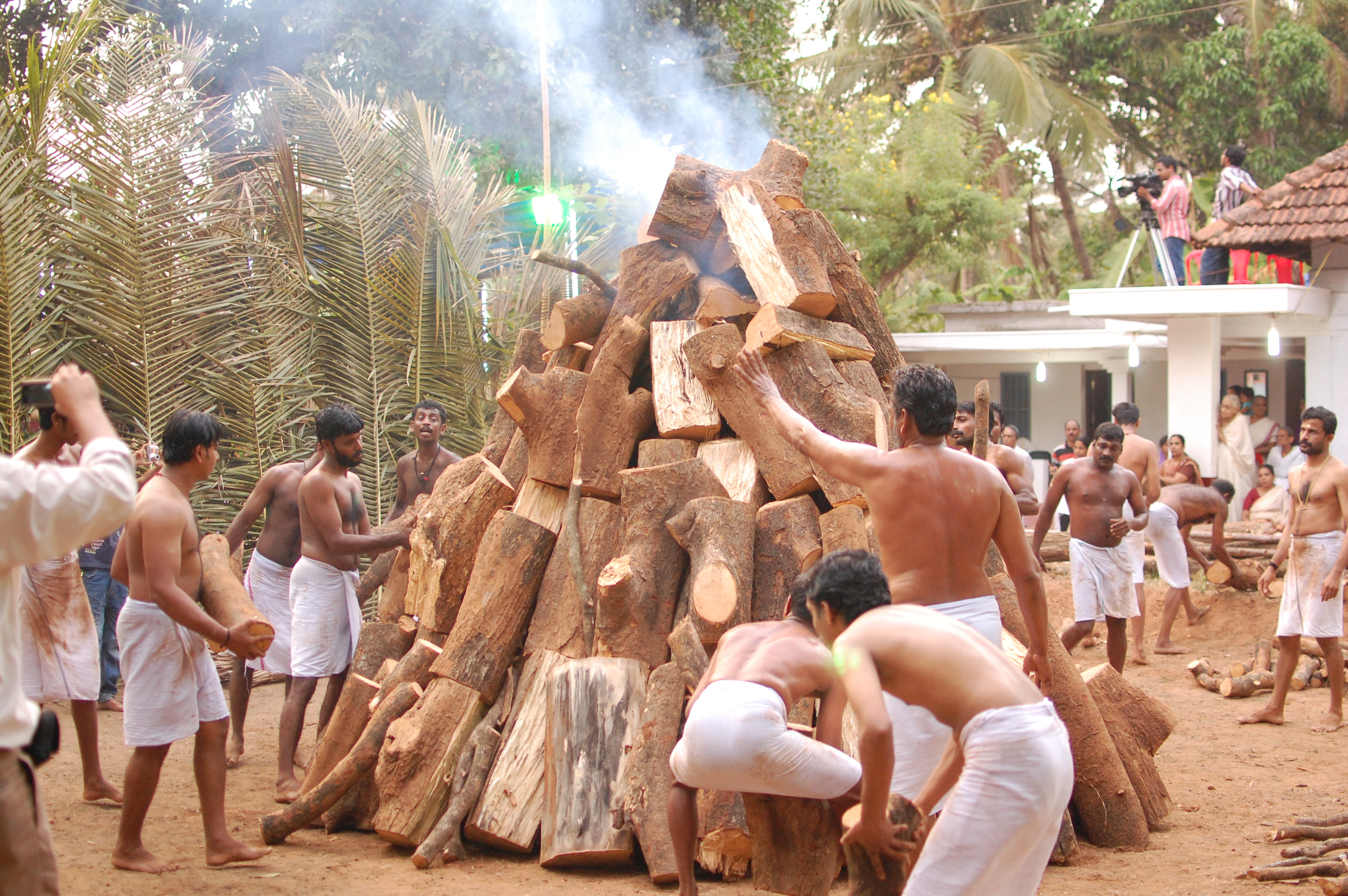
Starting fire

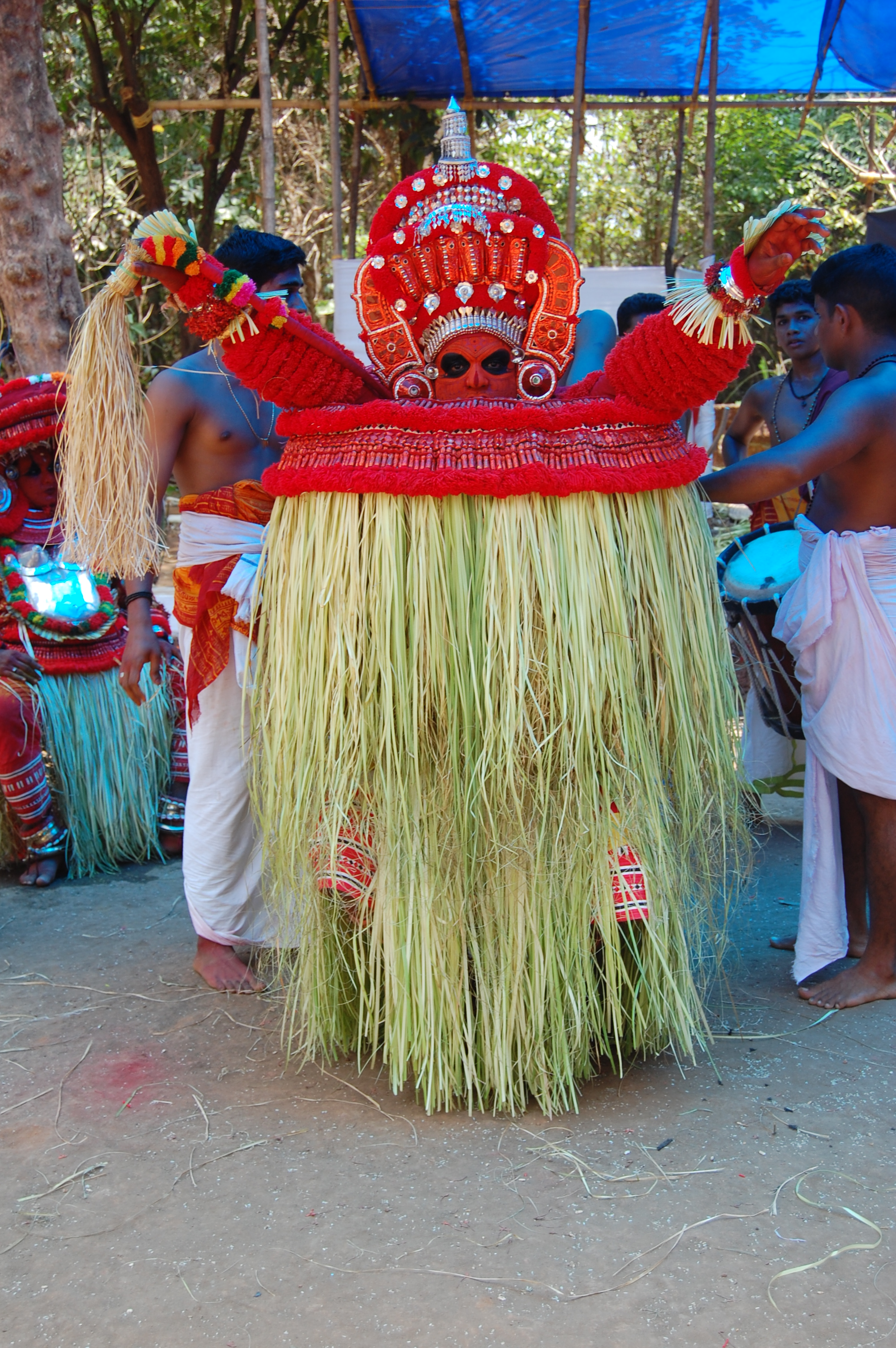
Sitting Vishnumoorthy
