= Chirakkal railway station =

Railway station in Kerala, India

Chirakkal

General information
- Location: Chirakkal, Kannur, Kerala; India
- Coordinates: 11.91075°N 75.35326°E
- System: Regional, light rail and commuter rail station
- Owner: Indian Railways
- Operator: Southern Railway zone
- Line: Shoranur–Mangalore line
- Platforms: 2
- Tracks: 2

Construction
- Structure type: At–grade
- Parking: Available

Other information
- Status: Defunct
- Station code: CQL
- Zone(s): Southern Railway zone
- Division(s): Palakkad
- Fare zone: Indian Railways

History
- Opened: 1904; 122 years ago
Location
- Location within India Location within Kerala

Chirakkal railway station (code: CQL) is a railway station in Kannur district, Kerala, and falls under the Palakkad railway division of the Southern Railway zone, Indian Railways. Amidst protest from regular passengers and organisations like DYFI, on 25 May 2025, Chirakkal railway station has permanently ceased operations as decided by the Indian Railways.
