= Bunty (disambiguation) =

Bunty was a British girls' comic.

Bunty may also refer to:

== Given name or nickname ==
- Bunty Afoa (born 1996), Samoan rugby league footballer
- Bunty Avieson, Australian writer
- Bunty Bailey (born 1964), English model, dancer and actress
- Bunty Bhangdiya, Maharashtra Legislative Assembly member
- Bunty James (born 1933), British television presenter
- Bunty Longrigg (1906–1974), English cricketer
- Bunty Stephens (1924–1978), English golfer
- Bunty Thompson (1925–2017), Australian equestrian
- Bunty Walia, Indian film producer

== Fictional characters ==
- Bunty Bagshaw, alter ego of Sarah Kennedy, British radio presenter
- Bunty Pulls the Strings, lost 1921 American silent comedy
- Bunty Bubbly Ki Mummy, Indian television series
- Bunty I Love You, Pakistani drama serial
- Bunty Aur Babli, 2005 Indian Hindi-language crime-comedy

== See also ==
- Banty or bandy, an ice hockey sport
- Belle & Bunty, British fashion design partnership
- Bunt (disambiguation)
- Bunti Roy, Indian cricketer
- Bunty Lawless (1935–1956), Canadian racehorse
- Jerome Bunty Chaffee (1825–1886), United States Senator from Colorado
