= Geethaanjali =

2013 Indian film by Priyadarshan

- Theatrical release poster
- Directed by: Priyadarshan
- Screenplay by: Abhilash Nair
- Dialogues by: Dennis Joseph
- Produced by: G.P. Vijayakumar
- Starring: Mohanlal; Keerthy Suresh; Nishan
- Cinematography: Tirru
- Edited by: T. S. Suresh
- Music by: Vidyasagar
- Production company: Seven Arts International
- Distributed by: Seven Arts Release
- Release date: 14 November 2013
- Running time: 150 minutes
- Country: India
- Language: Malayalam

Geethaanjali is a 2013 Indian Malayalam-language horror film directed by Priyadarshan and written by Abhilash Nair, with dialogue by Dennis Joseph. It is a spin-off of the 1993 film Manichitrathazhu and an official remake of the 2007 Thai film Alone. Mohanlal reprises his role from the original. The film also features Keerthy Suresh as the dual title characters and her debut film, Nishan, Siddique, Madhu, Swapna Menon, Innocent, and K. B. Ganesh Kumar. In the film, psychologist Dr. Sunny Joseph arrives at a mansion to treat Anjali, who is haunted by her deceased twin sister Geetha, and investigates the paranormal activities.

The film was originally planned to be shot in 3D and Auro-3D formats but this was abandoned because the technology was time-consuming and only a few theatres in Kerala were equipped with Auro sound equipment at that time. Principal photography commenced on 6 July 2013 at Thiruvananthapuram and was completed in September. Most of the filming took place at the Chitranjali Studio and in and around Thiruvananthapuram. The cinematographer was Tirru and editing was done by T. S. Suresh. The film marks debut adult role of Keerthy.

Geethaanjali was released worldwide on 14 November 2013. The film being an official remake of Alone was undisclosed before release, and as a result, it was criticised as an imitation of Alone and its source material, the novel Elephants Can Remember and other Indian films adapted from the film or novel. Mohanlal's performance, the cinematography and the graphics received praise. The film's storyline inspired an unofficial adaptation in Bhool Bhulaiyaa 2 (2022), a standalone sequel to Bhool Bhulaiyaa (2007), which in turn was a remake of Manichitrathazhu.

== Plot ==
It is believed that Anjali's twin sister Geetha has committed suicide. Anjali is betrothed to Anoop, a member of a prominent family who works in Mumbai. When her mother falls from a terrace and is bedridden paralysed, Anjali and Anoop go to her house in Arackal, Kerala. Once there, Geetha's spirit begins to haunt Anjali, which disturbs her a lot. Within days, a series of horrifying incidents occur. Anoop contacts Nakulan; in order to reach Dr. Sunny Joseph. Sunny eventually arrives from Machu Picchu to treat Anjali and to help her out of her crisis.

Since everyone believes the house to be haunted, the family buys a new house. The future owner of the house Vasu claims that he had seen Geetha in a car and wrote down the number on a file. He says that he could give it to them the next day, but he gets a phone call from Geetha's spirit asking him to meet her in the church next morning. He goes there and calls Sunny for help, but gets killed before Sunny could help him. Sunny then spots a car driving out of the church and follows it, but the killer already got out of the car before Sunny could spot him. Anjali tells Sunny that Geetha had committed suicide after she learned that Anjali and Anoop loved each other. Sunny then seeks help from Kadalikkattu Thirumeni who too discovered that Anjali was possessed by Geetha's ghost.

Gruesome events follow, including the death of Thambichayan, a caretaker at Arakal. Sunny tells everyone that the ghost haunting Anjali is just a psychological effect and not real. For some reason, he tries to postpone the marriage, but in vain. Anoop assumes that Sunny is trying to separate Anjali from him, and thus Anoop drives Sunny out of the house. It is then that he sees the death of Thambichayan who was caught in a fire from a cottage. On their engagement day, Sunny grabs Anoop and shoves him into his car. He drives to a small graveyard and tells Anoop that Anjali is actually Geetha, who has criminal intentions.

In a flashback, it is revealed that Anjali and Anoop fall in love with each other, but Geetha misunderstands that Anoop loved her and she loves him back. Geetha became angry that Anoop is going to marry Anjali and not her, and decided to take revenge on Anjali. Sunny then shows Anjali's grave to Anoop and tells him the whole truth about her. The feeling of guilt in her mind led her to see Anjali wherever she goes, and all the horrible incidents that happened were just illusions seen by Geetha. Vasu was actually killed by Thambi, the only person who knew the truth, apart from Geetha and her mother. It is also shown that it was Geetha who accidentally shoved her mother off the terrace, when she was told that Anjali's spirit was in the house. Thambi is later killed by Geetha so that there is no way anyone could unravel the truth. Sunny, still unsure, tried to postpone their marriage until he had collected enough evidence to reveal the truth.

Hearing this, Anoop storms into the house and accused Geetha of taking Anjali's name. Geetha tries to kill Anoop when he says that he does not want her anymore. She finally revealed that it was she who killed Anjali during the argument in the beach (while she conveniently concocted a different version when Sunny had earlier asked about the beach incident). Anoop almost gets paralyzed by Geetha and is about to be killed. Sunny breaks into the house and rescues Anoop, but she takes a gun and tries to aim at them but as the gun was not loaded, it didn't fire. An image of Anjali's spirit appears in Geetha's mind (on a mirror) and prevents her from shooting Anoop. Geetha is killed by a fire in the house, and Anjali's "spirit" watches over Geetha while she is dying. Later, Geetha's grave is built alongside Anjali's, and Anoop, his family, and Thankappan thank Sunny for helping them.

== Cast ==
- Mohanlal as Dr. Sunny Joseph, a psychiatrist
- Keerthy Suresh in a dual role as
  - Geetha Jacob
    - Safa Haneefa as young Geetha
  - Anjali Jacob
    - Marwa Haneefa as young Anjali
- Nishan as Anoop, Geetha's and Anjali's love interest
- Madhu as Babychayan
- Innocent as Thankappan
- Seema as Anamma
- Nassar as Kathalikaattu Thirumeni (voiceover by Shobi Thilakan)
- Siddique as Thampichayan
- K. B. Ganesh Kumar as Vasu
- Harisree Ashokan as Exorcist Kochu Kuttadan
- Swapna Menon as Mary
- Mahesh Padmanabhan as Koshy
- Sunil Kumar as Roy
- Ajayan as Johny
- Maya Vishwanath as Moly
- Ambika Mohan as Gracie
- Pradeep Chandran as Doctor
- Arun Benny as Keshavan, a servant
- Soniya Malhaar as Bindu, a servant
- Daniel Moorehead as Englishman
- Suresh Gopi as Nakulan (cameo appearance)

== Production ==
=== Development ===
"This is not a story-based movie, 'Geethanjali' is more of a suspense-packed psychological thriller. Basically, it's about a girl who is supposed to be dead years back, but her body is yet to be found. Suddenly she starts appearing in the house and what follows is an endless string of dreadful incidents. The situation worsens when the Mumbai-returned Anjali, Keerthi's character in the film, lands there".

— Priyadarshan, about the subject.

Priyadarshan had earlier worked as a second-unit director, along with Siddique, Lal, and Sibi Malayil, on Manichitrathazhu (1993), which was directed by his friend Fazil. Priyadarsan said Mohanlal wanted to revive Sunny and was looking for a suitable subject and storyline. He said, "I had been telling [Priyadarshan] that he should revive Sunny as I felt that he was a character with immense potential for a new film; someone who can fit into any background or period. In this movie, Sunny reappears, a little older, but no less wacky than in his previous outing." The film is not an official sequel to Manichitrathazhu, but Mohanlal portrays the psychiatrist Dr. Sunny Joseph, the character he acted in Manichitrathazhu.

About the genre, Priyadarshan described: "It is more of a thriller and a whodunit. To maintain the feel of the theme, there is no slapstick comedy or forced attempts at humor. At the same time, I have infused humour into some of the scenes to ease the tension". According to the director, Geethanjali is a psychological thriller set in a supposedly-haunted bungalow. Since the story has a Christian backdrop, he engaged screenwriter Dennis Joseph to help with the dialogue. Shobana, who played Ganga in Manichitrathazhu was to make a guest appearance to introduce Dr. Sunny as the psychiatrist who cured her. However, that plan did not work out. Geethaanjali was an official remake of the 2007 Thai film Alone.

=== Casting ===
Mohanlal reprised the role of Dr. Sunny Joseph, the protagonist in Manichithrathazhu. The production team were looking for a heroine; they shortlisted a few people from the Tamil, Telugu, Malayalam, and Hindi film industries during pre-production in June 2012. Keerthy Suresh, daughter of veteran actress Menaka and producer Suresh Kumar was selected for her debut lead role; she has earlier appeared as a child artiste in films Pilots (2000), Achaneyanenikkishtam (2001), and Kuberan (2002), and in a tele-film by Suresh Krishna. Her father Kumar is a family friend of Mohanlal and Priyadarshan. Nishan K. P. Nanaiah was cast as Anoop, the fiancée of the character acted by Keerthy Suresh. Actor Innocent made a comeback to films with Geethanjali after his cancer treatment, he agreed to act on the insistence of Priyadarshan and Mohanlal and allotted ten days for the shoot.

K. B. Ganesh Kumar was also signed in a role. Although Innocent and Ganesh appeared in Manichitrathazhu, they portrayed two new characters in Geethaanjali. Swapna Menon was cast as the daughter of Thankappan (Innocent); her characterisation was similar to that of the female version of Chanthu (Sudheesh) in Manichithrathazhu. Late actor-director Cochin Haneefa's twin daughters Safa and Marwa played the childhood of Geetha and Anjali. They have no dialogue and are only seen in a song sequence. Suresh Gopi reprised his role as Nakulan in a cameo appearance. It was the first time Priyadarshan worked with veteran actors Madhu, Siddique, and Harisree Ashokan.

=== Filming ===
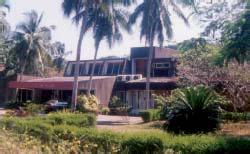
Chitranjali Studio in Trivandrum was a significant location

Principal photography commenced on 6 July 2013 at Thiruvananthapuram. Priyadarshan began initial filming with two units—one at Kovalam and another on a set at the Pothencode palace. He tried to finish the shoot by 20 August, which left three weeks to complete post-production. The film was shot on locations in and around Thiruvananthapuram and Chitranjali Studio. Ninety percent of it was shot in Thiruvananthapuram and the remaining ten percent was shot in Dubai and New Delhi. In early September, Mohanlal announced he had completed shooting and had moved on to another film.

The film's makers had initially planned to make the film in 3D format, but this was abandoned because of the cost of production and the technology was time-consuming and filming would take much longer than planned. Priyadarshan also intended to use the Auro sound format, but no theatre in Kerala was equipped with that technology at that time, so he abandoned that idea too. Tirru was the director of photography. The music for the film was provided by Vidyasagar and the film was edited by T. S. Suresh. Lalgudi N. Ilaiyaraja was in charge of the art department.

== Release ==
Geethaanjali was awarded a U/A certificate by the Central Board of Film Certification. The film's theatrical release, which was earlier planned for October 2013, was postponed until 14 November because of a delay in graphics works. Geethanjali was released in over 300 theatres worldwide on 14 November 2013, including 90 theatres in Kerala, distribution was done by Seven Arts Release in India. PJ Entertainments bought the distribution rights for Europe; they released in the United Kingdom in 61 theatres, Austria, Finland, Germany, Sweden, and Italy. The release in Singapore was delayed until 16 November; there it was distributed by Singapore Coliseum. The film also had a release in Japan. The television satellite rights were purchased by Asianet before release.

== Reception ==
=== Critical reaction ===
Sify.com criticised the film's similarity to the 2007 Thai film Alone and its Kannada-Tamil bilingual remake film Chaarulatha (2012). Sify.com also said, "Even if you haven't watched the original, this film is badly written and is barely engaging". Paresh C. Palicha of Rediff.com awarded it two stars out of five stars; he said the story is borrowed from many sources including the Thai film Alone and its Indian adaptation Chaarulatha, and also noted a "striking" similarity to the 2007 Malayalam film Nadiya Kollappetta Rathri.

Aswin J. Kumar of The Times of India gave the film two-and-a-half stars out of five, and stated, "Geethanjali plays around a script that is constantly unsteady, giving away hints far too quickly or getting immersed in trifles just for the purpose of stretching the narrative. Even without comparisons, the movie never attains the arresting enigma of a psychological narrative."

=== Theatrical run ===
Geethanjaly was released in around 300 theatres worldwide on 14 November. Seven Arts Release distributed the film in India. The film collected ₹10.5 million (US$110,000) on the opening day in Kerala; it grossed ₹30.8 million (US$330,000) from Kerala and ₹12 million (US$130,000) from other Indian states within four days of its release, totalling ₹42.8 million (US$460,000) gross from four days in India. In the UK, Geethanjaly grossed £14,403; considering the theatrical revenue, it was unsuccessful at the box office in its final run. In 2016, the film was dubbed into Tamil as Vennila Minnala, with the makers hoping to gain revenue from Keerthy Suresh's new-found popularity in the Tamil film industry.

=== Alleged influences ===
Although it was an official remake of Alone it was kept under wrap. The screenplay of Geethaanjali was criticised for its similarity to the films Alone (2007), Chaarulatha (2012), and Nadiya Kollappetta Rathri (2007). Geethanjali was mentioned in an online article published by International Business Times in 2014 which described that the film was partially inspired by the detective novel Elephants Can Remember written by Agatha Christie. The Kannada-Tamil bilingual film Chaarulatha was released in 2012 as an official remake of the 2007 Thai film Alone. Both Alone and Nadiya Kollappetta Rathri, were loosely based on Elephants Can Remember, which was published in 1972.

== Soundtrack ==
Geethaanjali

Soundtrack album by Vidyasagar
- Released: 16 June 2014
- Recorded: Varsha Vallaki Studios
- Genre: Feature Film Soundtrack
- Length: 23:27
- Language: Malayalam
- Label: East Coast Audios
- Producer: Vidyasagar

Vidyasagar chronology
Nadodimannan (2013)	Geethaanjali (2014)	Jannal Oram (2013)

The film's soundtrack was composed by Vidyasagar, with lyrics written by O. N. V. Kurup. The tracks "Koodilla Kuyilamme" and "Pavizha Munthiri" were revisions of "Jaana Hai Tujhko" and "Maine Hawa Ke Paron" from Priyadarshan's 2008 Hindi film Mere Baap Pehle Aap. The original soundtrack album of the film was officially released at a function held at Dreams Hotel, Kochi, in November 2013.

Track list
No.	Title	Singer(s)	Length
1.	"Koodilla Kuyilamme"	M. G. Sreekumar, Shweta Mohan	05:05
2.	"Doore Doore (Female Vocals)"	Rajalakshmy	04:25
3.	"Pavizhamunthiri Then"	M. G. Sreekumar, Jyotsna Radhakrishnan	04:57
4.	"Doore Doore (Male Vocals)"	M. G. Sreekumar	04:25
5.	"Madhumathi Poovirinjuvo"	Abhirami Ajai, Ajmal, Srivardhini	04:35
Total length:			27:58

== See also ==
- Manichitrathazhu, original film of the spin-off
- Elephants Can Remember, a detective novel by Agatha Christie
- List of Malayalam horror films
