= Bunt =

Bunt may refer to:

== People ==
- Darrell Bunt (1902–1977), Royal Navy chaplain
- Dick Bunt (1929–2021), American basketball player
- Raymond Bunt (born 1944), Pennsylvania politician
- Bunt Stephens (John L. Stephens, 1889–1951), or Uncle Bunt, American old-time fiddle player
- Bunt (DJ), a German DJ

== Other uses ==
- Bunt (baseball), a batting technique
- Bunt (community), a community in South-West India
- Bunt (sail), a part of a ship's sail
- Bunt Island, in Antarctica
- Bunt, a novel by Wladyslaw Reymont
- The Bunt, nickname of the Buntingford branch line in Hertfordshire, England
- Bunt, an aerobatic maneuver
- Bunt, a fungal disease of grasses (including wheat, barley, and rye), such as karnal bunt, common bunt and dwarf bunt

== See also ==
- Bundt cake
- Bunting (bird)
- van de Bunt, a Dutch surname
- Bunt v Hallinan, 1985 case in New Zealand land law
