= Bowl Island =

Island in Enderby Land, Antarctica

- Location within Antarctica

Geography
- Location: Antarctica
- Coordinates: 67°9′S 50°50′E

Administration
- Administered under the Antarctic Treaty System

Demographics
- Population: Uninhabited

Bowl Island (67°9′S 50°50′E) is an island with a bowl-like depression in the center, lying just south of Crohn Island at the head of Amundsen Bay, Enderby Land. It was sighted in 1956 by an Australian National Antarctic Research Expeditions field party and given this descriptive name.

== See also ==
- List of Antarctic and sub-Antarctic islands
