= Bunt Island =

Island in Enderby Land, Antarctica

- Location within Antarctica

Geography
- Location: Antarctica
- Coordinates: 67°9′S 50°57′E

Administration
- Administered under the Antarctic Treaty System

Demographics
- Population: Uninhabited

Bunt Island (67°9′S 50°57′E) is an island just east of Bowl Island at the head of Amundsen Bay in Enderby Land. It was sighted in 1956 by an Australian National Antarctic Research Expeditions airborne field party, and named by the Antarctic Names Committee of Australia for J. Bunt, biologist at Mawson Station in 1956.

== See also ==
- List of Antarctic and sub-Antarctic islands
- WorldAtlas
