= Bunt v Hallinan =

- Court: Court of Appeal of New Zealand
- Full case name: Bunt v Hallinan
- Decided: 27 November 1984
- Citation: [1985] 1 NZLR 450
- Transcript: Court of Appeal judgment

Court membership
- Judges sitting: Richardson J, McMullin J, Eichelbaum J

Bunt v Hallinan [1985] 1 NZLR 450 is a cited case in New Zealand land law.
