= Van de Bunt =

Van de Bunt is a surname. Notable people with the surname include:

- Arie van de Bunt (born 1969), Dutch water polo player
- Jerry van de Bunt (born 1992), Dutch motorcycle racer
- Marjorie van de Bunt (born 1968), Dutch Paralympian
