= Crohn Island =

Island in Enderby Land, Antarctica

- Location within Antarctica

Geography
- Location: Antarctica
- Coordinates: 67°7′S 50°52′E

Administration
- Administered under the Antarctic Treaty System

Demographics
- Population: Uninhabited

Crohn Island is an island 0.9 kilometres (0.5 nmi) east of Beaver Island at the head of Amundsen Bay in Enderby Land. It was sighted in 1956 by an Australian National Antarctic Research Expeditions airborne field party led by Peter W. Crohn, a geologist at Mawson Station in 1955 and 1956, for whom it is named.

== See also ==
- List of Antarctic and sub-Antarctic islands
