= Belle & Bunty =

British fashion design house

Belle & Bunty is a British fashion design partnership between Alice-Louise Shreeve and Hannah Coniam.

Their designs have appeared in Vogue, Elle, Victoria Beckham's That Extra Half An Inch and Marie Claire. In 2005, Shreeve received the Everywoman Artemis Award for most inspirational businesswoman under 25. In 2006, the designers were filmed for a Channel 4 Learning programme in the Tricky Business series.
