= Arackal =

- village
- Location in Kerala, India Arackal (India)
- Coordinates: 8.9479900°N 76.8630680°E
- Country: India
- State: Kerala
- District: Kollam

Population (2011)
  - Total: 17,240

Languages
  - Official: Malayalam, English
- Time zone: UTC+5:30 (IST)
- Vehicle registration: KL-25
- Nearest city: thadicadu
- Vidhan Sabha constituency: Punalur

Arackal is a village in Kollam district in the state of Kerala, India.village in Kollam district in the state of Kerala, India. It comes under Punalur assembly, Kollam parliamentary constituency and Anchal block panchayat. The place have a good functional Village office too. Arackal village has population of 17240 as per the Census India 2011. Arackal is known for farming and agricultural trade like Ginger, Black Pepper, Paddy, Rubber etc. One of the famous eco tourism in malamel para and famous temple is Arackal Devi Temple. Places in Arackal village Thadicadu, Thevarthottam, Arackal, Edayam.

== Demographics ==
As of the 2011 Census of India, Arackal had a population of 17240 with 8026 males and 9214 females.
