= Dharmadom =

Dharmadam
- Census Town
- Location in Kerala, India
- Coordinates: 11.793550°N 75.4709320°E
- Country: India
- State: Kerala
- District: Kannur

Area
  - Total: 10.66 km^{2} (4.12 sq mi)

Population (2011)
  - Total: 30,804
  - Density: 2,890/km^{2} (7,484/sq mi)

Languages
  - Official: Malayalam, English
- Time zone: UTC+5:30 (IST)
- PIN: 670106
- Telephone code: 91 (0)490
- ISO 3166 code: IN-KL
- Vehicle registration: KL 58
- Nearest city: Thalassery
- Sex ratio: 1000:1202 ♂/♀
- Lok Sabha constituency: Kannur
- Vidhan Sabha constituency: Dharmadam
- Website: dharmadam.info

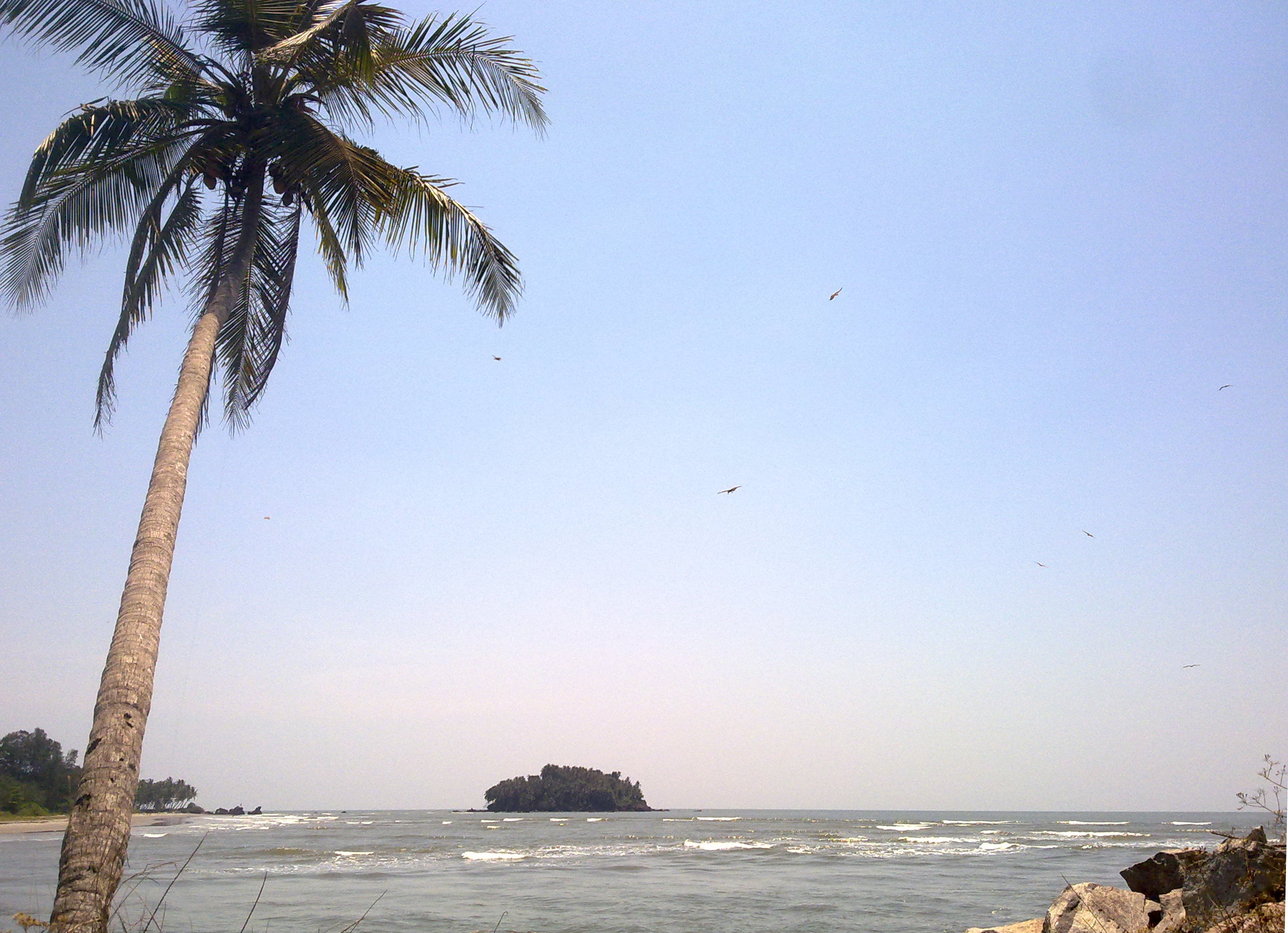
Dharmadam Island

Dharmadom or Dharmadam is a Census Town in Kannur district in the state of Kerala, India. This town is located in between Anjarakandi River and Ummanchira River, and Palayad town and Arabian Sea. It is known for the 100-year-old Government Brennen College, Dharmadam Island, and the famous Muzhappilangad beach.

== History ==
Dharmadom is a scenic coastal town that was earlier known as "Dharmapattanam". It was an active Buddhist area in ancient times. Arabs called it as Darmaftan.

Dharmadom is also home to famous Andalurkavu temple. The annual festival here draws thousands of devotees. A variety of Theyyam is performed at this event. India’s premier circus Academy, Circus Academy Thalassery is also located in Dharmadom.

Dharmadom was selected as location for the prominent British Thalassery fort that was built in 1703 but landowners did not want to sell the land.

According to Qissat Shakarwati Farmad, a mosque was built in Dharmadam during the era of Malik Dinar.

The island of Dharmapattanam was claimed by all of the Kolattu Rajas, Kottayam Rajas, and Arakkal Bibi in the late medieval period. The island of Dharmadam was ceded to the East India Company in 1734, along with Thalassery.

== Demographics ==
As of 2011 Census, Dharmadam had a population of 30,804. Males constitute 45.4% of the population and females 54.6%. The average sex ratio was 1202 higher than state average of 1084. Dharmadam census town has an area of 10.66 km^{2} (4.12 sq mi) with 6,751 families residing in it. Dharmadom had an average literacy rate of 97.2%, higher than the state average of 94%: male literacy was 98.4% and, female literacy was 96.3%. In Dharmadam, 9.2% of the population is under 6 years of age.

Social composition in Dharmadom (2011)
Community	Percent
Thiyyar	50.82%
Other Hindu	26.78%
Islam	20.97%
Christianity	1.29%

== Gallery ==
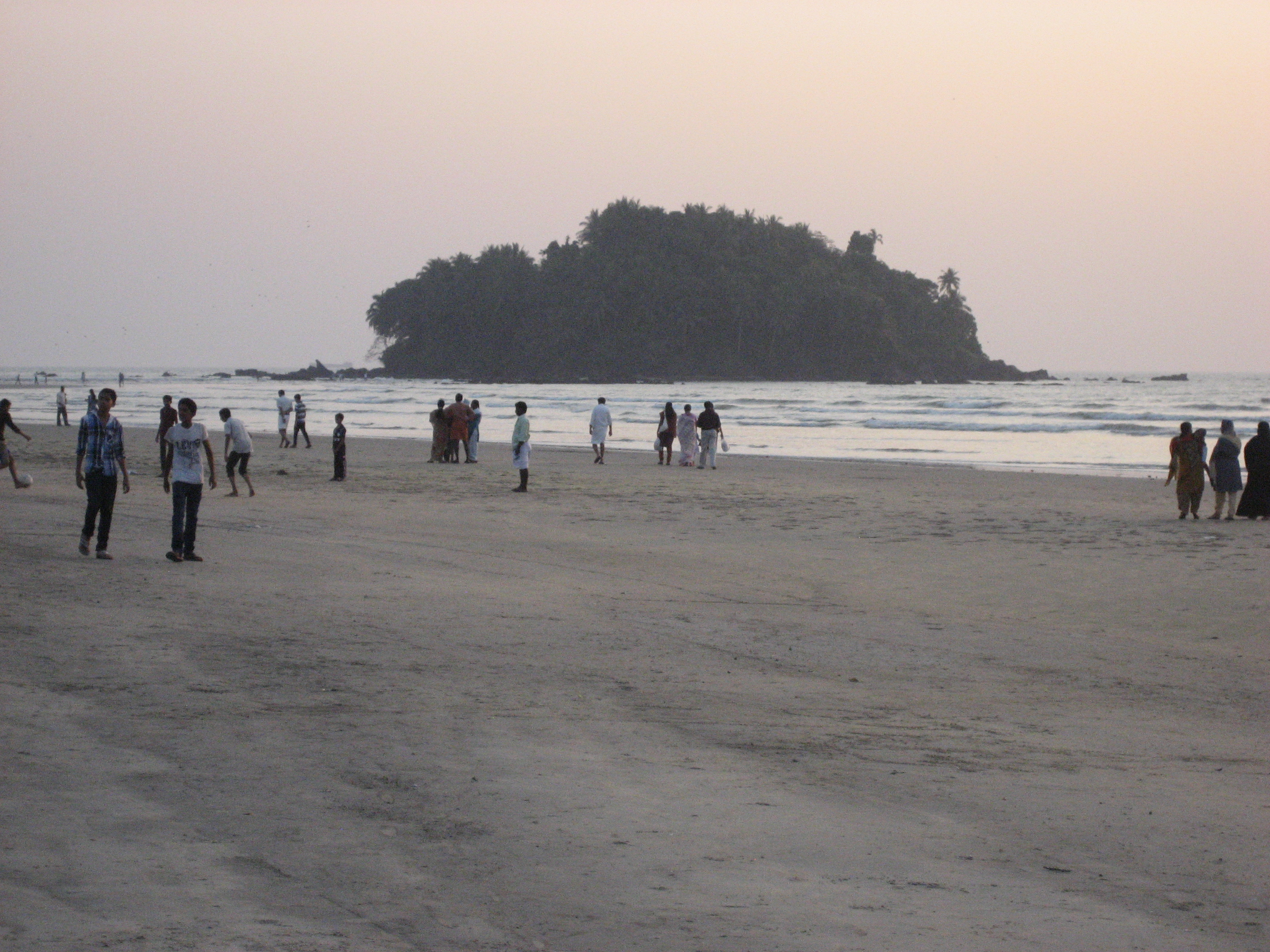

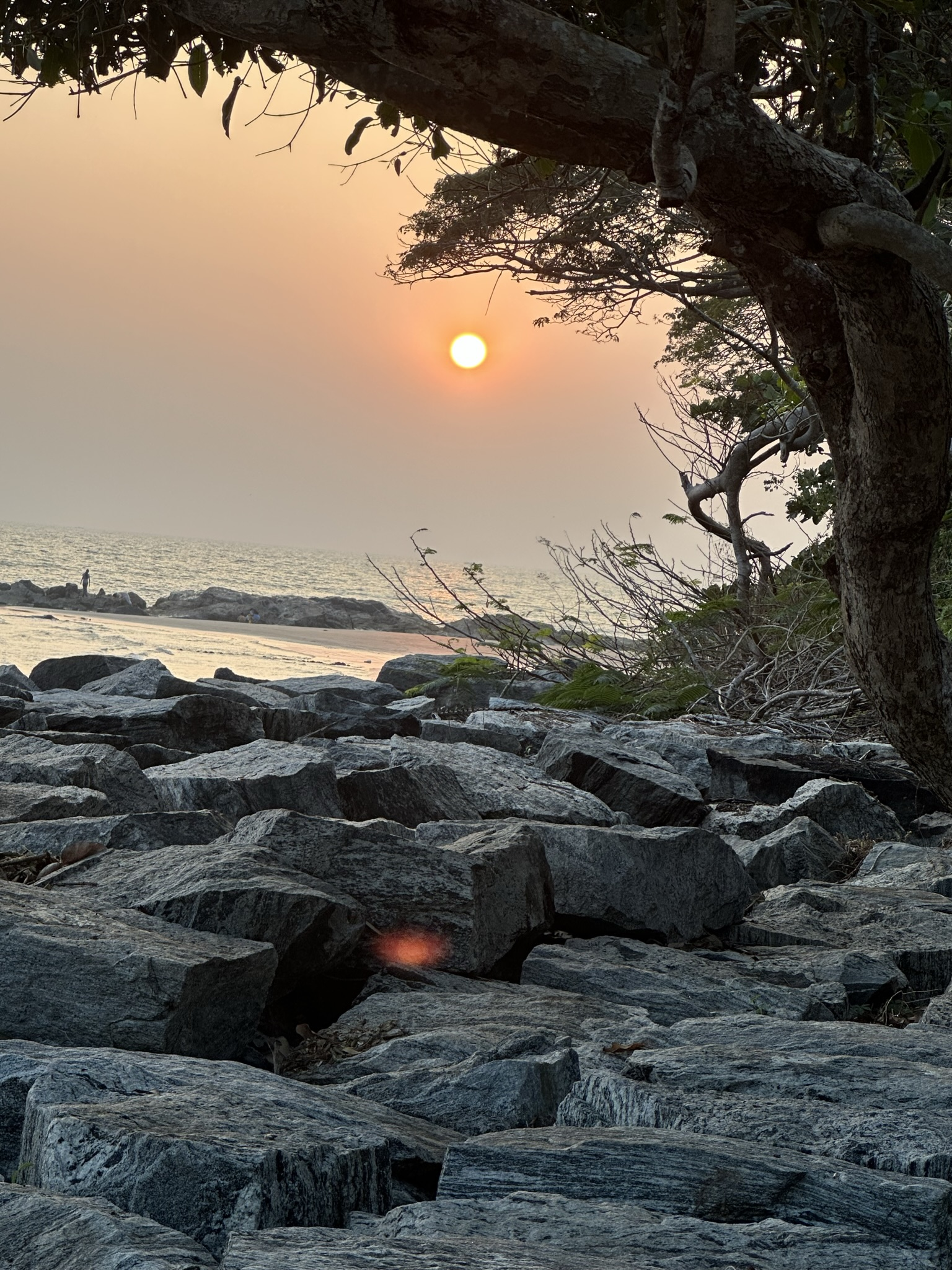

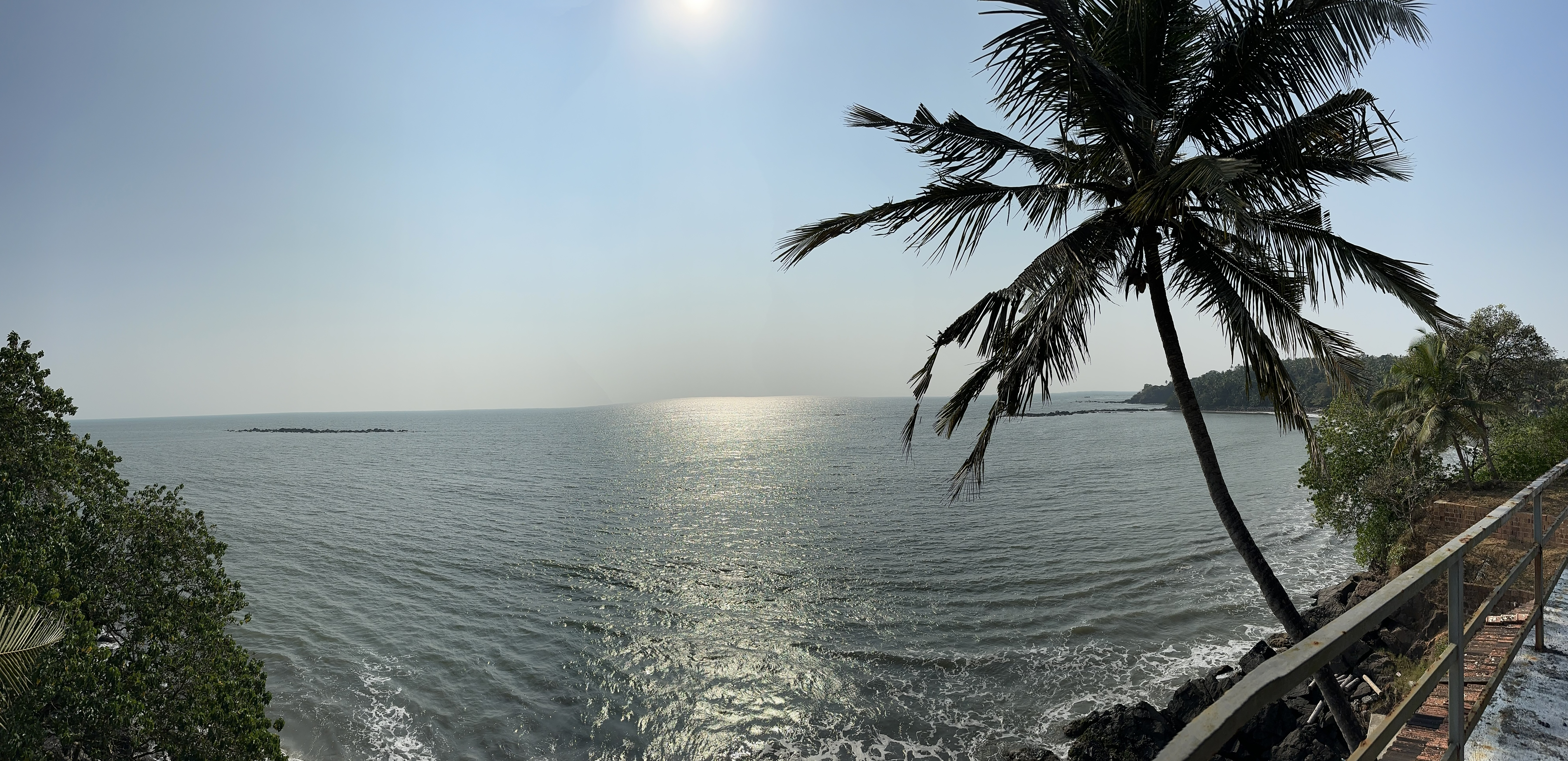

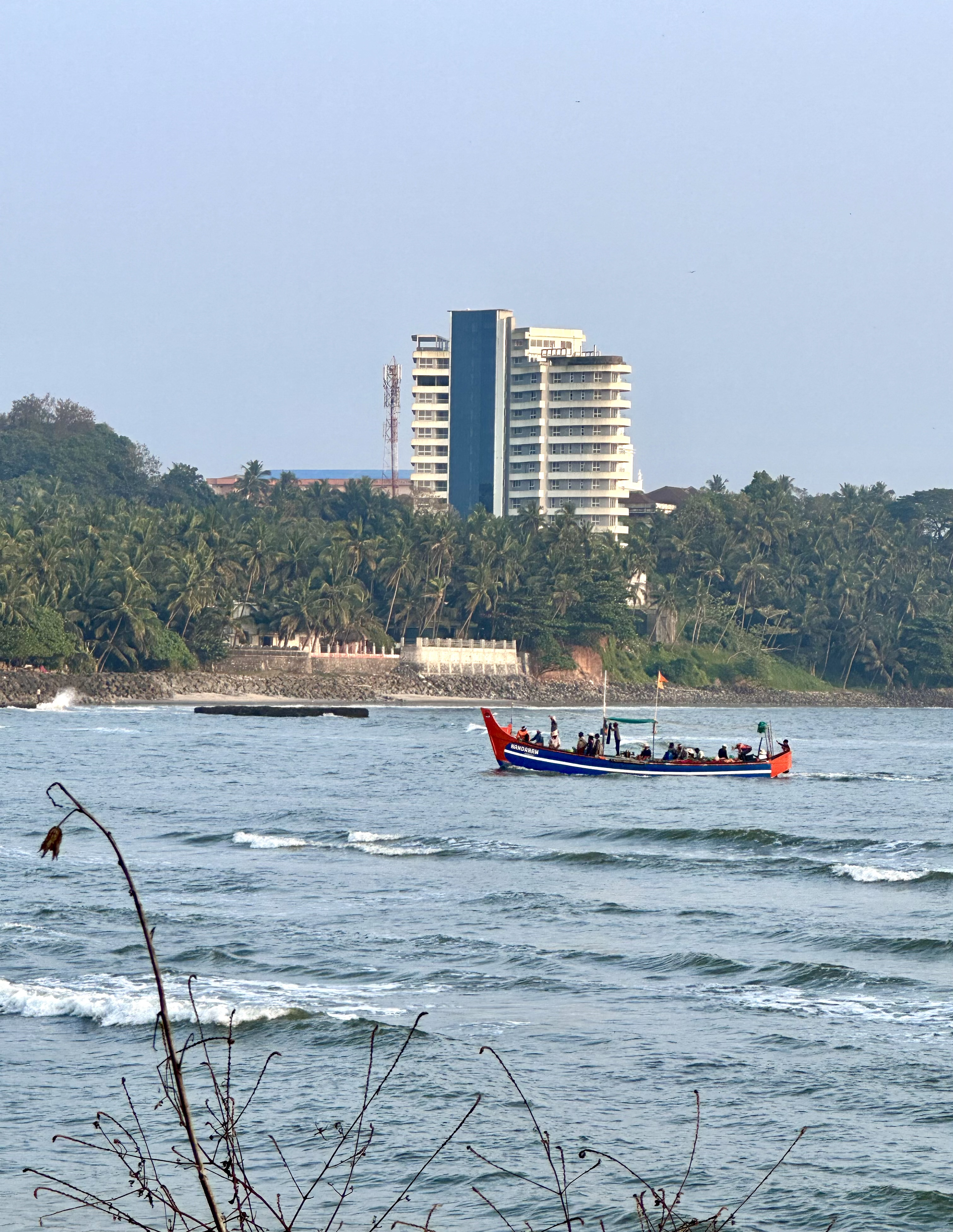

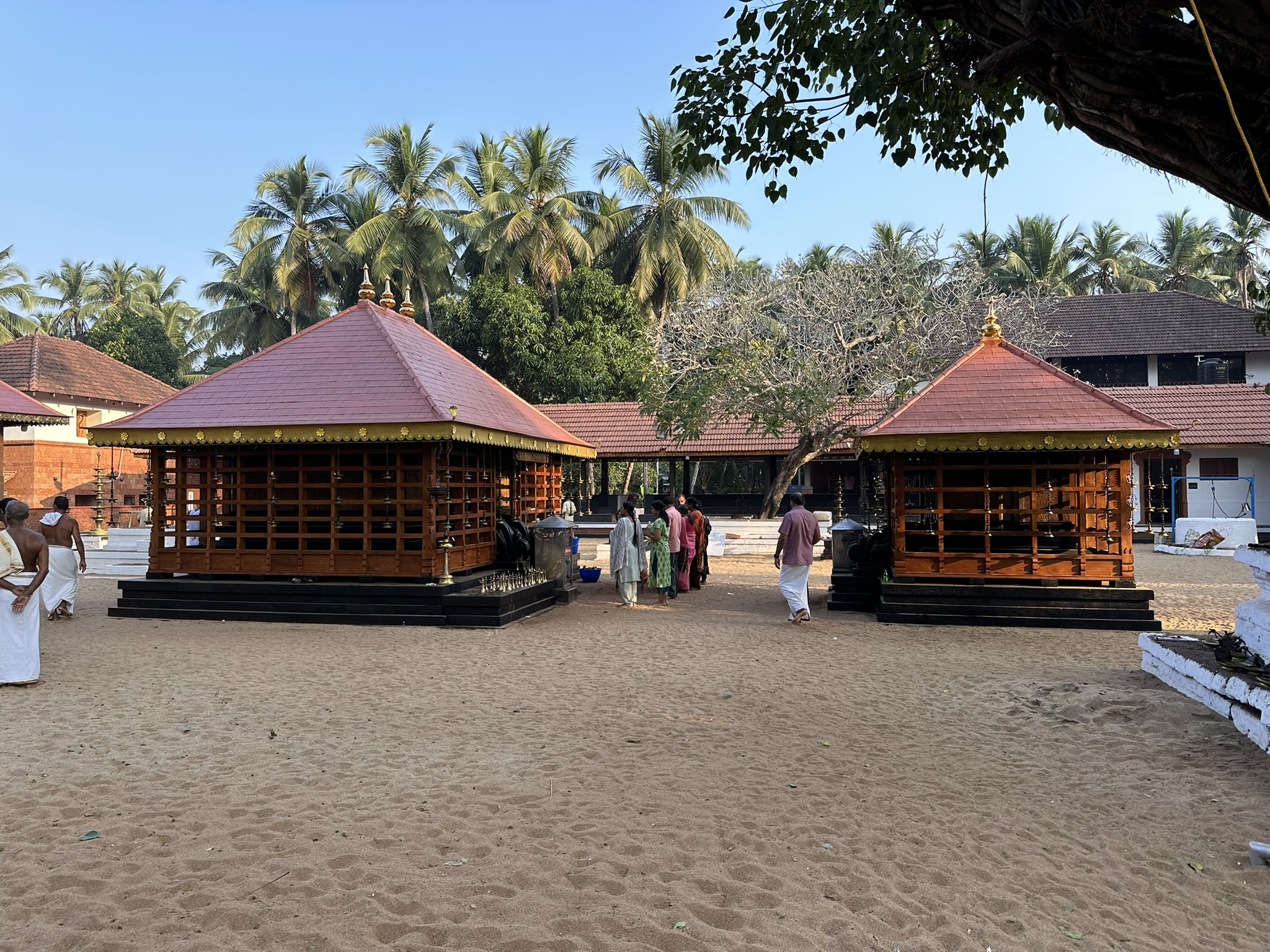

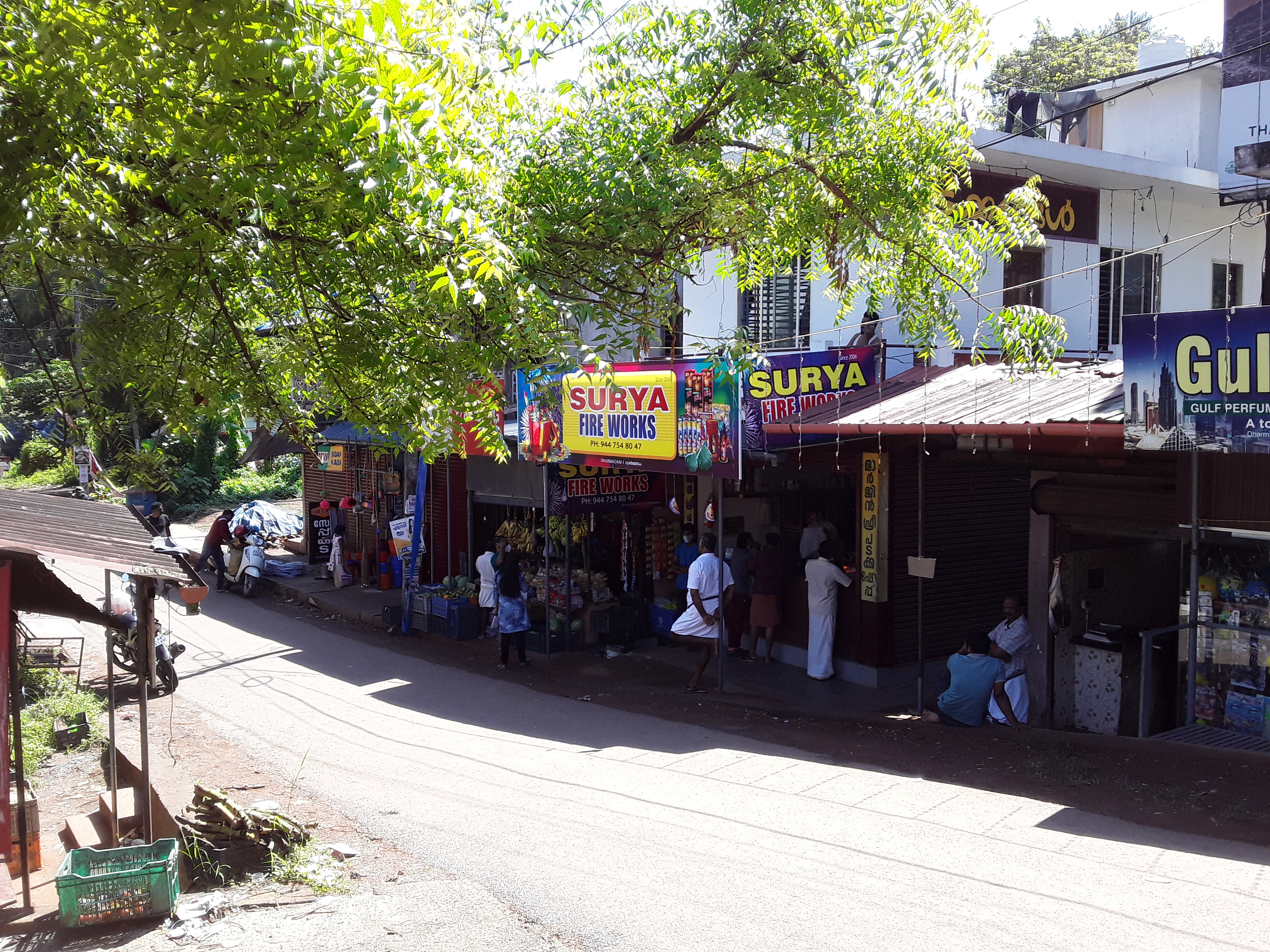

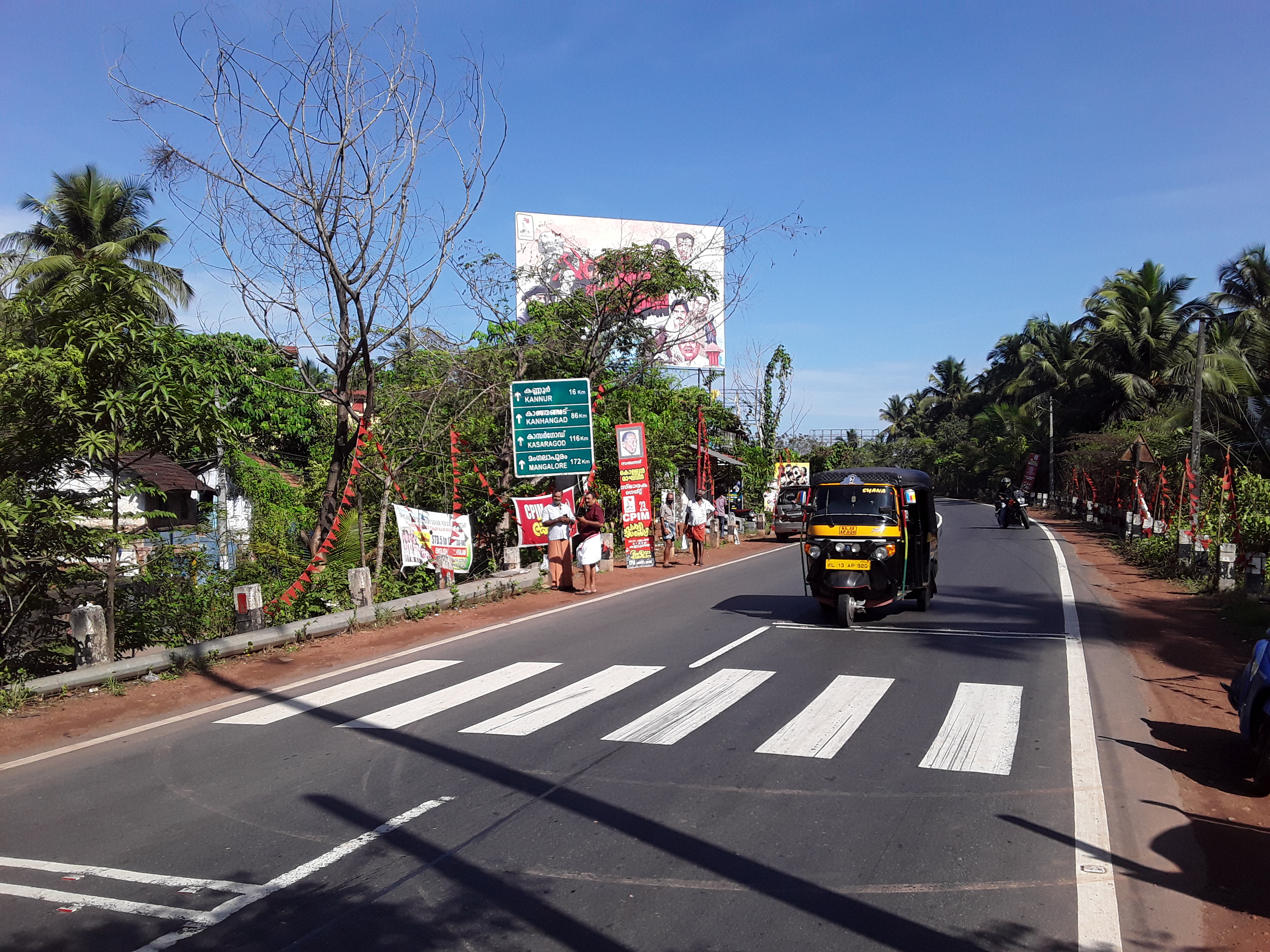

== See also ==
- Muzhappilangad
- Muzhappilangad beach
- Dharmadam Island
- Thalassery
- Thalassery cuisine
- Kannur
- Palayad
- Andalur
- Mangalore
- Sree Andalurkavu
- Educational Institutes in Thalassery
