= Andalurkavu =

Hindu temple in Kerala, India

- അണ്ടല്ലൂർക്കാവ്
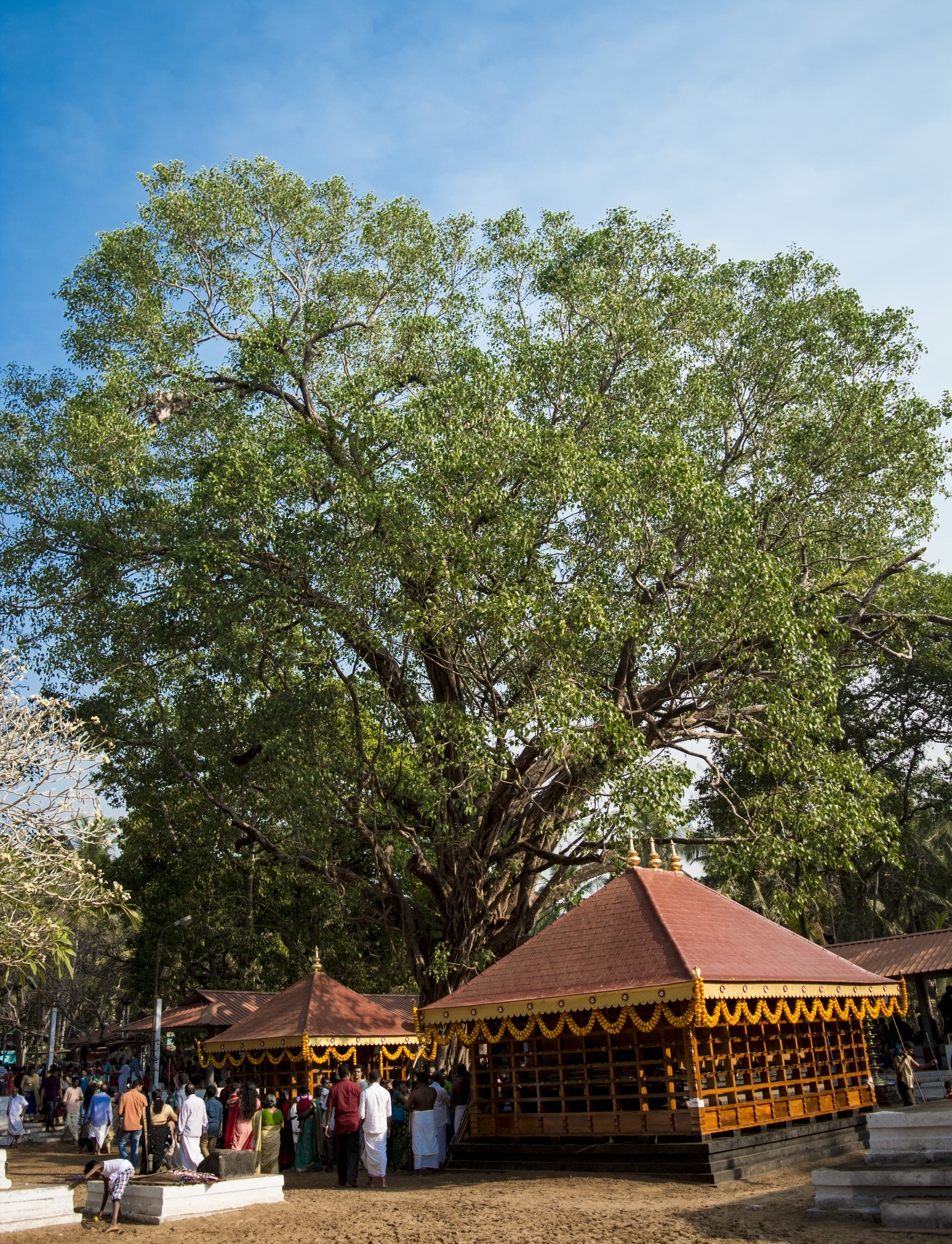

Religion
- Affiliation: Hinduism
- Deity: Rama, Lakshmana, Hanuman

Location
- Location: Thalassery, Kannur, Kerala, India
- Interactive map of Andalurkavu
- Coordinates: 11°47′41″N 75°28′38″E

Architecture
- Type: India

Andalurkavu is a very ancient, famous and prominent Thiyyar Community Urayima temple in Andalur in Dharmadam village of Kannur district, Kerala, India. This ancient temple is in the name of Lord Rama and the main festival is celebrated in mid-February: the first week of the month "Kumbam" of the Malayalam calendar. The administrative authority of this temple (known as the Kottil) belonged to six Thiyyar ancestral houses (Tharavadu) held by the "Four Thara Achans." This center of power functioned as an autonomous region.

A unique tradition exists here, when a Thiyyar boy is born in these four regions, a small bow and arrow are made in his name and offered to the temple, dedicating the child to the service of the shrine. Because thousands of such bows accumulate by the end of the year, the shrine is famously addressed as "Andalure Aayiram Ville" (The Thousand Bows of Andalur)

== Etymology ==
The name Andalurkavu ("Andar-villoor-kavu") can be interpreted as the grove where the sacred weapons of deities are kept. There are interesting interpretations behind the names of all the other places that surround Andalur like Melur, Palayad and Dharmadam.

== Worship ==
In Andalur kavu Thira is the main festival. It is one of the rare places where Yuddha kanda of Ramayana — the great epic — is visualised and performed. The main deities are Rama(as Daivathaar), Lakshmana(as Angakkaran) and Hanuman(as Bappuran). One significance for this kavu is that it has two holy places called Mele Kavu (upper temple) and Thazhe kavu (lower temple).

The ThazheKavu is a sacred grove that harbors several rare plant species typical of the Myristica swamps, notably Syzygium travancoricum, an endangered endemic plant. Much of the flora of the sacred grove has been lost due to poor regeneration and the disturbance from cattle and human activity in this thickly populated area.

== Annual festival ==
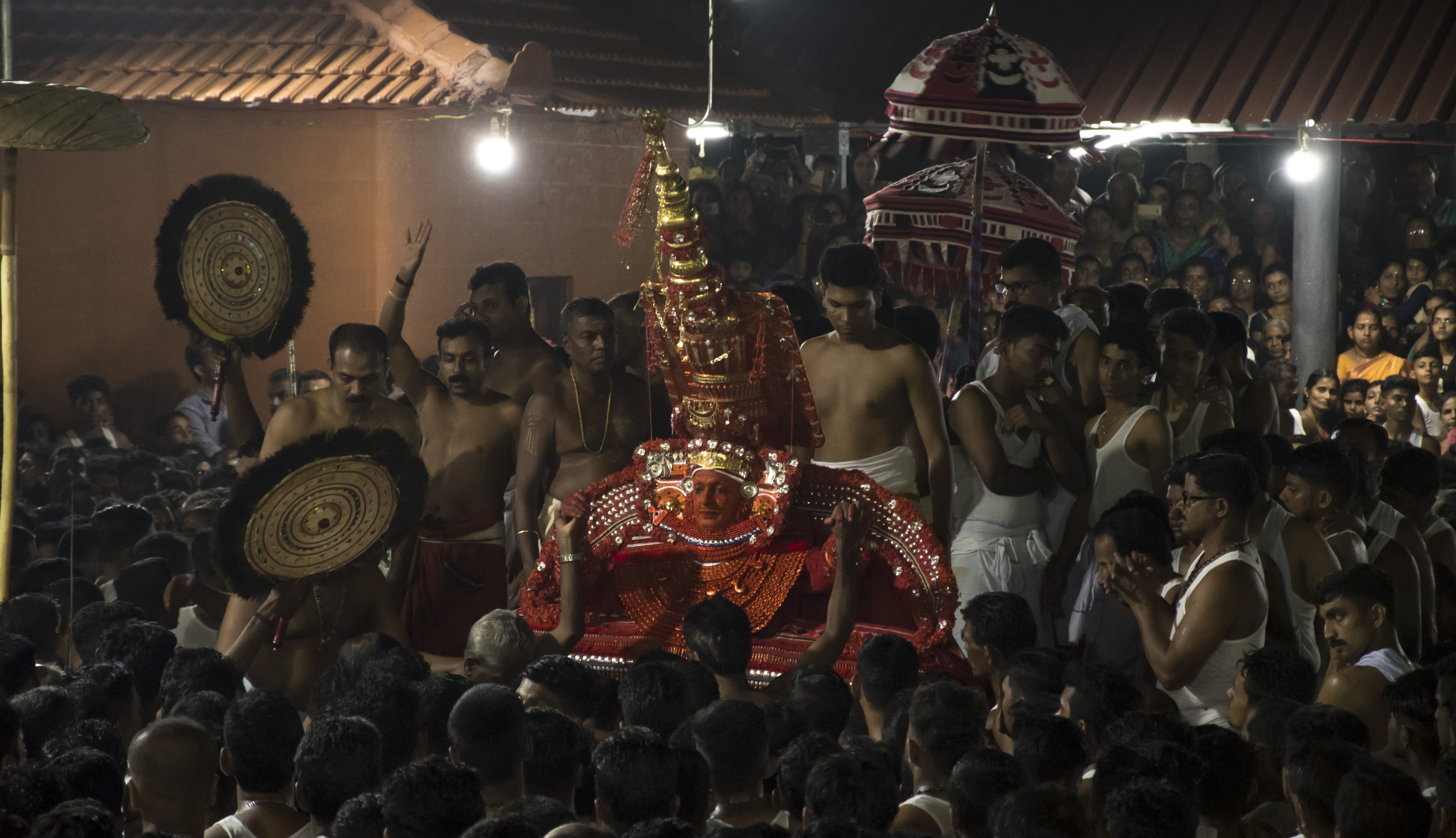
Daivathaar Theyyam as a channel/medium of Lord Rama

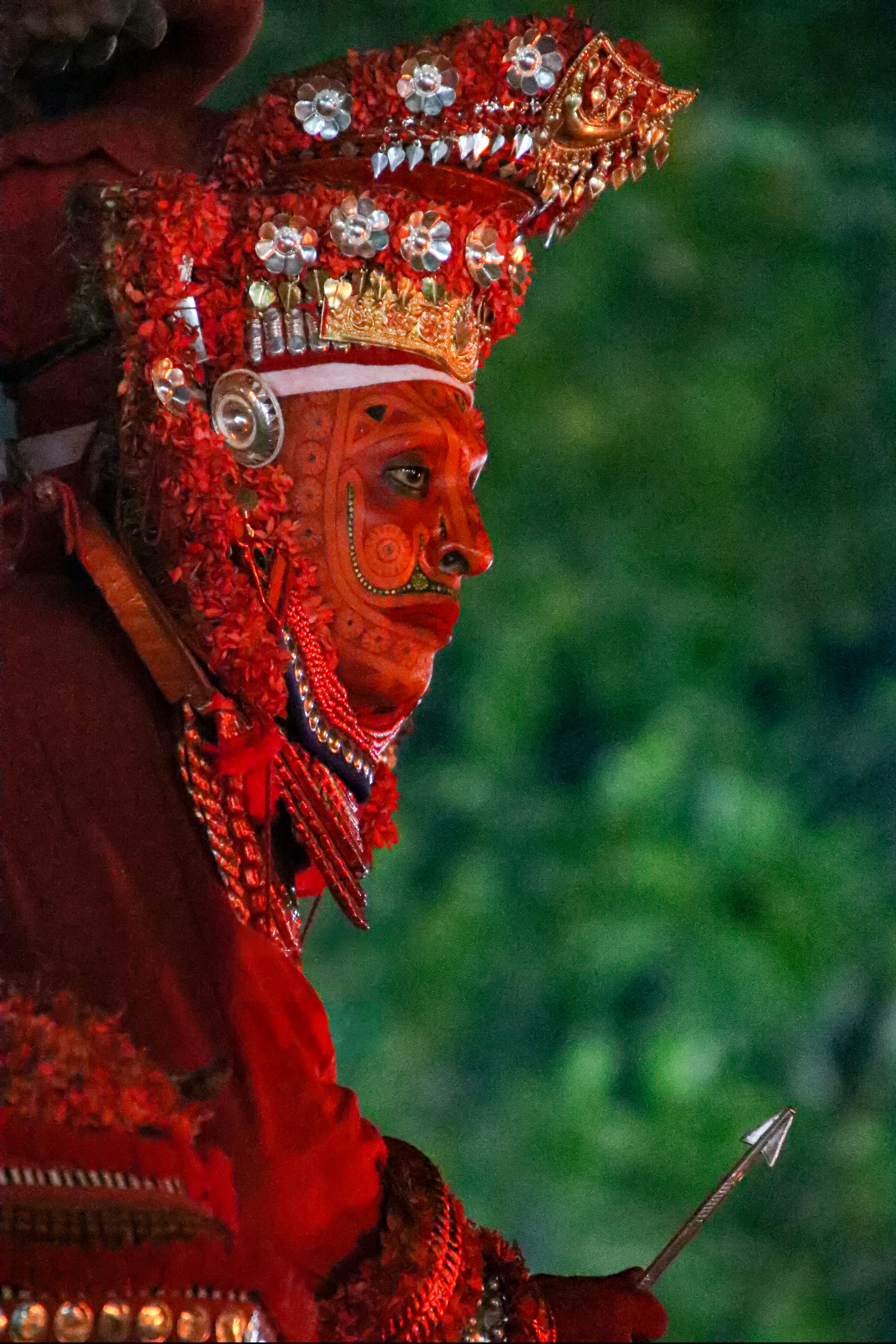
Daivathaar Theyyam Or Lord Rama

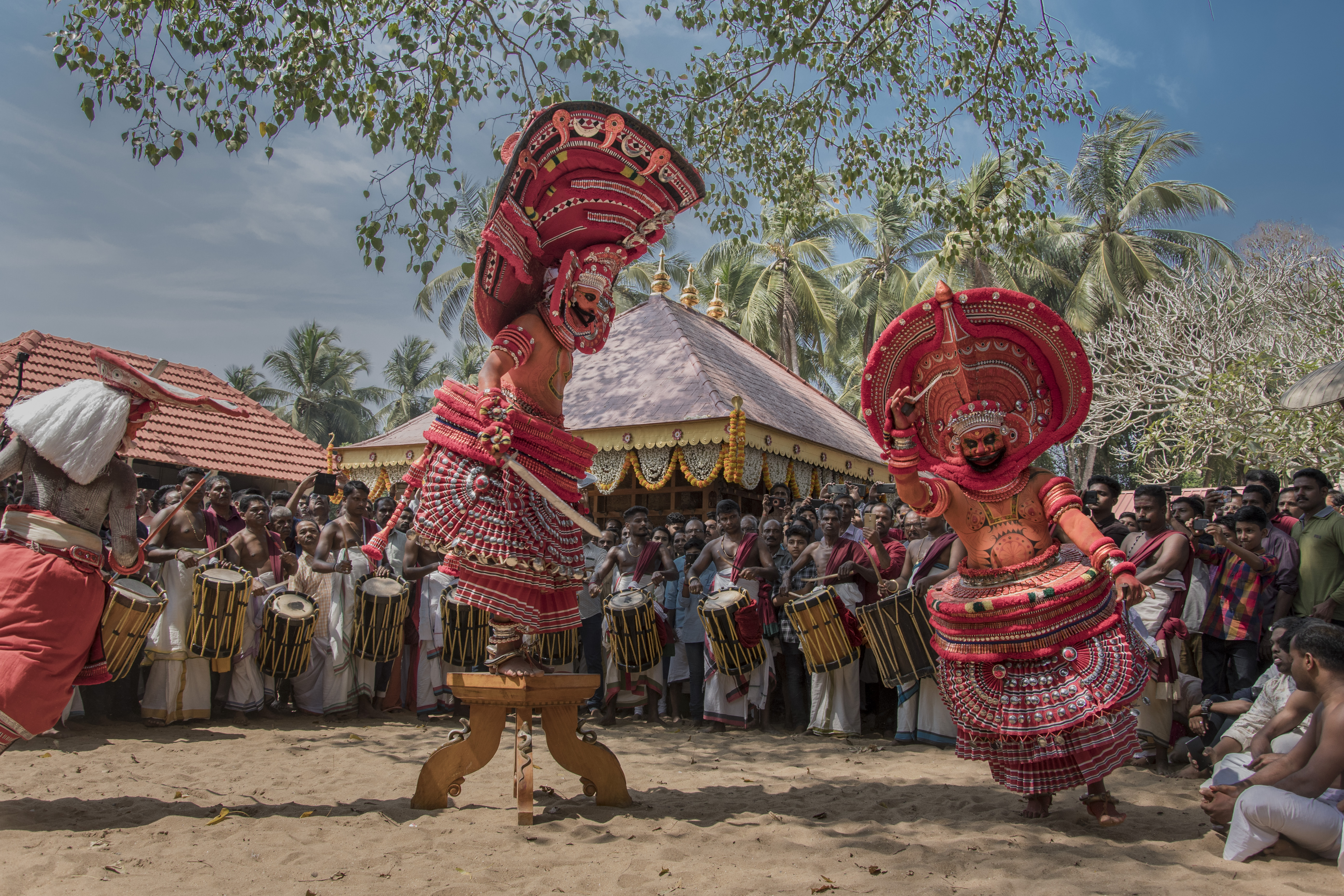
Theyyam depicting bali and sugriva fighting during festival

The annual festival is a wonderful visualisation of devotional unity of a place where people still follow very old and sacred customs throughout the season. It is the time the village gets themselves into a feeling in which they become part of and enjoy the happiness of being part of the glory of Lord Rama. It is the festival where it pictures the great culture merging the normal and common life with great old mythologies. The festival begins in February second week lasting seven days. More than ten theyyams are performed here during the festival. Among them the theyyam named Daivathaar is the most important one. Devotees consider Daivathaar as a channel/medium of Lord Rama.

== Accessibility ==
Nearest Airports:

- Kannur International Airport - 20 km (12 mi)
- Kozhikode International Airport - 100 km (62 mi)
- Mangalore International Airport - 165 km (103 mi)

Nearest Towns / Railway stations :

- Thalassery - 7 km (4.3 mi)
- Kannur - 20 km (12 mi)
- Mangalore - 160 km (99 mi)

== Gallery ==
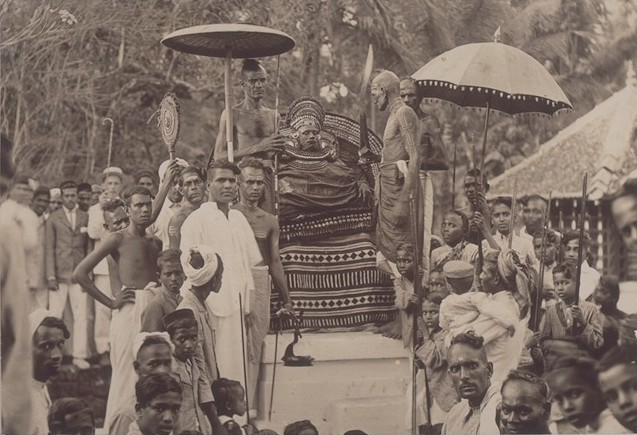
Kanathoor Temple Sree Rama Deivathar with Thiyyar Community Achanmar 1901

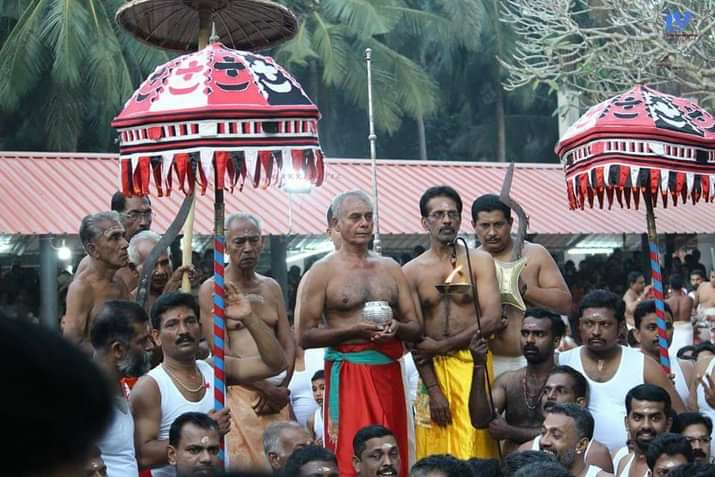
Thiyyar ooralar at andaloor kavu

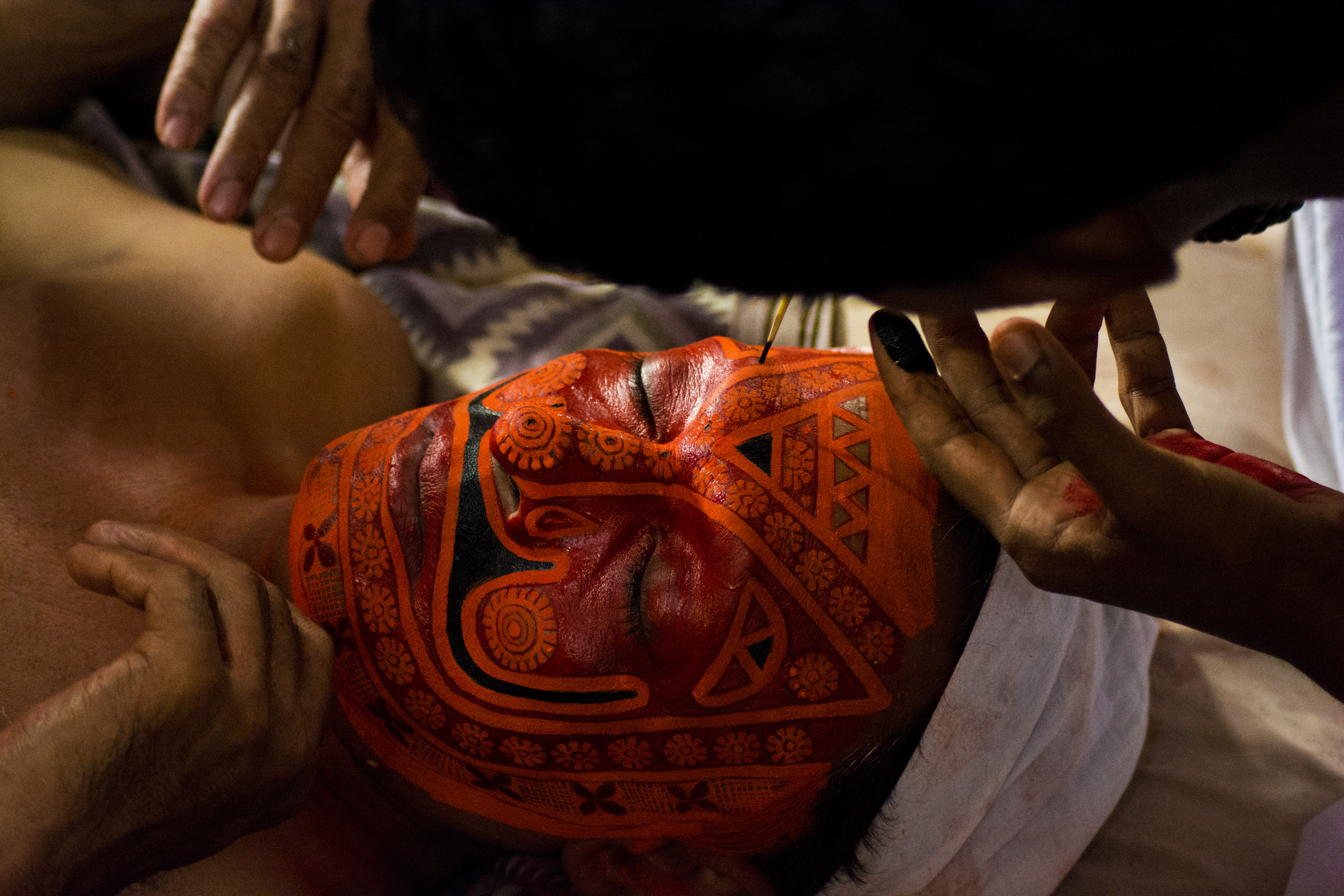
theyyam make up

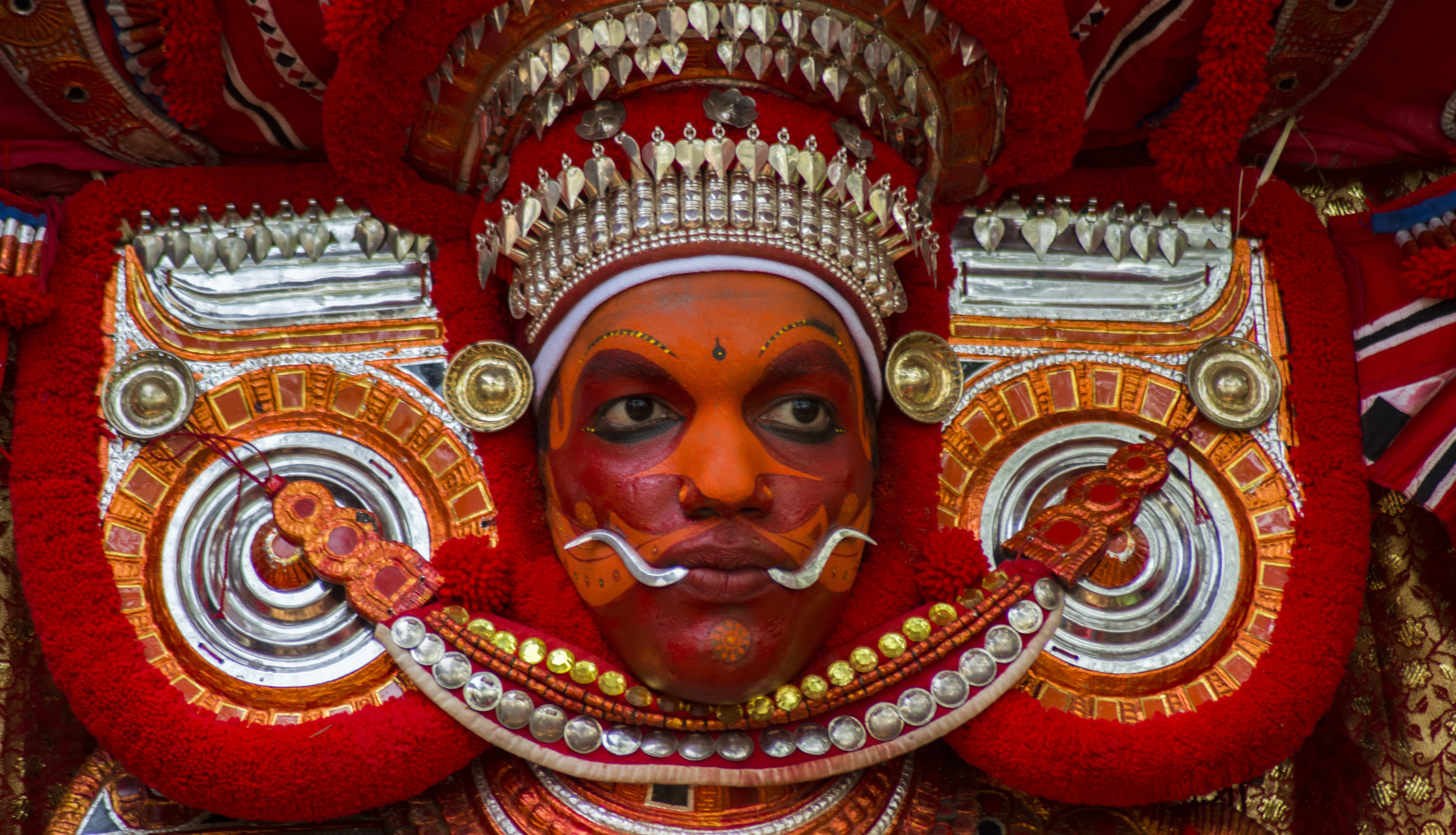
Theyyam

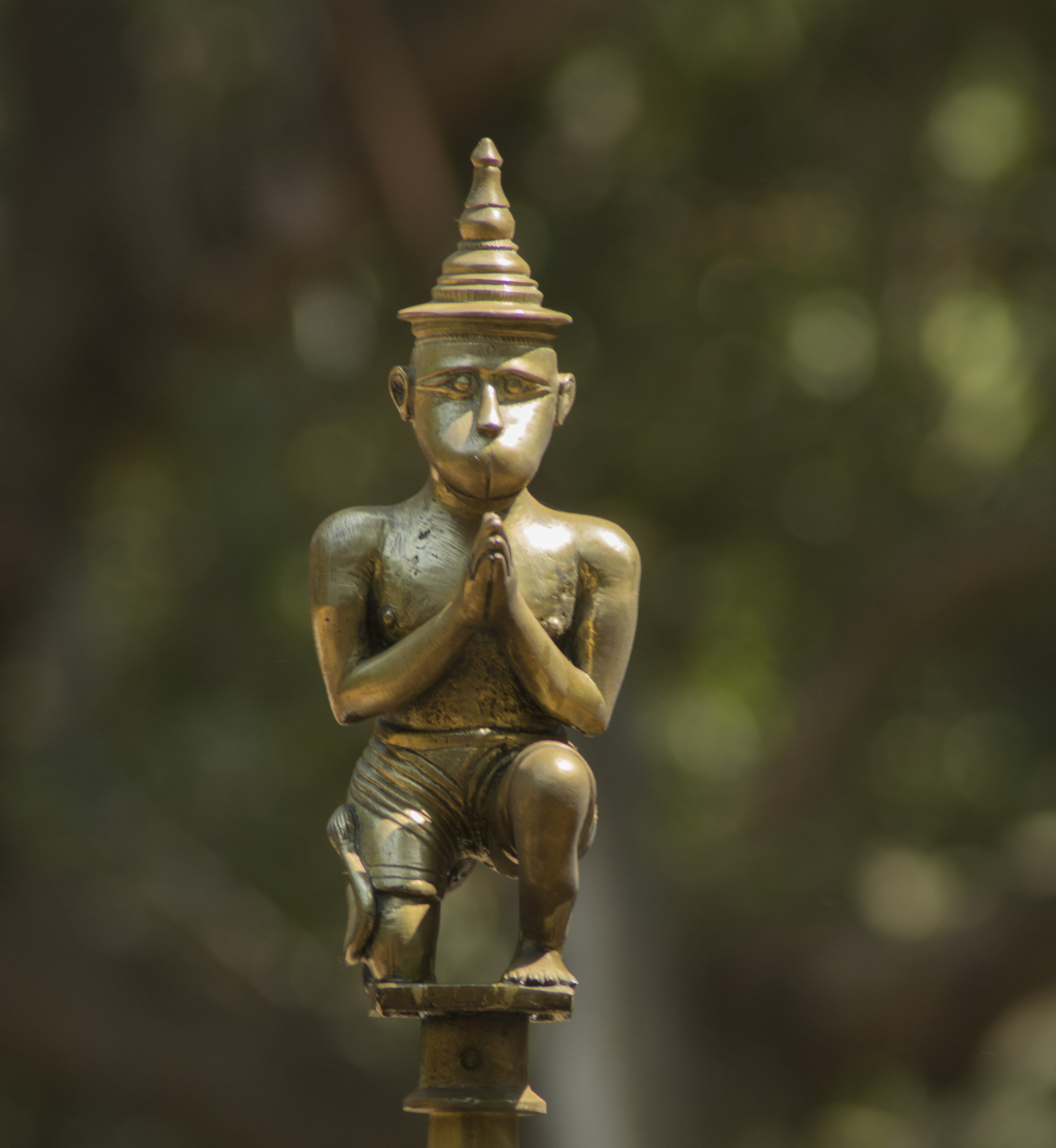
A sculpture of god Hanumaan

== See also ==
- Andalur
- Palayad
- Dharmadam Island
- Temples of Kerala
