= Andaloor =

- village
- Andaloor Kavu
- Country: India
- State: Kerala
- District: Kannur

Languages
  - Official: Malayalam, English
- Time zone: UTC+5:30 (IST)
- PIN: 670661
- Telephone code: 91 (0)490
- ISO 3166 code: IN-KL
- Vehicle registration: KL 58-
- Nearest city: Thalassery
- Lok Sabha constituency: Kannur
- Vidhan Sabha constituency: Thalassery

Andaloor is a place located in Dharmadam village in Thalassery taluk of Kerala state, India. This is the place where Andaloor Kavu is situated. Andaloor is well known for the ancient art form Theyyam.

The Thaze Kavu, part of the Andaloor Kavu, has the remnants of a sacred grove. It is one of the few remaining habitats for the species typical of the Myristica swamps, notably Syzygium travancoricum, an endangered endemic plant. Heavy disturbance in this highly populated area is a threat to the sacred grove.

== See also ==
- Andalurkavu
- Dharmadom
- Kannur
- Mangalore
