= Palayad =

- town
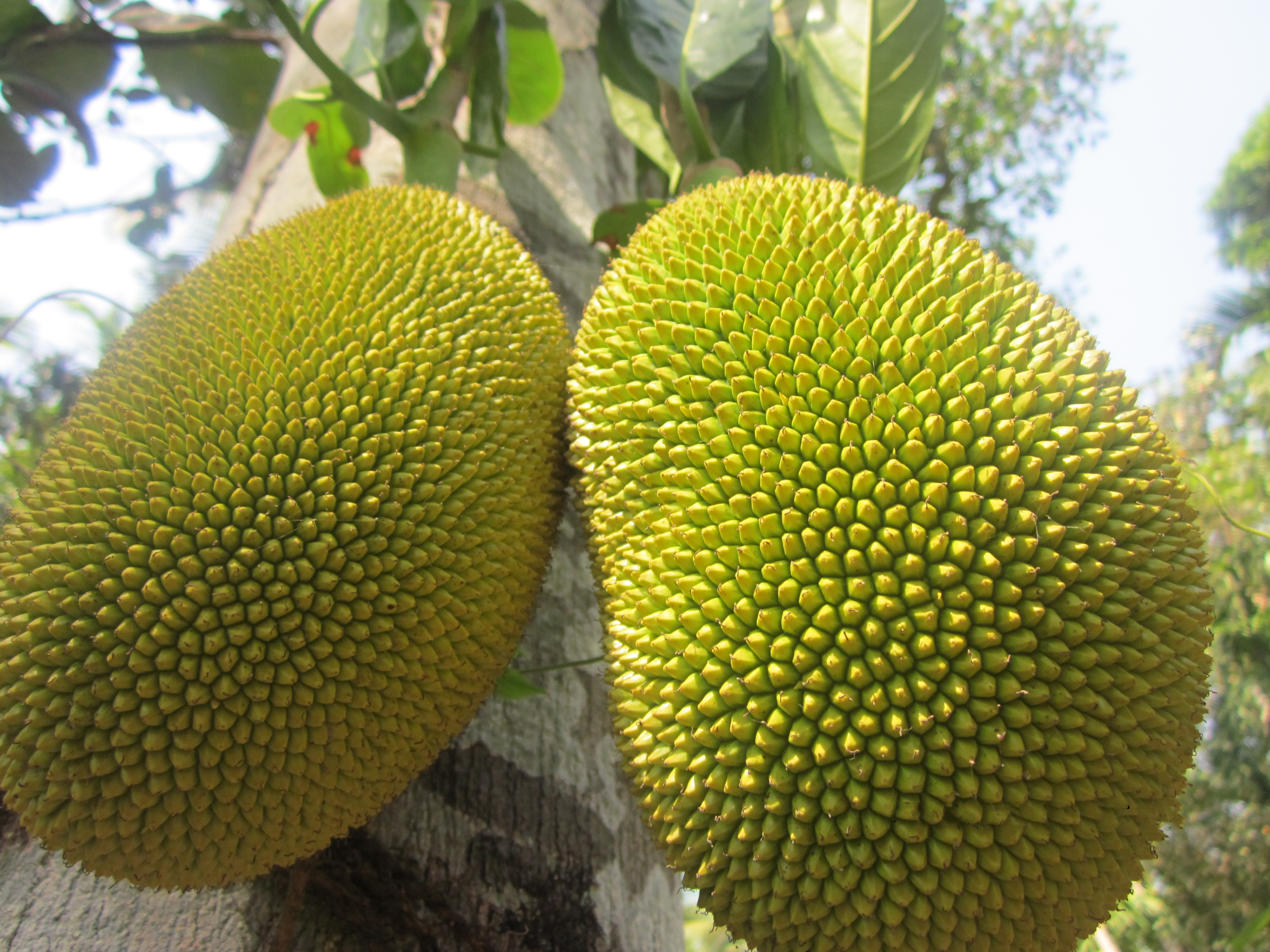
- Jackfruit from Palayad

- Location in Kerala, India Palayad (India)
- Coordinates: 11°47′30″N 75°28′5″E
- Country: India
- State: Kerala
- District: Kannur

Population
  - Total: 16,462

Languages
  - Official: Malayalam, English
- Time zone: UTC+5:30 (IST)
- PIN: 670661
- Telephone code: 91 (0)490
- ISO 3166 code: IN-KL
- Vehicle registration: KL 58-
- Nearest city: Thalassery
- Sex ratio: 1000:1040 ♂/♀
- Literacy: 83%
- Lok Sabha constituency: Kannur
- Vidhan Sabha constituency: Dharmadom

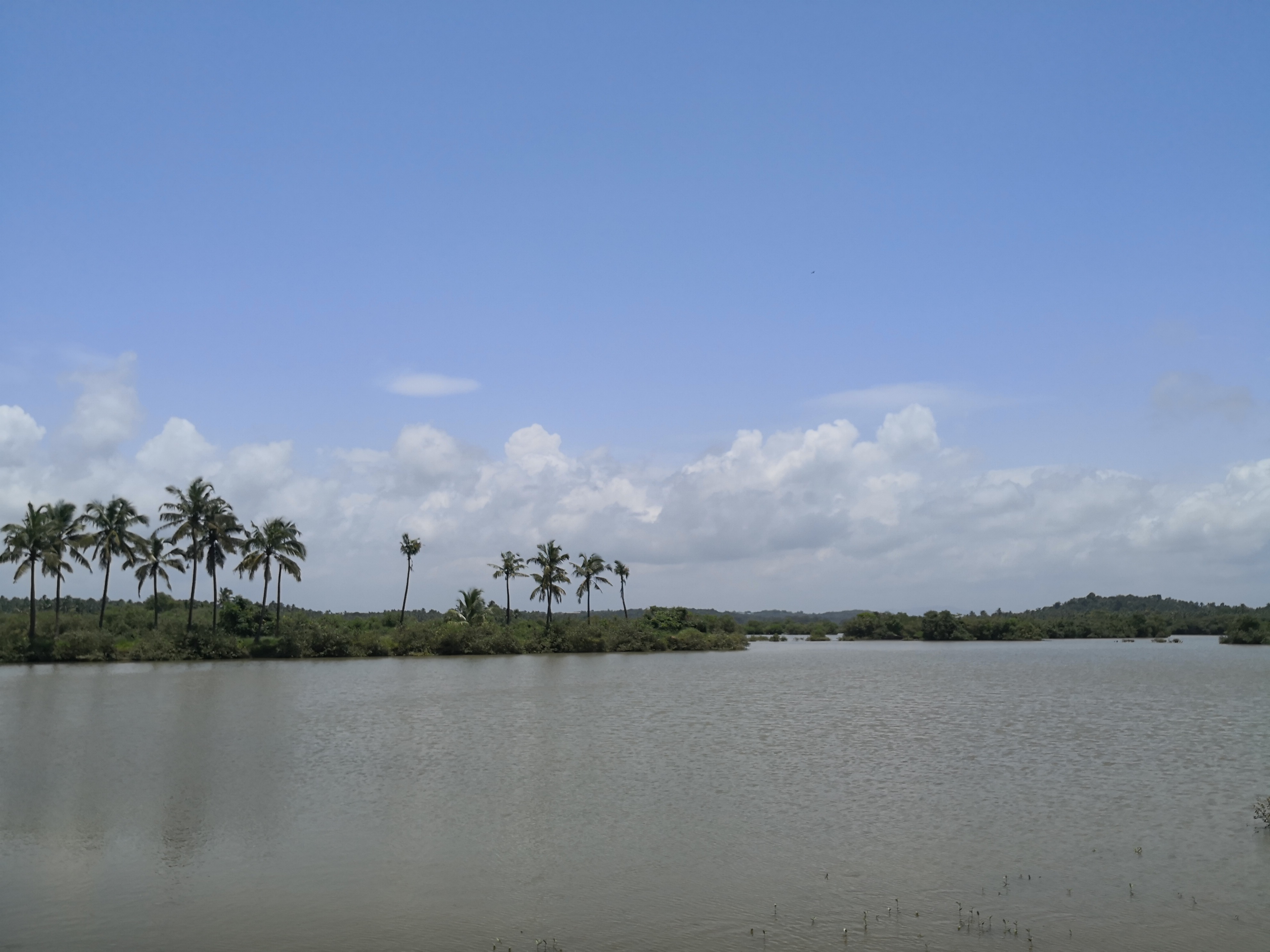
East Palayad -Anjarakkandy River

Palayad is a census town in Thalassery Taluk in the Indian state of Kerala.

== Demographics ==
As of 2001 India census, Palayad had a population of 16,462. Males constitute 49% of the population and females 51%. Palayad has an average literacy rate of 83%, higher than the national average of 59.5%: male literacy is 87%, and female literacy is 79%. In Palayad, 10% of the population is under 6 years of age.

== Educational institutions ==
As part of the National Education Policy (1986), District Institutes for Education and Training (DIETs) were established in selected districts all over India in 1986, along with Kannur DIET in this region. Government Brennen College, founded in 1851, is one of the oldest educational institutions in the region. There is also a Kannur University center located here, which offers postgraduate courses.

Important Educational Institutions in and around Palayad are

- District Institute for Education and Training, Kannur
- Government Higher Secondary School
- Brennen College, Thalassery
- Kannur University, Palayad Campus, Thalassery
- Kendriya Vidyalaya

== University Campus ==
University of Calicut maintained its English and Anthropology departments at Palayad for a long time. When the University of Calicut was bifurcated to form a new Kannur University, Palayad came under the jurisdidiction of Kannur University.

See Also Educational Institutions in Thalassery

== Transportation ==
The national highway passes through Dharmadam town. Mangalore, Goa and Mumbai can be accessed on the northern side and Cochin and Thiruvananthapuram can be accessed on the southern side. The nearest railway stations are Dharmadam and Thalassery on Mangalore-Palakkad line. Trains are available to almost all parts of India subject to advance booking over the internet. There are airports at Kannur, Mangalore and Calicut. All of them are international airports but direct flights are available only to Middle Eastern countries.
