= List of educational institutions in Thalassery =

This is a list of educational institutions in Thalassery, a city on the Malabar Coast of Kerala, India.

== Schools ==
- MMHSS(MUBARAK) SAIDARPALLY
- Basel Evangelical Mission Parsi High School
- Sacred Heart Girls' High School
- St.Joseph's Higher Secondary School
- GVHSS Chirakkara
- Govt Brennan HSS
- Govt Girls HSS
- GGHSS Thiruvangad
- GVHSS Koduvally
- GVHSS Kadirur
- Bright English School
- AKG Memorial GHSS
- RVHSS Chokli

== Colleges ==
- Govt Brennen College
- College of Engineering, Thalassery
- Nettur Technical Training Foundation
- Thalassery Govt College, Chokli
- Thalassery Nursing College
- Malabar Cancer Center

== Universities ==
- Kannur University campus, Palayad, Thalassery City

== See also ==
- List of schools in India
