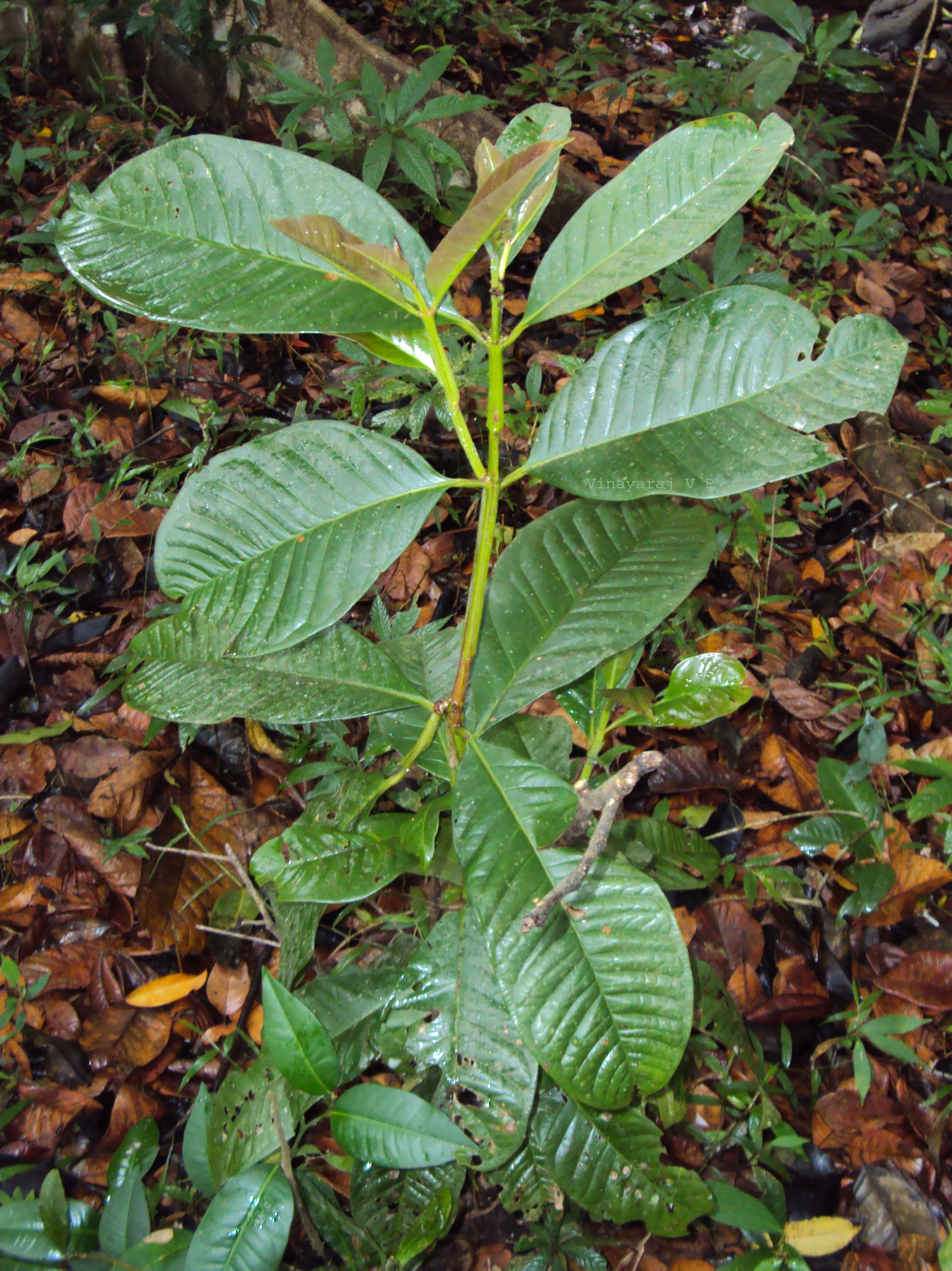

Conservation status
- Vulnerable (IUCN 3.1)

Scientific classification
- Kingdom: Plantae
- Clade: Tracheophytes
- Clade: Angiosperms
- Clade: Eudicots
- Clade: Rosids
- Order: Myrtales
- Family: Myrtaceae
- Genus: Syzygium
- Species: S. stocksii

Binomial name
- Syzygium stocksii (Duthie) Gamble

Synonyms
- Eugenia stocksii Duthie; Syzygium travancoricum Gamble

= Syzygium stocksii =

Species of flowering plant

Syzygium stocksii is a species of plant in the family Myrtaceae. It is a tree endemic to the Western Ghats of western and southern India. It grows up to 15 metres tall in evergreen and semi-evergreen moist forests, often on hillocks or swampy areas, from 50 to 800 metres elevation. Associated species include Terminalia paniculata, Hopea indica, Calamus thwaitesii, Lagerstroemia floribunda, Hydnocarpus macrocarpus, Aporosa cardiosperma, Syzygium cumini, Ficus hispida, Litsea coriacea, and Sterculia guttata.

It is threatened with habitat loss, fragmentation, and degradation from soil erosion and siltation and expansion of plantations, urban areas, roads, and industry. The IUCN Red List assesses the species as Vulnerable.
