= Green Island =

Green Island or Greene Island can refer to:

== Places ==
=== Africa ===
- Green Island (Egypt), in the Gulf of Suez
- Green Island (Eritrea), in the Red Sea (Gulf of Zula)

=== Antarctica ===
- Green Island (Berthelot Islands)

=== Asia ===
- Green Island, Hong Kong
- Green Island, Taiwan
- Green Island (Kerala), India
- Green Island (Kuwait)
- Qingdao, China
- Ilha Verde, Macau

=== Europe ===
==== United Kingdom ====
- Green Island, Scotland, Enard Bay, Scotland
- Green Island (Dorset), Poole Harbour, Dorset, England
- Green Island, Isles of Scilly, Cornwall, England
- Green Island, Jersey, Jersey, Channel Islands
- Greenisland, County Antrim, Northern Ireland
- Green Island, County Down, a townland in County Down, Northern Ireland

=== North America ===
- Greenland

==== Canada ====
- Green Island (Catalina), Newfoundland and Labrador
- Green Island (Fortune), Newfoundland and Labrador
- Green Island (Rideau River), Ontario
- Green Island (Severn Sound), in Severn Sound, Ontario
- Green Island (Ottawa River), in Ontario
- Greene Island (Lake Ontario), in Ontario
- Greene Island (Lake Huron), in Ontario
- Green Island, one of the Tusket Islands in Nova Scotia

==== Caribbean ====
- Green Island (Antigua and Barbuda), off the east coast of Antigua
- Green Island, Jamaica
- Green Island, Saba, an islet off the north coast of Saba, Netherlands

==== United States ====
- Green Island, Uganik Bay, Alaska
- Green Island, Aleutian Islands, Alaska
- Green Island (California), in the Napa River near San Pablo Bay
- Green Island, Chugach National Forest, Alaska
- Green Island, Hawaii, part of Kure Atoll
- Green Island (Massachusetts), in Boston Outer Harbor, Massachusetts
- Green Island (Michigan), in Lake Michigan
- Green Island, Nebraska
- Green Island, New York, a village
- Green Island Bridge, New York
- Green Island, Iowa
- Green Island (Conchas Lake), in Conchas Lake, New Mexico
- Green Island (Ohio), Lake Erie
- Green Island (Wisconsin), Green Bay, Wisconsin
- Greene Island (Rhode Island), Rhode Island

=== Oceania ===
==== Australia ====
- Green Island (Queensland)
- Green Island National Park, Queensland
- Green Island (New South Wales)
- Green Island (Tasmania)
- Green Island (Western Australia), in Oyster Harbour, King George Sound

==== New Zealand ====
- Green Island (Okaihe), Dunedin
- Green Island, New Zealand, a suburb of Dunedin
- Green Island (Foveaux Strait), a small island off the coast of Ruapuke Island

==== Papua New Guinea ====
- Green Islands (Papua New Guinea)
- Green Island, Papua New Guinea, alternate name for Nissan Island, the largest of the Green Islands

== Other ==
- "Green Island" (also known as The Island), a song by Ewan MacColl on his album Naming of Names
- Green Island Cement, a Hong Kong company
- Green Island FC, a football club in Green Island, New Zealand
- Green Island (novel), a novel by Shawna Yang Ryan published in 2016

== See also ==
- Big Green Island, Tasmania
- Buller, Whittell and Green Islands Nature Reserve, a protected area of Western Australia
- List of islands called Green Holm
- Greenly Island (disambiguation), a number of different islands
- Gruney (disambiguation)
- Île Verte (disambiguation), French for "Green Island"
- Verde Island, Portuguese for "Green Island"
- Ilha Verde, formerly Verde or Green Island, now a neighborhood of Macao
- Island Green, area of Wrexham, Wales
- Sabuj Dwip, fictional island in the 1979 Indian film Sabuj Dwiper Raja (lit. 'Green Island King')
