= Gruney (disambiguation) =

Gruney or Grunay is the name of several Shetland Islands. It derives from the Old Norse for "green island".

== Usual uses ==
- Gruney off Northmavine
- Grunay, in the Out Skerries

== Other uses ==
- Gruna off Vementry
- Gruney, one of the Ramna Stacks, a special protection area for birds
- Haaf Gruney by Unst
- Sound Gruney by Unst

== See also ==
- List of islands called Green Holm
- Green Island (disambiguation)
- Green Isle (disambiguation)
- Greena
