= List of islands called Green Holm =

Green Holm is the name of several islands.

== Orkney ==
- Muckle Green Holm off Eday
  - Little Green Holm beside the former

== Shetland ==
- Green Holm, (HU382379), is a small uninhabited island 0.5 km north of Burra Ness
- Green Holm, Gletness, in the Isles of Gletness off south east, Mainland, Shetland (also a "Green Isle" in this group)
- Green Holm, Vementry off Vementry

== See also ==
- Gruney (disambiguation)
- Grunay
- Green Island (disambiguation)
- Green Isle (disambiguation)
- Greena
