= Haaf Gruney =

Small island in the north east of the Shetland Islands

Coordinates: 60°39′48″N 0°50′12″W

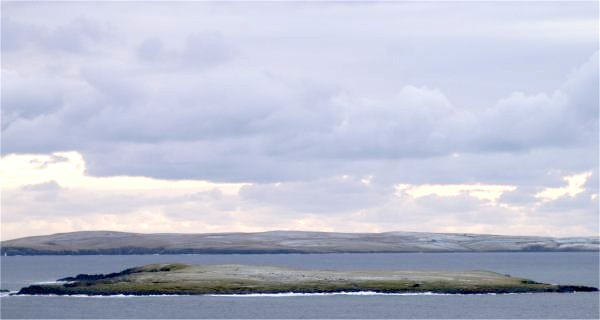
Haaf Gruney from Unst

Haaf Gruney is a small island in the north east of the Shetland Islands.

== Geography and geology ==
The island is between Unst and Fetlar which are to the north and south respectively. Between it and Yell are a mini-archipelago of small islands including Linga, Sound Gruney, Urie Lingey, Daaey and Wedder Holm. Uyea is also to the west.

There was formerly a chromite mine.

== History ==
=== Name ===
The island's name is a corruption of the Norse hafgröney, gröney meaning "green island", and "ha(a)f" being an old word (still in some use in Shetland), meaning deep open water, especially that used for fishing. "Haaf" is added to distinguish it from other islands, such as Sound Gruney nearby.

=== A voyage to Karmøy ===
On August 4, 1745, two girls from Uyea rowed here to milk some of the cows grazing here. Unfortunately, their return was marred by a strong storm, and eventually they found their tiny boat blown to Karmøy in south west Norway. The Uyea girls ended up marrying Karmøy men, and their descendants still live there.

=== Literary References ===
Haaf Gruney is used as a setting in the 2014 novel The Sixteen Trees of the Somme (Svøm med dem som drukner) by Norwegian author Lars Mytting.

== Wildlife ==
Haaf Gruney is a national nature reserve for the storm petrels which breed there. Mousa in the southern Shetland islands also has a strong colony.

The islet is no longer used for grazing, but there are marine Eurasian otters living here, and the usual seals.

== See also ==
- List of islands of Scotland
