= Sound Gruney =

One of the Shetland islands

Coordinates: 60°39′N 0°56′W

For other islands with similar names, see Gruney (disambiguation)

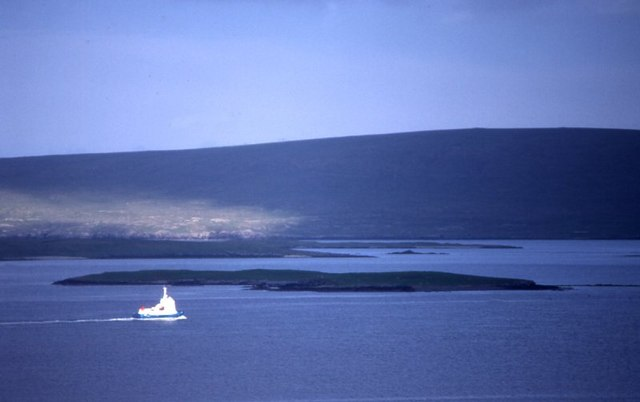
Sound Gruney from Yell, with the Fetlar ferry in the foreground and Urie Lingey and Vord Hill, Fetlar beyond

Sound Gruney is one of the Shetland islands. It lies about 1.5 kilometres (0.93 mi) north of Hamars Ness on Fetlar, south of Unst, and to the east of Yell.

== Geography ==
Gruney means a "green island", and "sound" refers to the strait. Sound Gruney's maximum elevation is about 9 metres (30 ft) above sea level.

Daaey is to the south east, and Urie Lingey to the east. The latter is 1 km north of Urie Ness on Fetlar, hence the name. Wedder Holm, south of Uyea, is to the north east.
