= Greenly Island =

Greenly Island can refer to:

- Greenly Island (South Australia), an island off the coast of the Eyre Peninsula in Australia
  - Greenly Island Conservation Park, includes the above island
- Greenly Island, Canada, an island in Quebec, Canada

== See also ==
- Greenly
- Green Island
