= Muzhappilangad =

- Census Town
- Location in Kerala, India Muzhappilangad (India)
- Coordinates: 11°48′0″N 75°27′0″E
- Country: India
- State: Kerala
- District: Kannur
- Panchayat: 1954

Government
  - Type: Panchayat Raj
  - Body: Muzhappilangad Grama Panchayat
  - Panchayat President: Sajitha. T CPI(M)

Area
  - Total: 7.19 km^{2} (2.78 sq mi)

Population (2011)
  - Total: 23,709
  - Density: 3,300/km^{2} (8,540/sq mi)

Languages
  - Official: Malayalam, English
- Time zone: UTC+5:30 (IST)
- Postal code: 670662
- ISO 3166 code: IN-KL
- Vehicle registration: KL-13

Muzhappilangad (മുഴപ്പിലങ്ങാട്) is a coastal census town and grama panchayat in the Kannur district of the Indian state of Kerala. It is a suburb of Kannur city.

== Access ==
The nearest major towns to Muzhappilangad are Thalassery and Kannur located about 8 km (5.0 mi) and 14 km (8.7 mi) away respectively.

== Festivals ==
Muzhappilangad is famous for Thalappoli, a three-day ritual celebrated in March at the Sree Koormba Temple.

== Demographics ==
As of 2001 India census, Muzhappilangad had a population of 23,709. Males constitute 47% of the population and females 53%. Muzhappilangad has an average literacy rate of 83%, higher than the national average of 59.5%: male literacy is 84%, and female literacy is 83%. In Muzhappilangad, 12% of the population is under 6 years of age.

== See also ==
- Muzhappilangad Beach
- Thalassery
- Dharmadam
- Dharmadam Island
