= Île Verte =

There are several places called Île Verte (French for "Green Island"):

- Île Verte (Finistère), France
- Île Verte (Grenoble), France
- Île Verte (Bas-Saint-Laurent), Quebec, Canada
- the French name for Green Island (Fortune), Newfoundland and Labrador
- Île Verte (Îles Laval), part of Îles Laval
- Île Verte (Kerguelen Islands)
- Île Verte (Mayotte)
