= Muzhappilangad Beach =

Drive-in beach in Tellichery ,North Malabar, India

Muzhappilangad Beach, Thalassery
- Beach
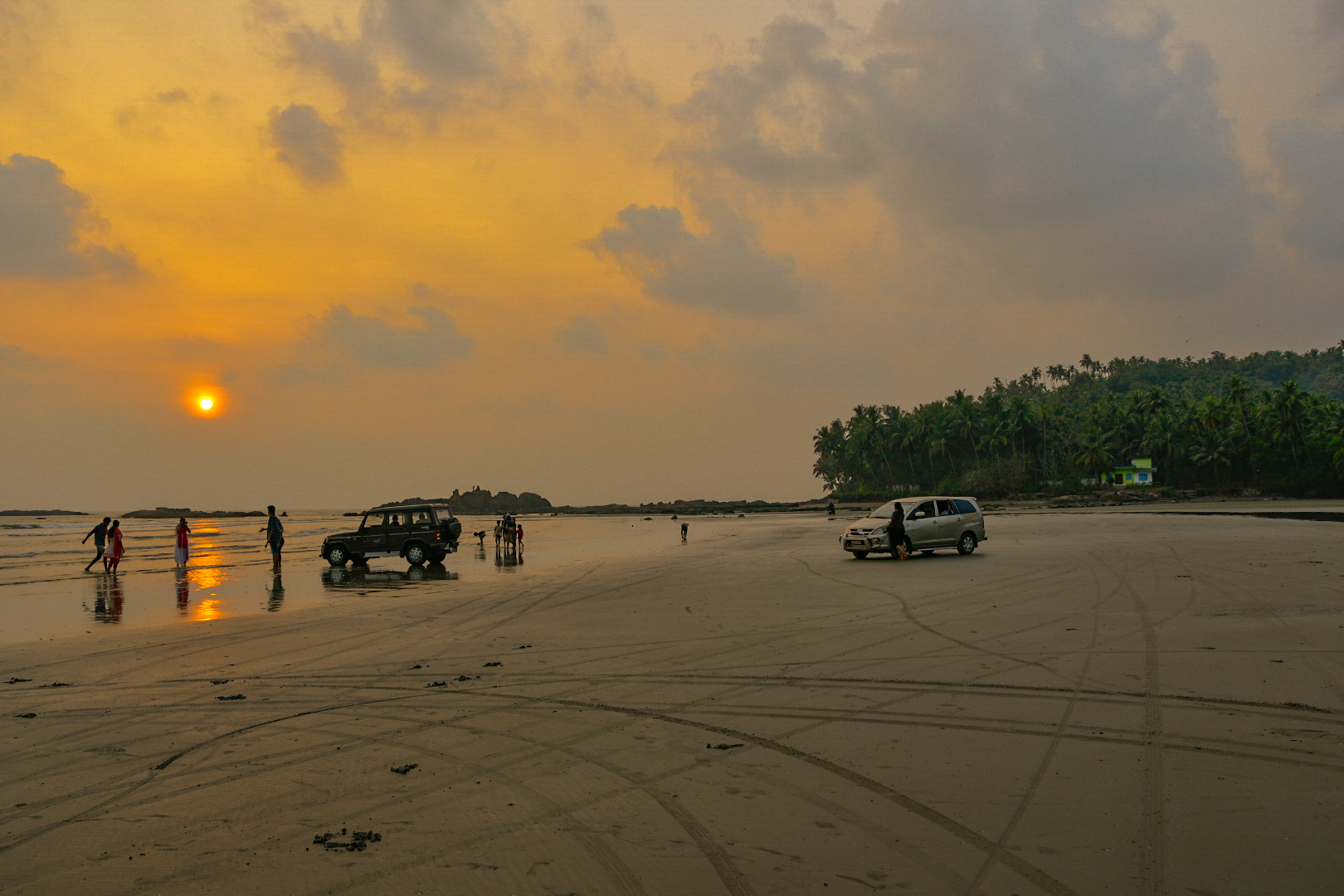
- Muzhappilangad Beach

- Location within Kerala Location within India
- Coordinates: 11°47′46.3596″N 75°26′31.308″E
- Location: Muzhappilangad, Tellichery, India

Dimensions
  - Length: 3.8 km (2.4 mi)
- Patrolled by: Lifeguards
- Hazard rating: Low

Muzhappilangad Beach is a drive-in beach in Tellichery Kannur district of Kerala, on the Malabar Coast of India. It is 4 kilometers in length. In 2016, it was featured among the six best beaches for driving by BBC Autos. Vehicles can be driven along a 4-kilometer stretch of this coastline. The beach runs parallel to National Highway 66 (formerly NH 17), located between Kannur and Thalassery, approximately 7 kilometers away from Thalassery in the Kannur district. Muzhappilangad Beach is the only beach in Kerala where vehicles can be driven safely along the shore and is recognized as the longest drive-in beach in Asia.

== Overview ==
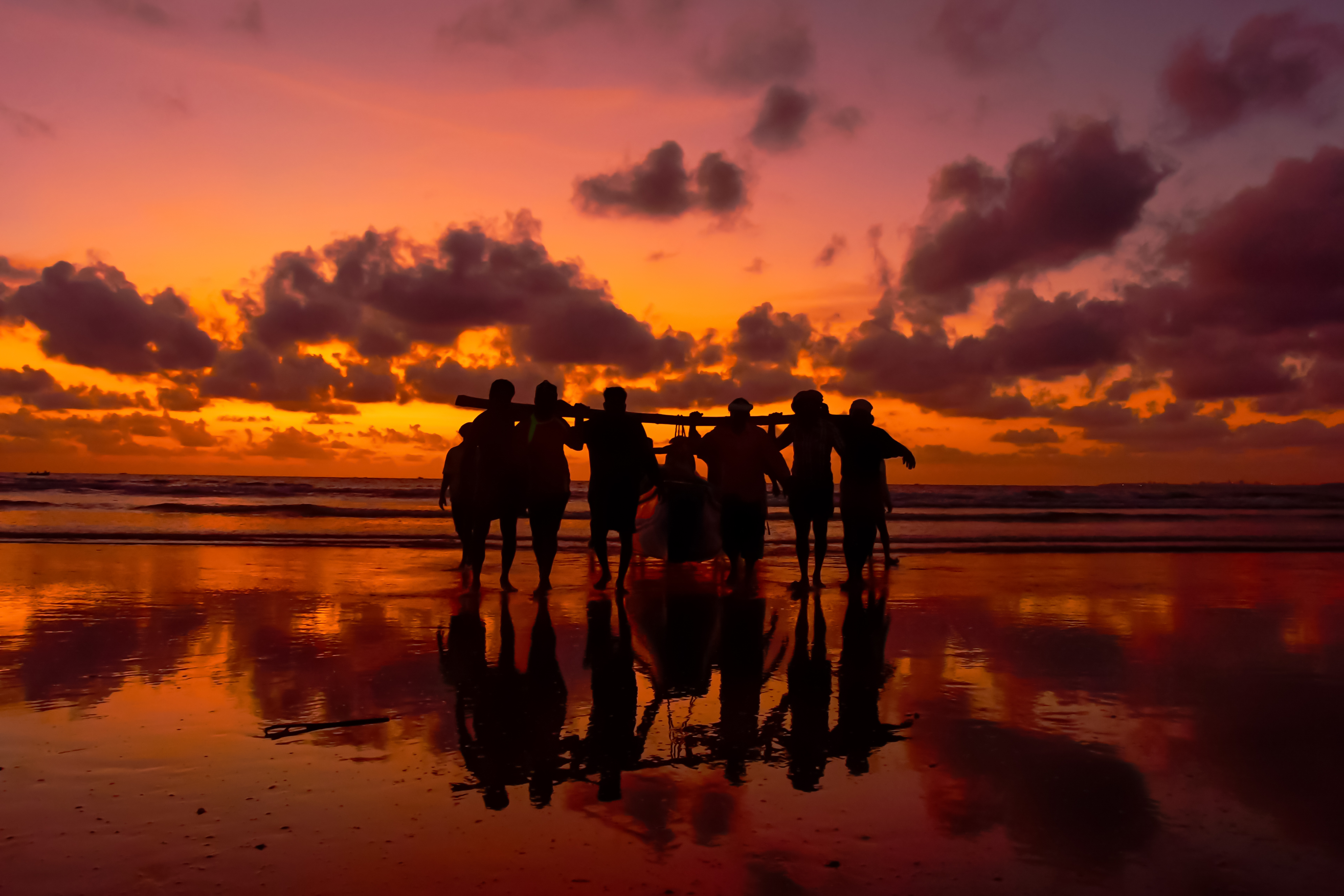
Fishermen at work on the beach

The Muzhapilangad beach is located parallel to National Highway 66 (formerly National Highway 17) between Kannur and Thalassery. There is an unpaved road winding through coconut groves leading to the beach. The beach is about 3.8 km long and curves in a wide area providing a good view of Kannur on the north. Local laws allow beachgoers to drive for a full 3.4 km directly on the sands of the beach. The beach is bordered by black rocks, which also protect it from the strong currents of the ocean.

These rocks provide habitat for blue mussels. The beach attracts bird-watchers from far off places as hundreds of birds flock here during various seasons.

There is a private island called Dharmadam Island (Pacha Thuruthu in Malayalam, 'Green Island'), approximately 100–200 m south of the beach. It is possible to walk to the island during low tide from the nearby Dharmadam beach.

== Tourism ==
Since the late 1990s, the beach has seen a steady influx of European and other foreign tourists during winter. After the facelift of the beach there has been a huge improvement in the facilities available to the beach visitors. The beach is wide and the sand is firm enough to support smooth driving. Naturally occurring black rock formations along the coastline shield the beach from strong ocean currents, making it a popular spot for swimming. The shallow waters allow visitors to enter the sea safely. The beach is bordered by estuaries on both ends: the Anjarakandi River to the south and the Ayyarakath Thodu to the north. During low tide, the beach reaches an average width of about 60 meters, whereas high tide completely submerges the shore. While driving through shallow water is possible, leaving a stationary vehicle parked on wet sand causes its tires to sink. A 1.3-kilometer-long walkway has been constructed along the northern section. During the peak season, the beach receives an average daily inflow of around 2,000 vehicles and 8,000 visitors. A five star resort and several resorts and cafeterias operate nearby.

== Fishing Activities ==
Although primarily a tourist destination, the beach also supports active fishing activities. Small and medium-sized traditional fishing craft are typically lined up at both ends of the beach. Fishermen are generally most active during the early morning and after twilight.

Harvesting blue mussels which are abundant along the rocky sections to the south, serves as a key source of local livelihood. In the evenings, dishes prepared with blue mussels are a major attraction at cafeterias scattered across the beach. Local fishermen also offer visitors opportunities to ride on their fishing craft in the sea.

== Birdwatching hotspot ==
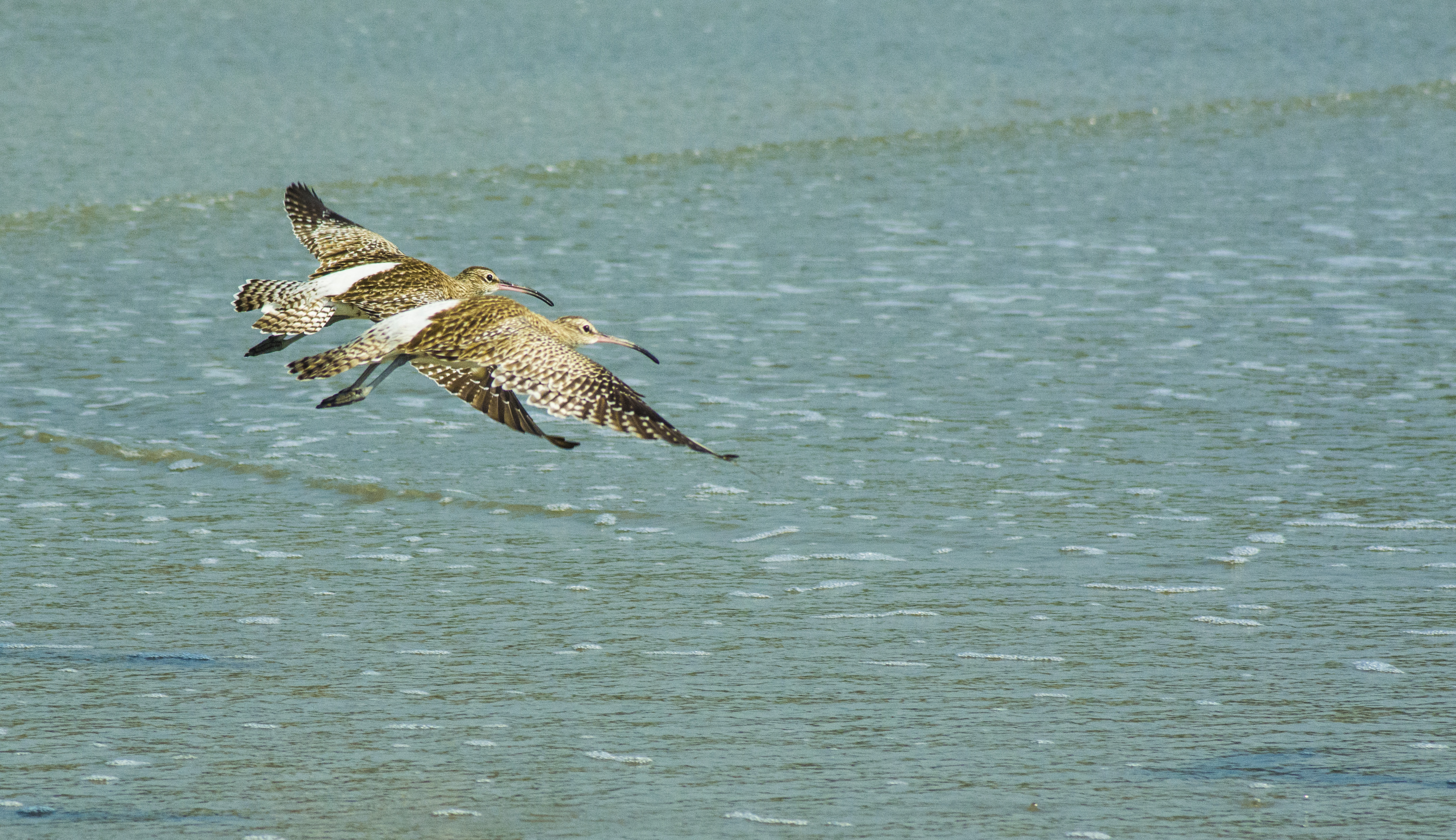
Whimbrel at Muzhappilangad Beach

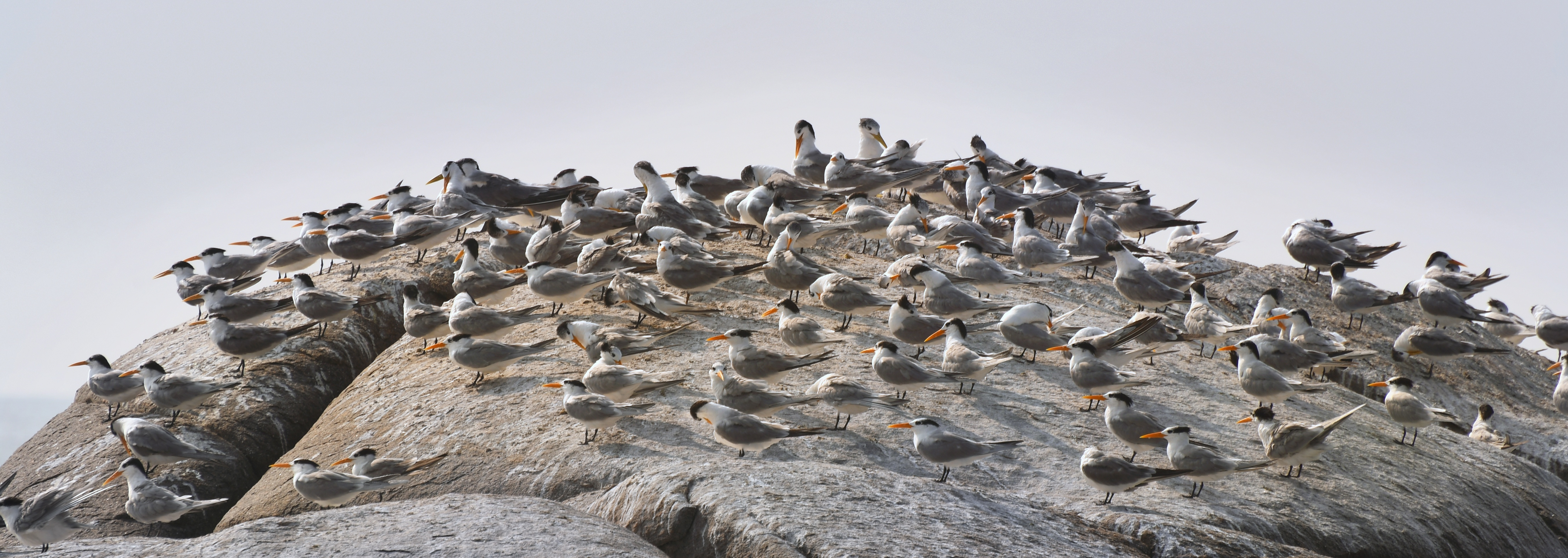
Lesser crested terns

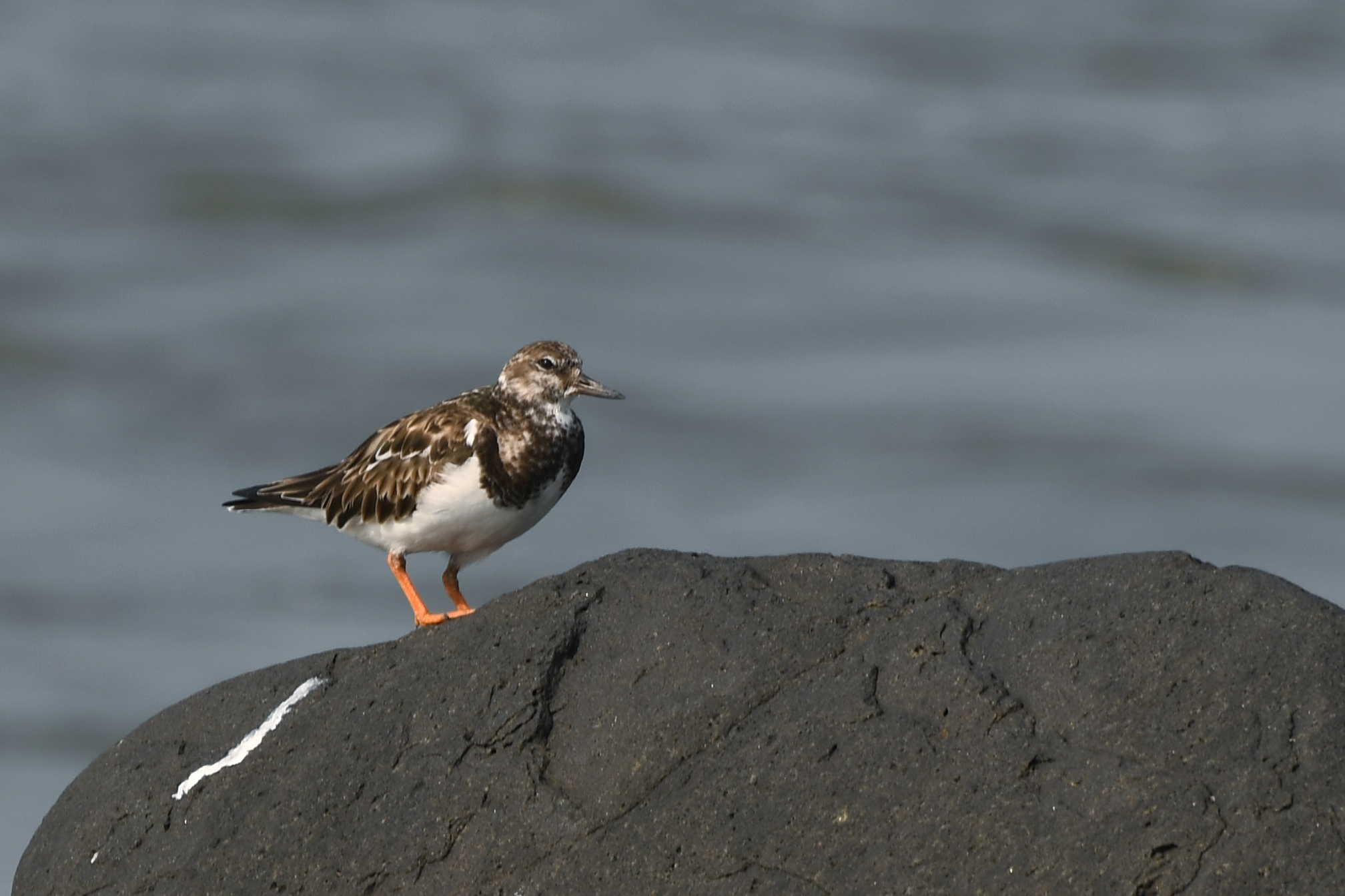
Ruddy turnstone

More than thirty species of migratory birds visit the beach in the winter. Among them were the pectoral sandpiper and Caspian plover, sighted in 2013, which were reported for the first time in Kerala. Long, broad shore and rocky formations on the side of the beach provide a safe place for migrating birds.

=== Species ===
- Asian openbill
- Black kite
- Black-winged stilt
- Brahminy kite
- Common greenshank
- Common redshank
- Egret
- Eurasian curlew
- Eurasian oystercatcher
- Eurasian whimbrel
- Gull
- Little stint
- Plover
- Ruddy turnstone
- Ruff
- Sanderling
- Sandpiper
- Tern
- White bellied sea eagle

== Accessibility ==
Nearest airports:

- Kannur International Airport: 27 km (17 mi)
- Karipur International Airport: 106 km (66 mi)

Nearest towns/railway stations:

- Edakkad Railway Station: 2 km (1.2 mi)
- Thalassery: 7 km (4.3 mi)
- Kannur: 15 km (9.3 mi)
- Mangalore railway station: 151 km (94 mi)

By road:

On National Highway 66 the beach is situated between Kannur town and Thalassery town. There are five village connection roads from the National Highway towards the beach.

== Image gallery ==
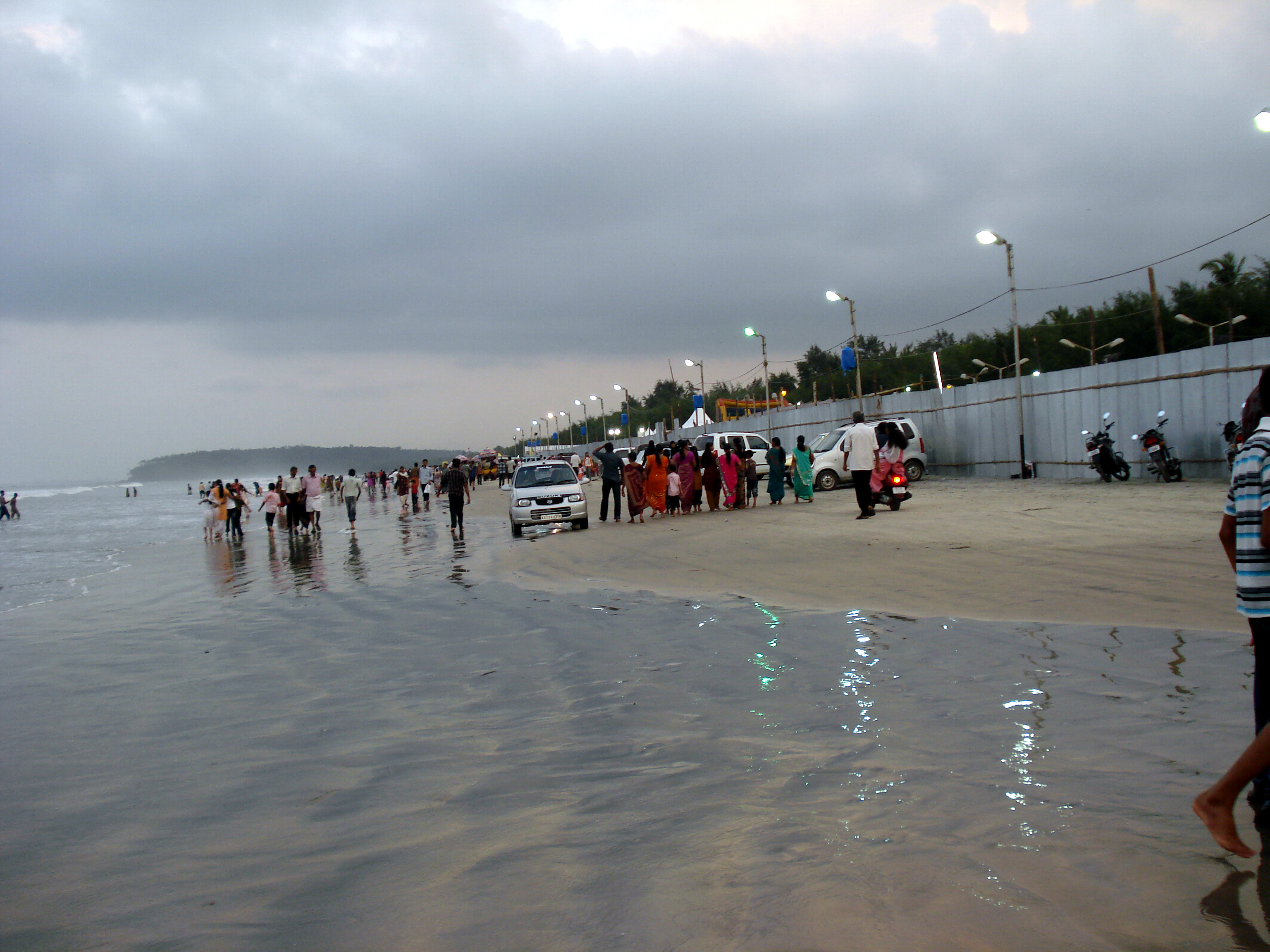
Beach festival

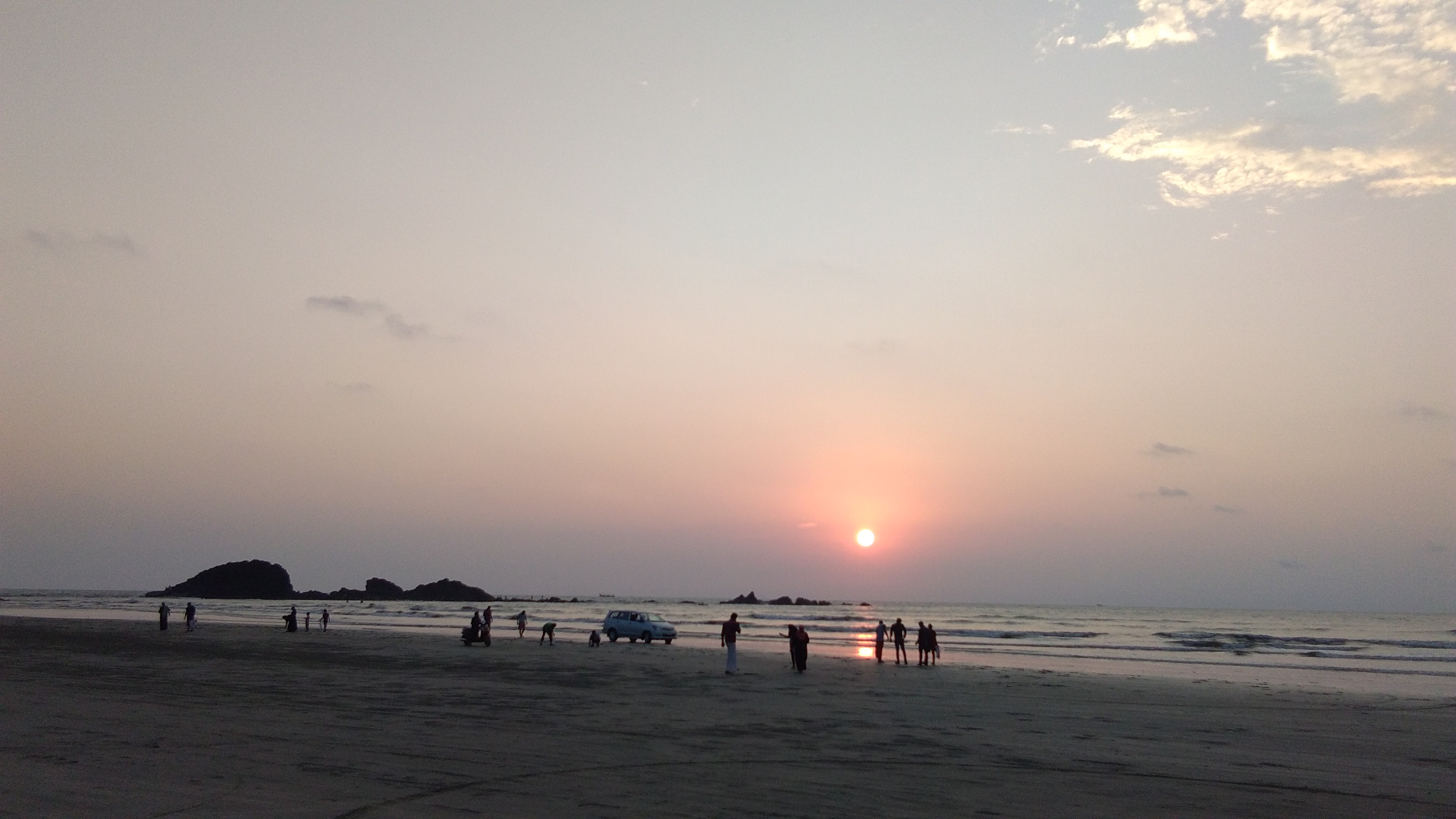
Sunset at Muzhappilangad Beach

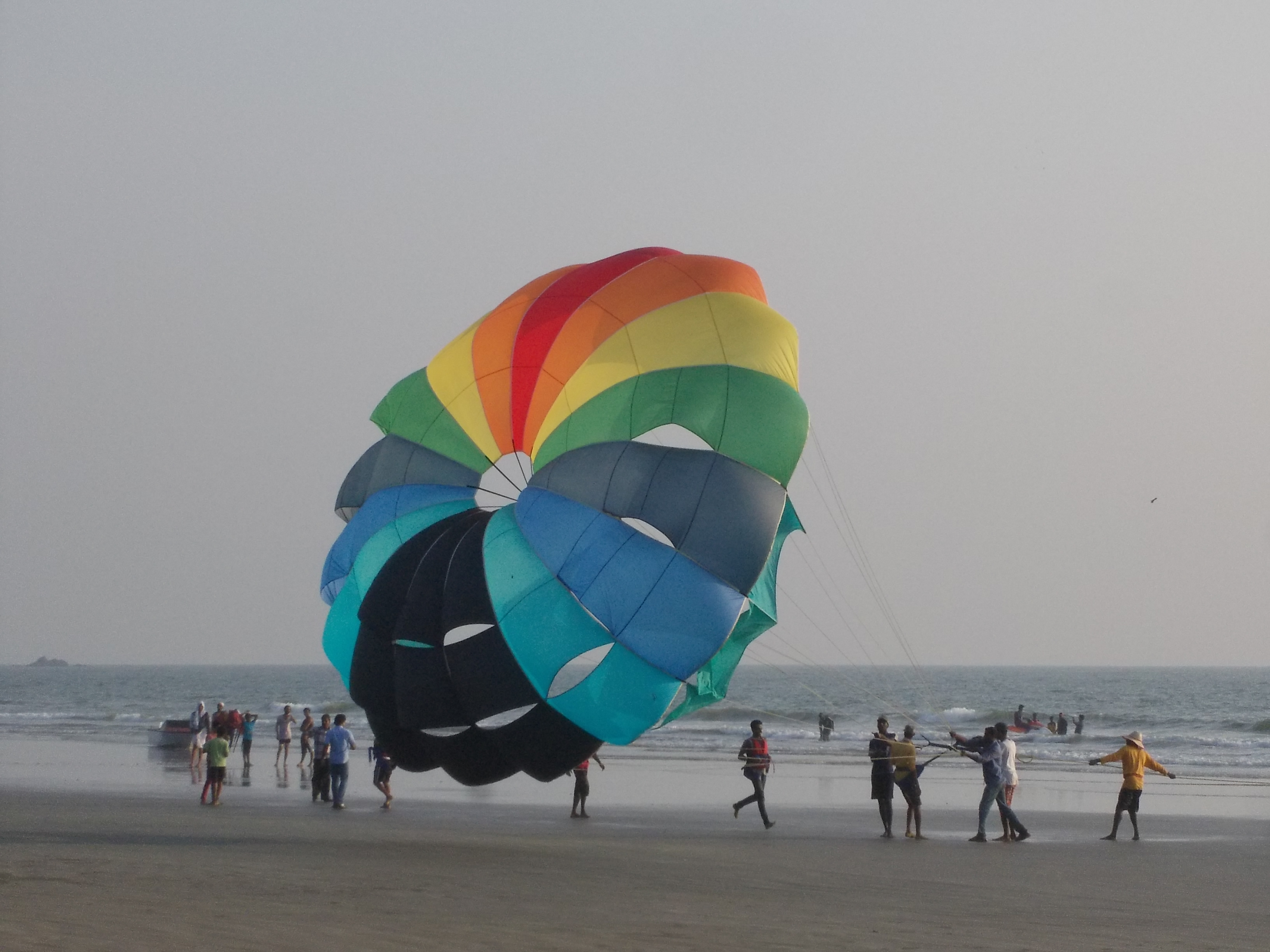
Para gliding at Muzhappilangad Beach

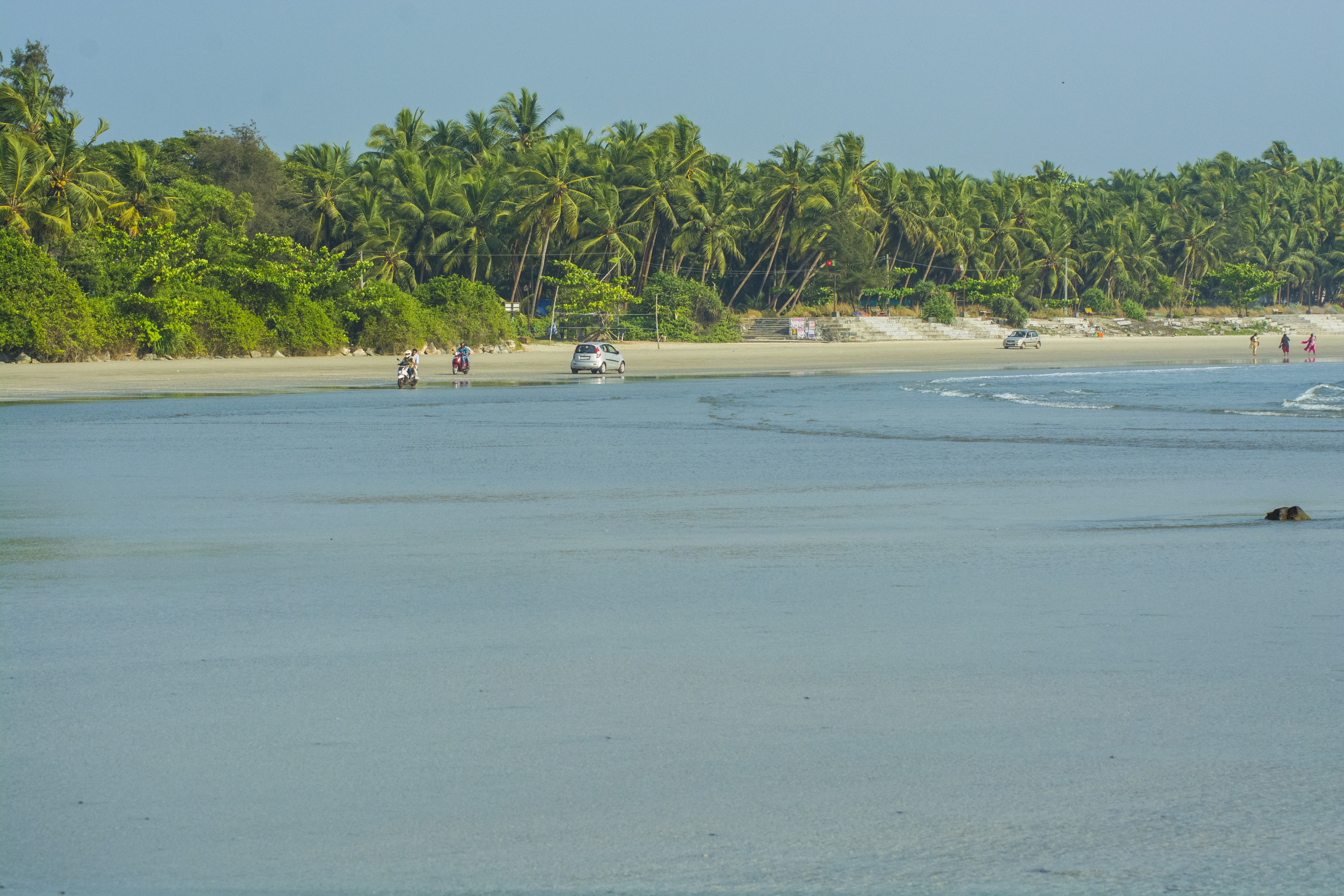
Muzhappilangad beach

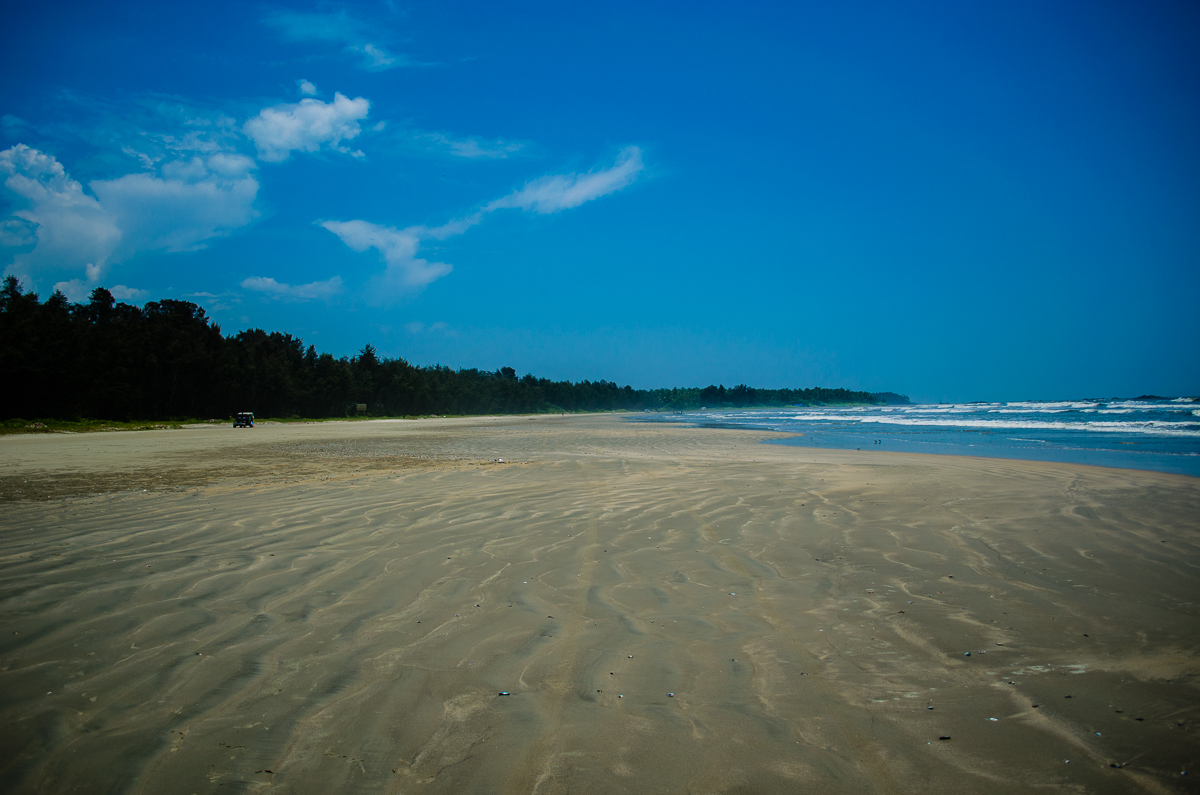
Beach

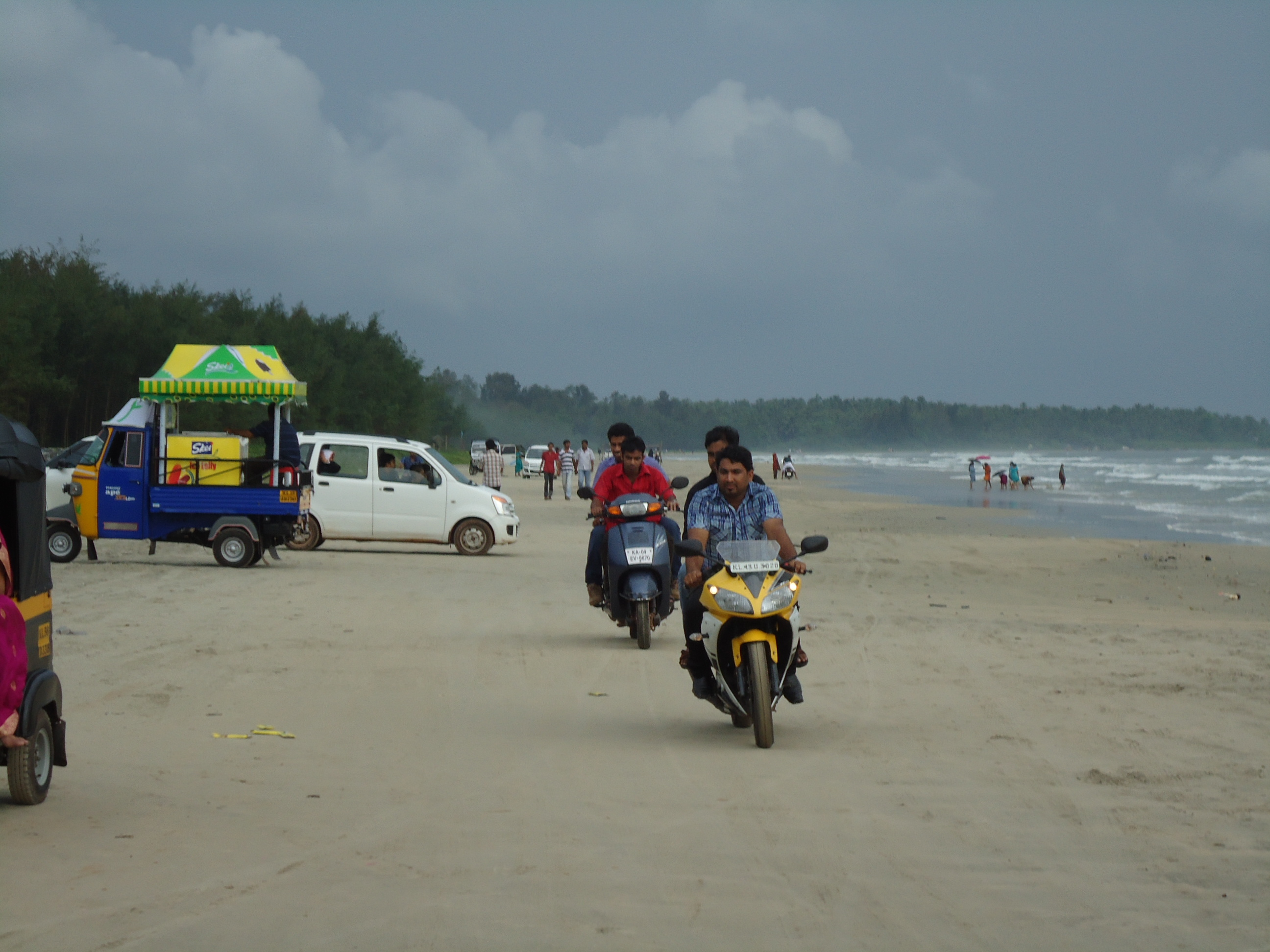
Muzhappilangad drive-in beach

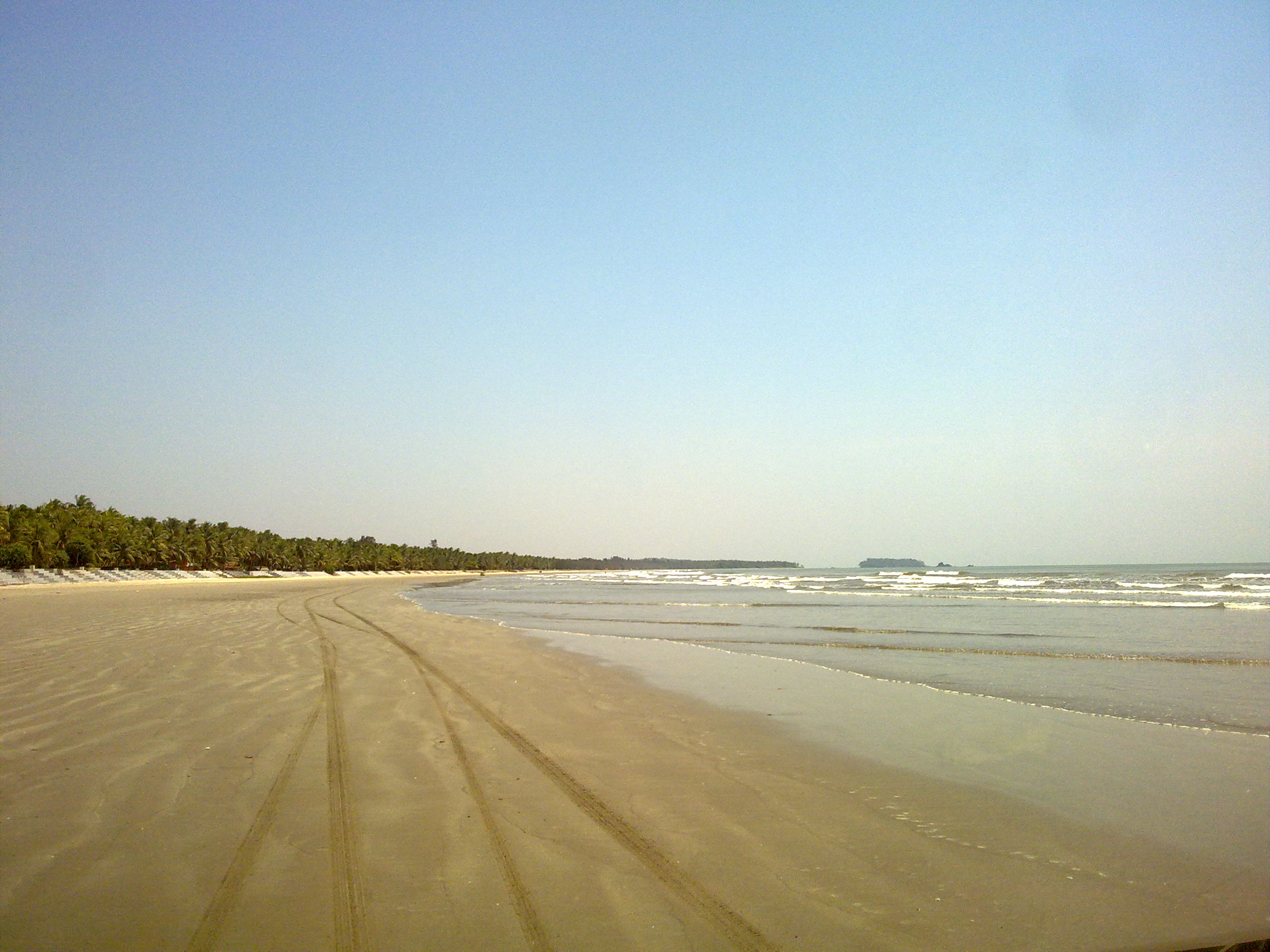
Muzhappilangad drive-in beach

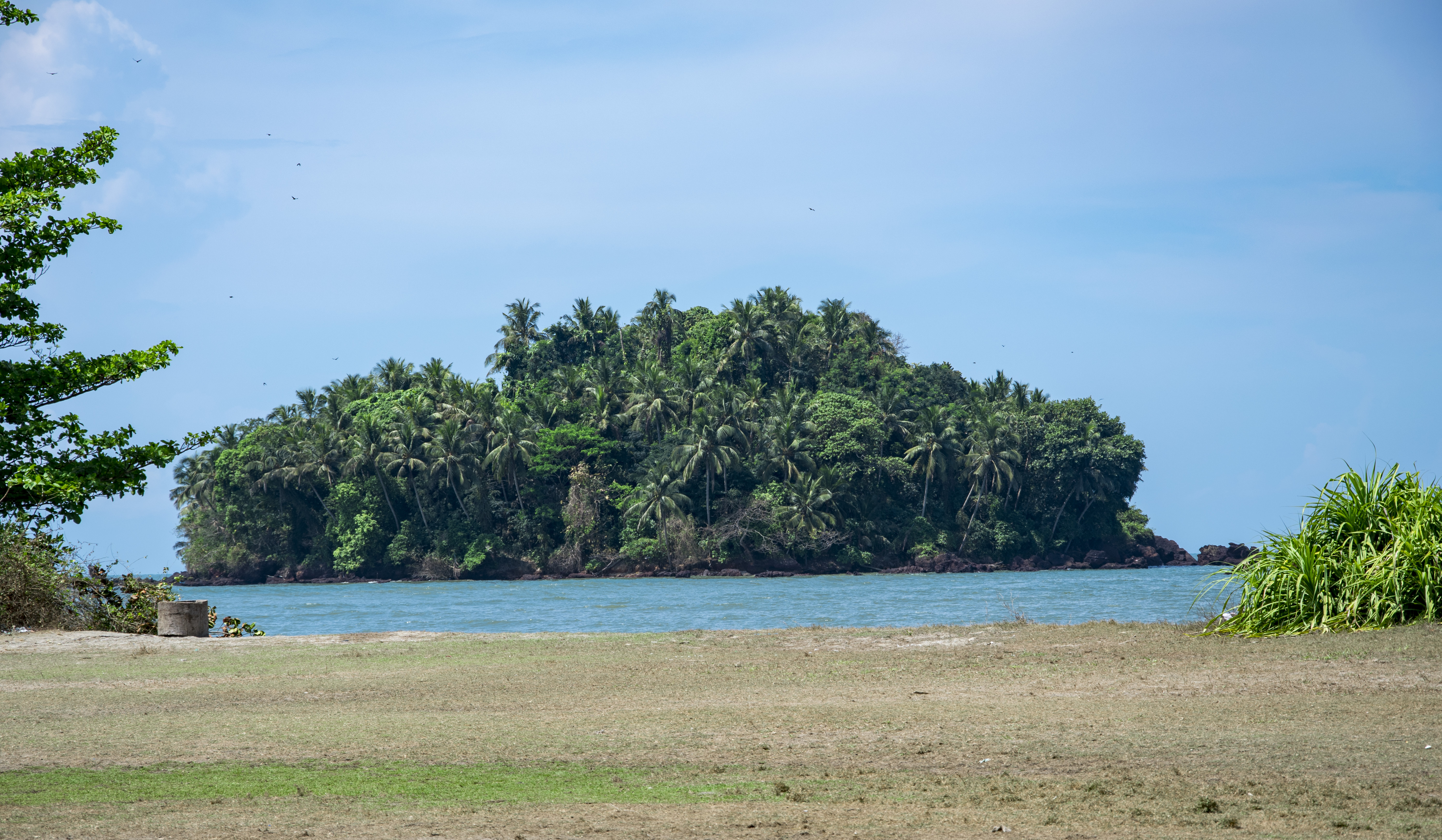
Nearby Dharmadam Island

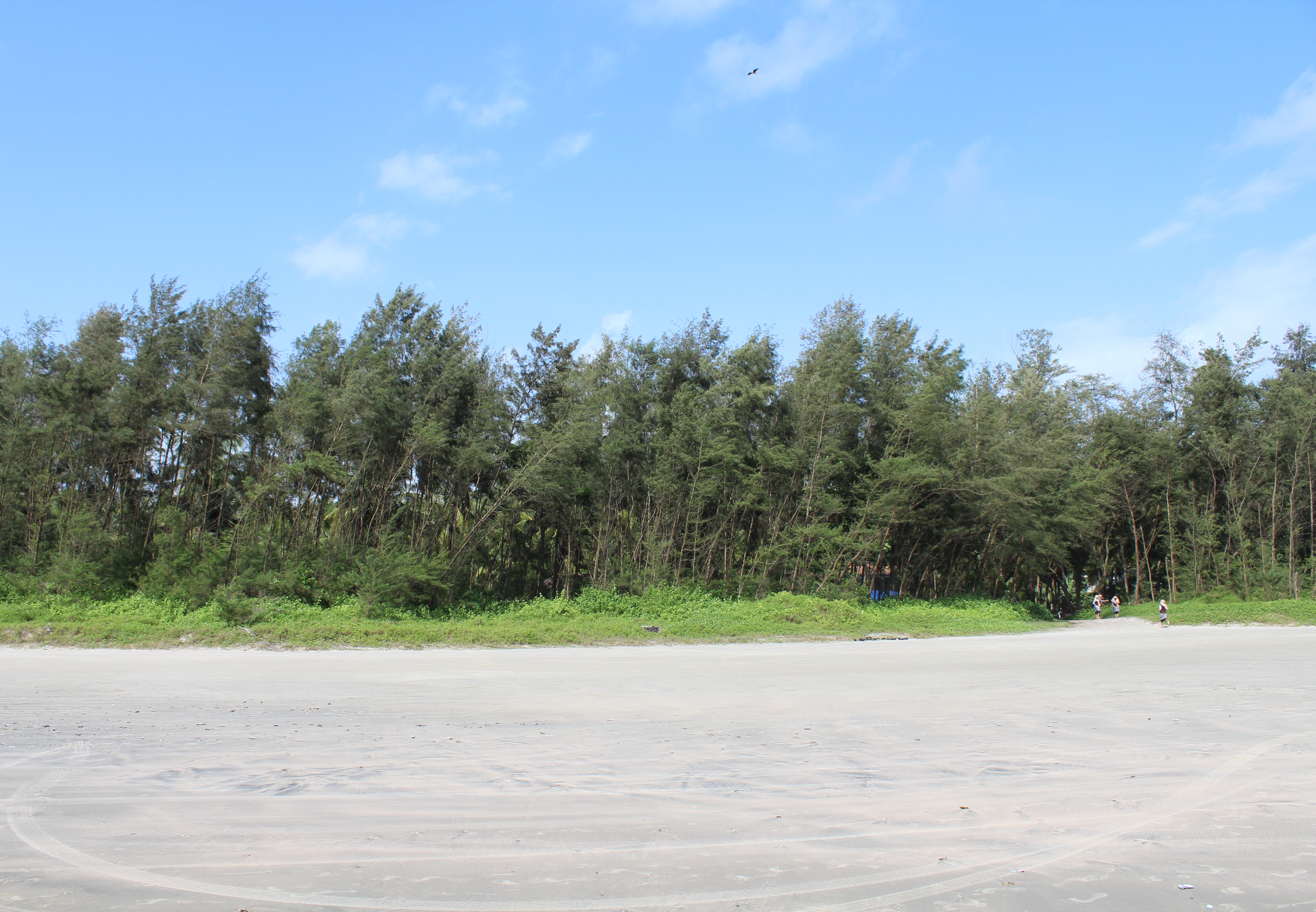
Behind the beach

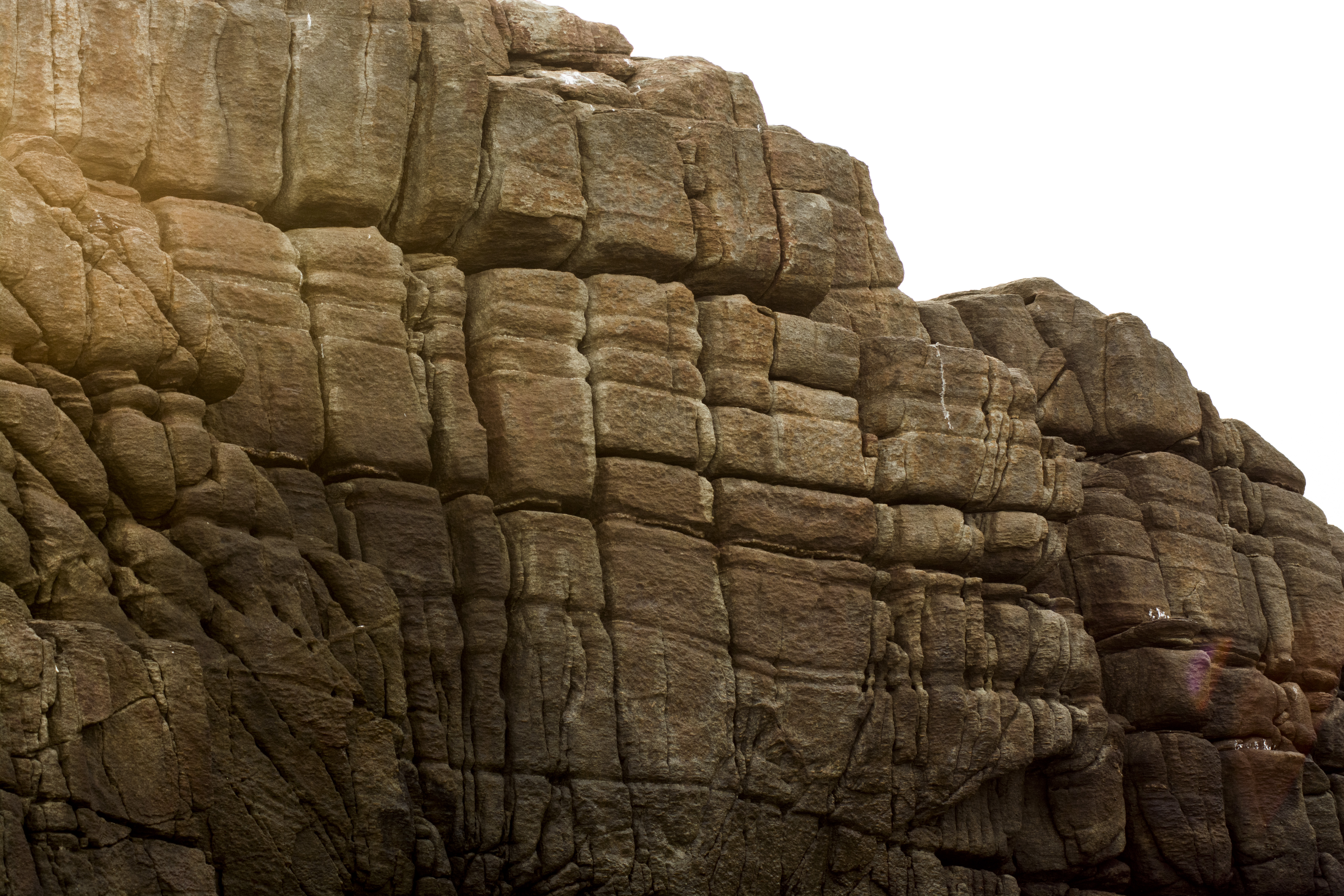
Rock formation at the north of the beach

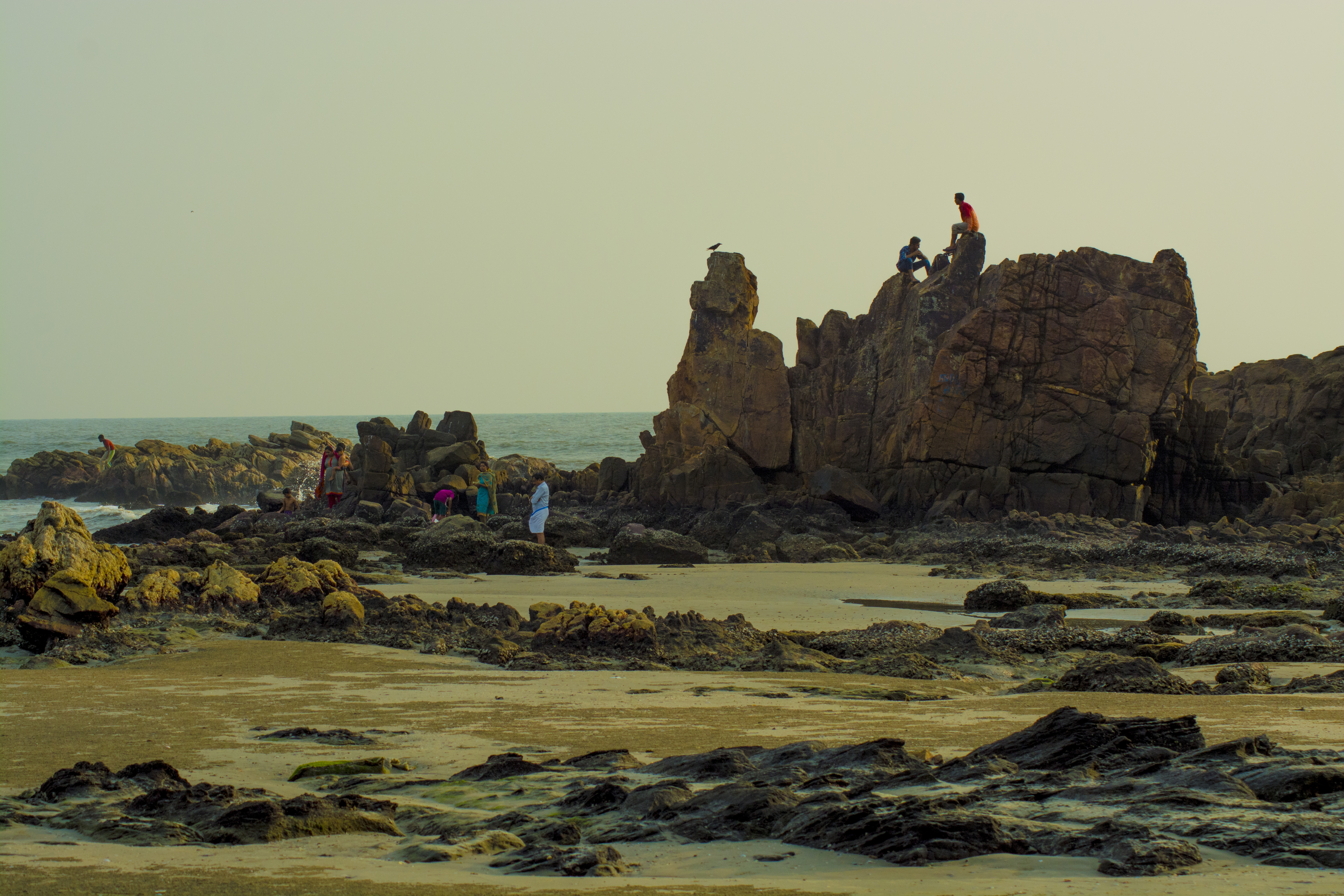
Rock formation at the north of the beach

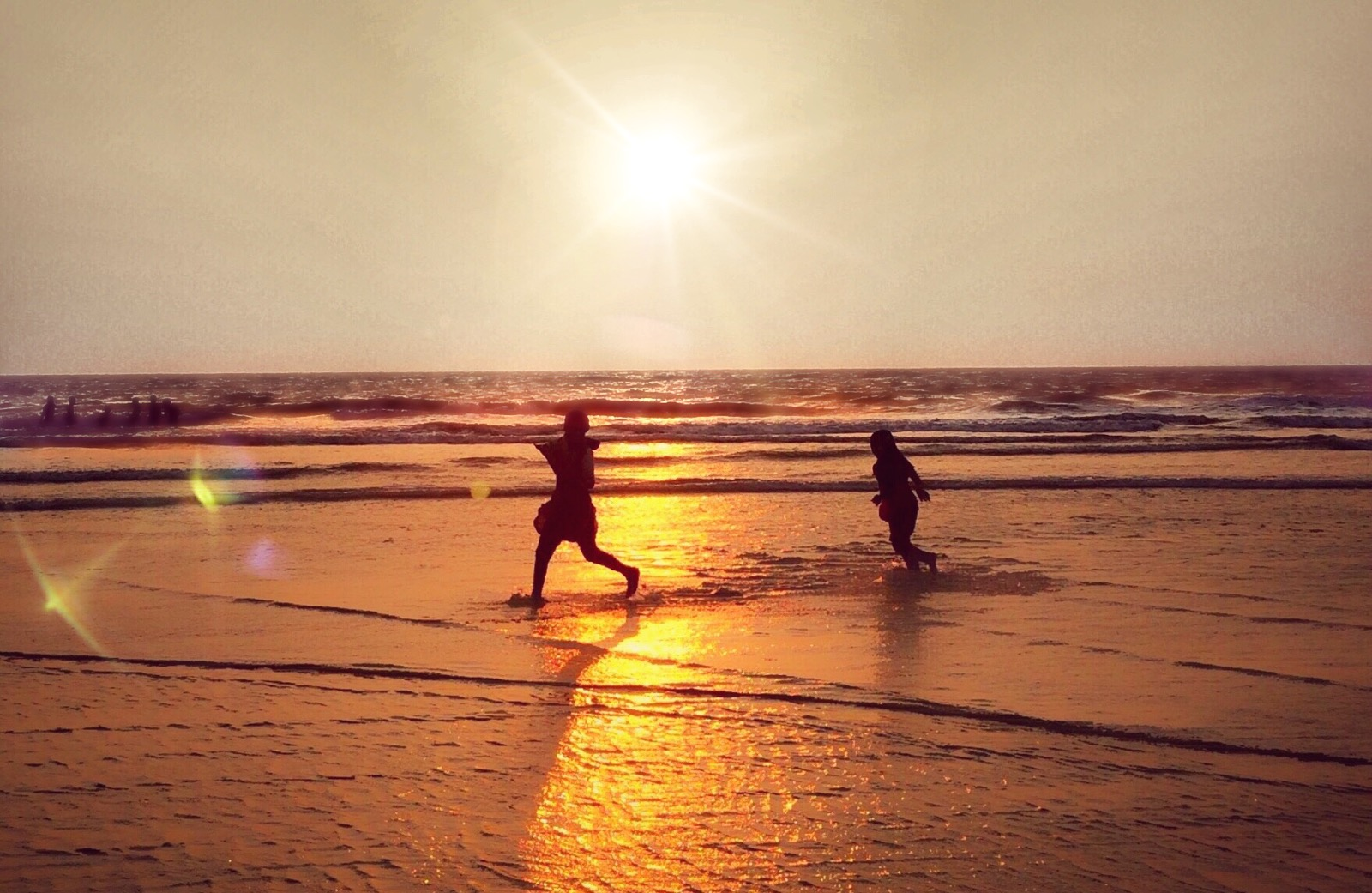

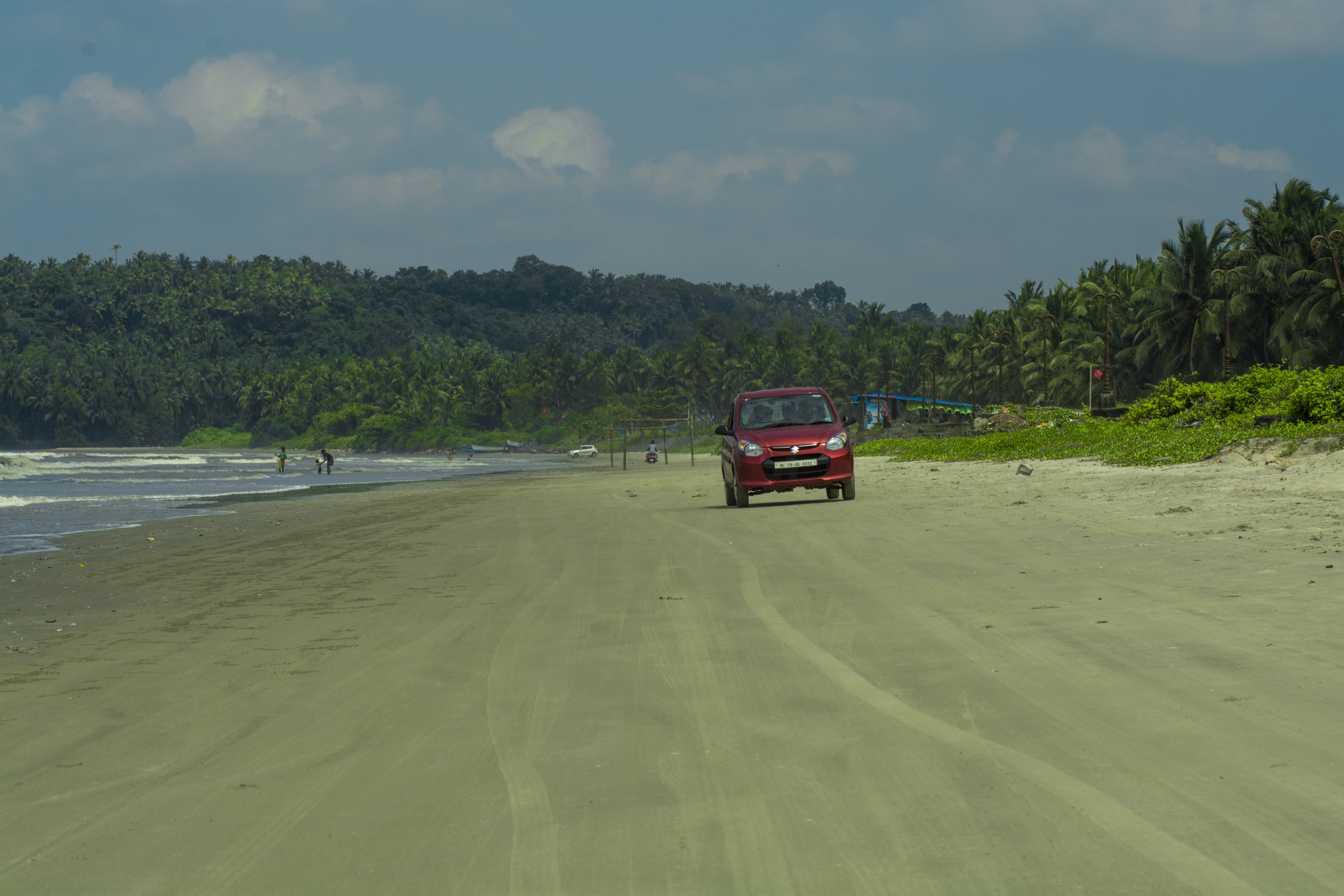

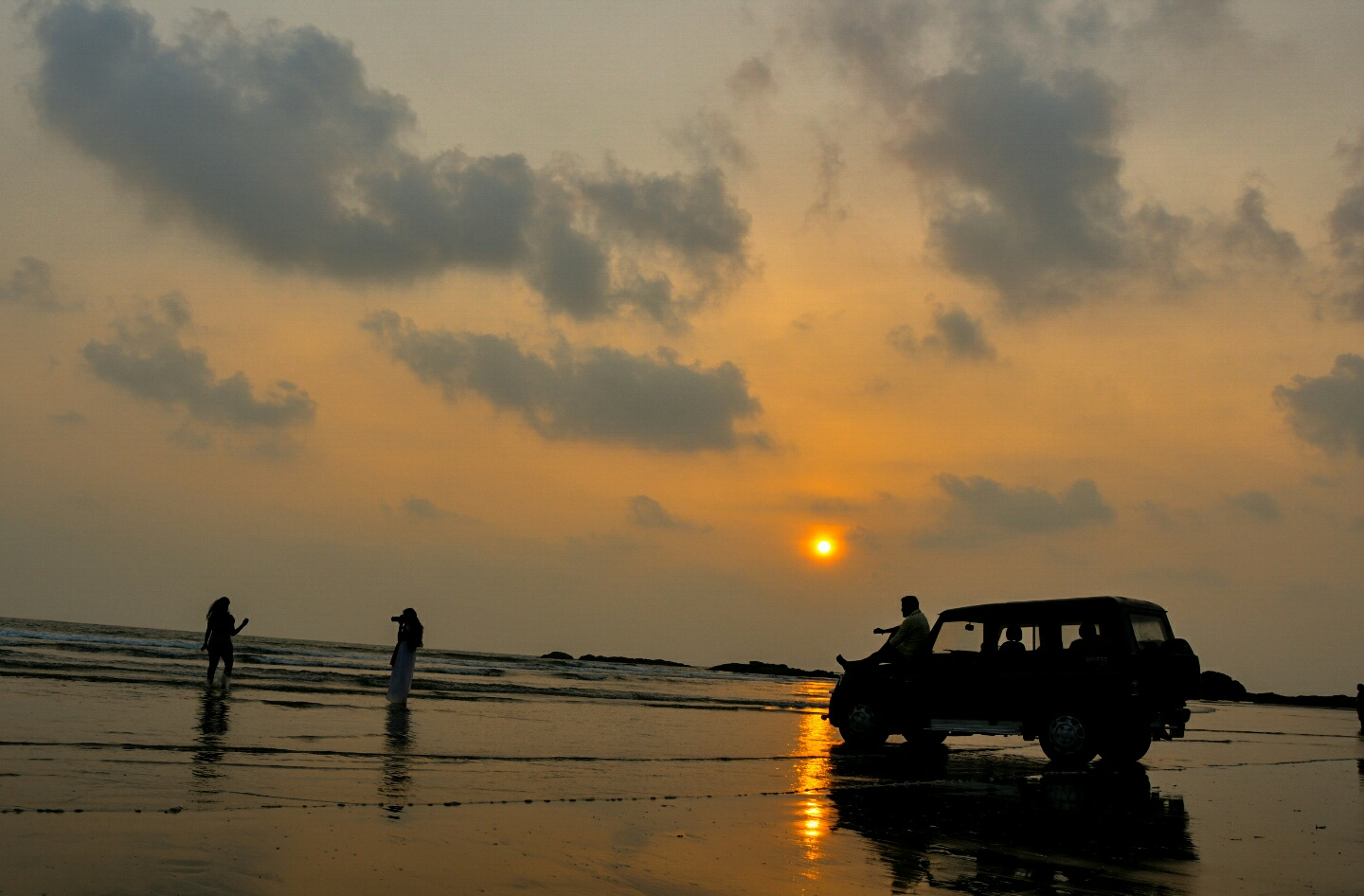

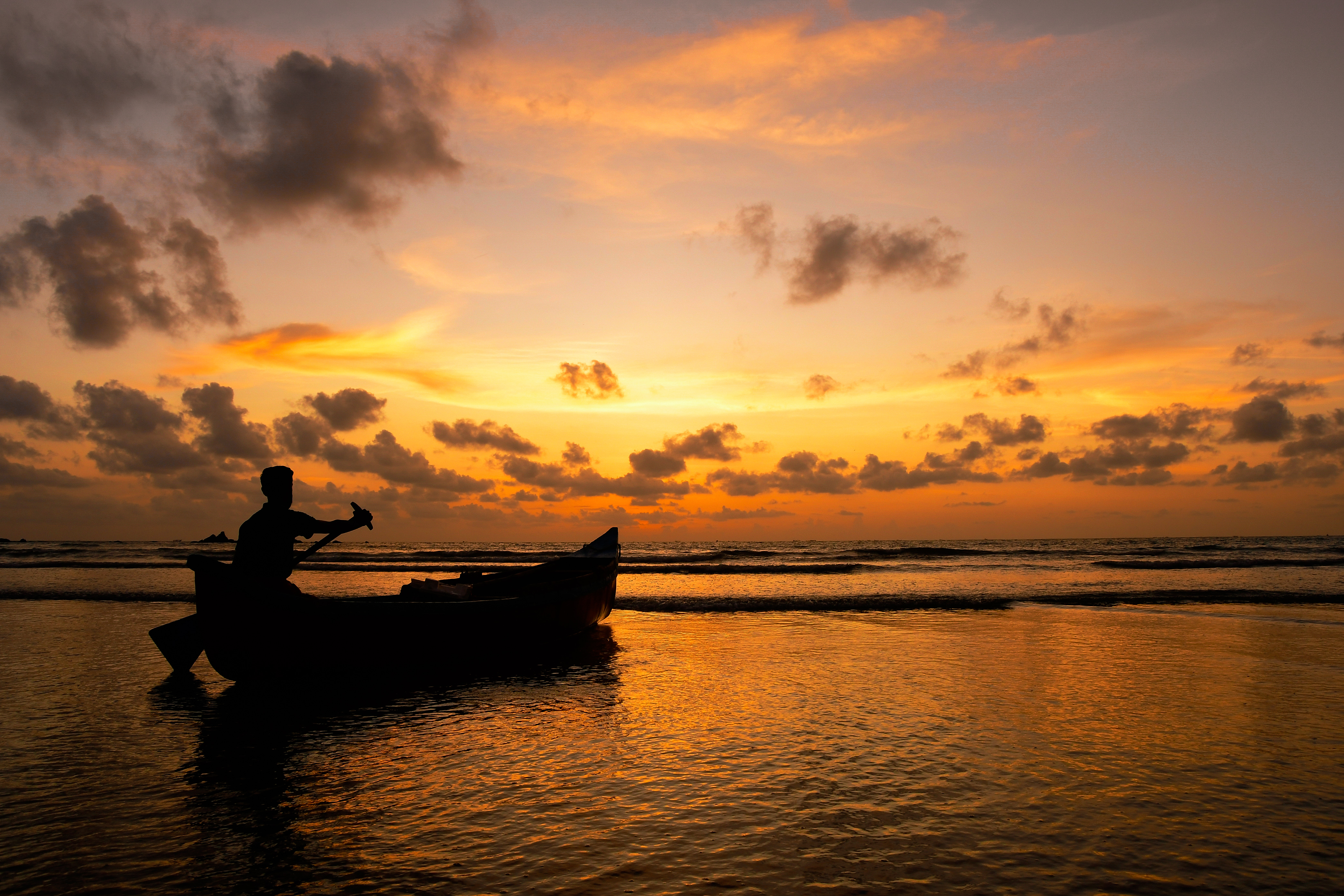

Arikkadukka (Stuffed Mussels)

== See also ==
- Bekal beach
- Kappad beach
- Kozhikode Beach
- Muzhappilangad
- Thalassery
- Dharmadam
- Dharmadam Island
- Kannur
