= Dharmadam Island =

Island of India

Dharmadam Island Green Island
- Island
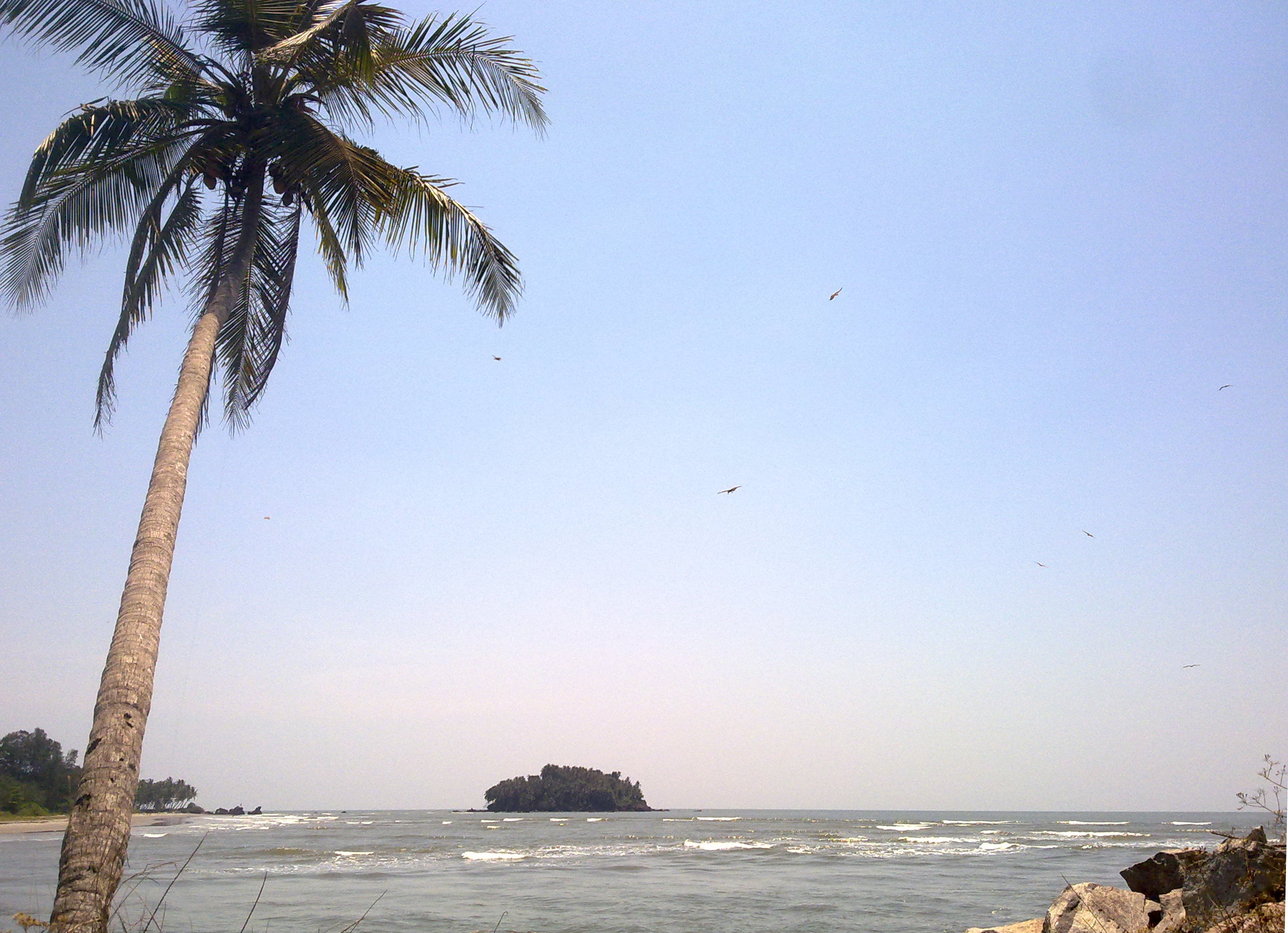
- Dharmadam Island
- Interactive map of Dharmadam Island
- Coordinates: 11.7698°N 75.4505°E
- Country: India
- State: Kerala
- District: Kannur

Area
  - Total: 0.02 km^{2} (0.0077 sq mi)

Dharmadam Island (Green Island) is a small 2-hectare private island in Thalassery, Kannur District, Kerala. It lies about 100 metres from the mainland at Dharmadam. The island attracts migratory birds.

In February 2026, the Kerala government has sanctioned ₹238-crore integrated project to strengthen tourism infrastructure at Muzhappilangad beach, Dharmadam beach, and Dharmadam Island. A nature hub with an underwater sculpture garden and an elevated nature walk are being developed in Dharmadam island.

In 2013, an incomplete projects, including Dharamadam Island Tourist Centre, opened during the LDF regime and were later neglected for over a decade.

== See also ==
- Muzhappilangad
- Muzhappilangad beach
