= Green Island (Michigan) =

Island in Mackinac County, Michigan, USA

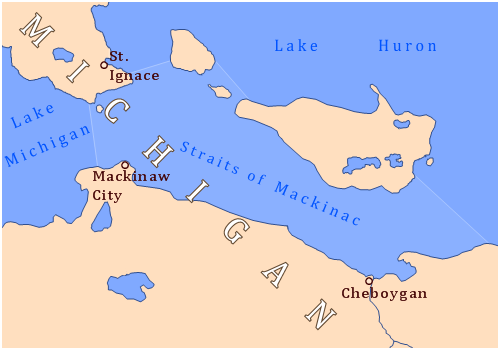
- Green Island is the small island south of St. Ignace.

- Location within Michigan Location within the United States

Geography
- Location: Lake Michigan
- Coordinates: 45°50′06″N 84°44′59″W
- Area: 16.46 acres (6.66 ha)
- Highest elevation: 591 ft (180.1 m)

Administration
- United States
- State: Michigan
- County: Mackinac County
- Township: Moran

Demographics
- Population: Uninhabited

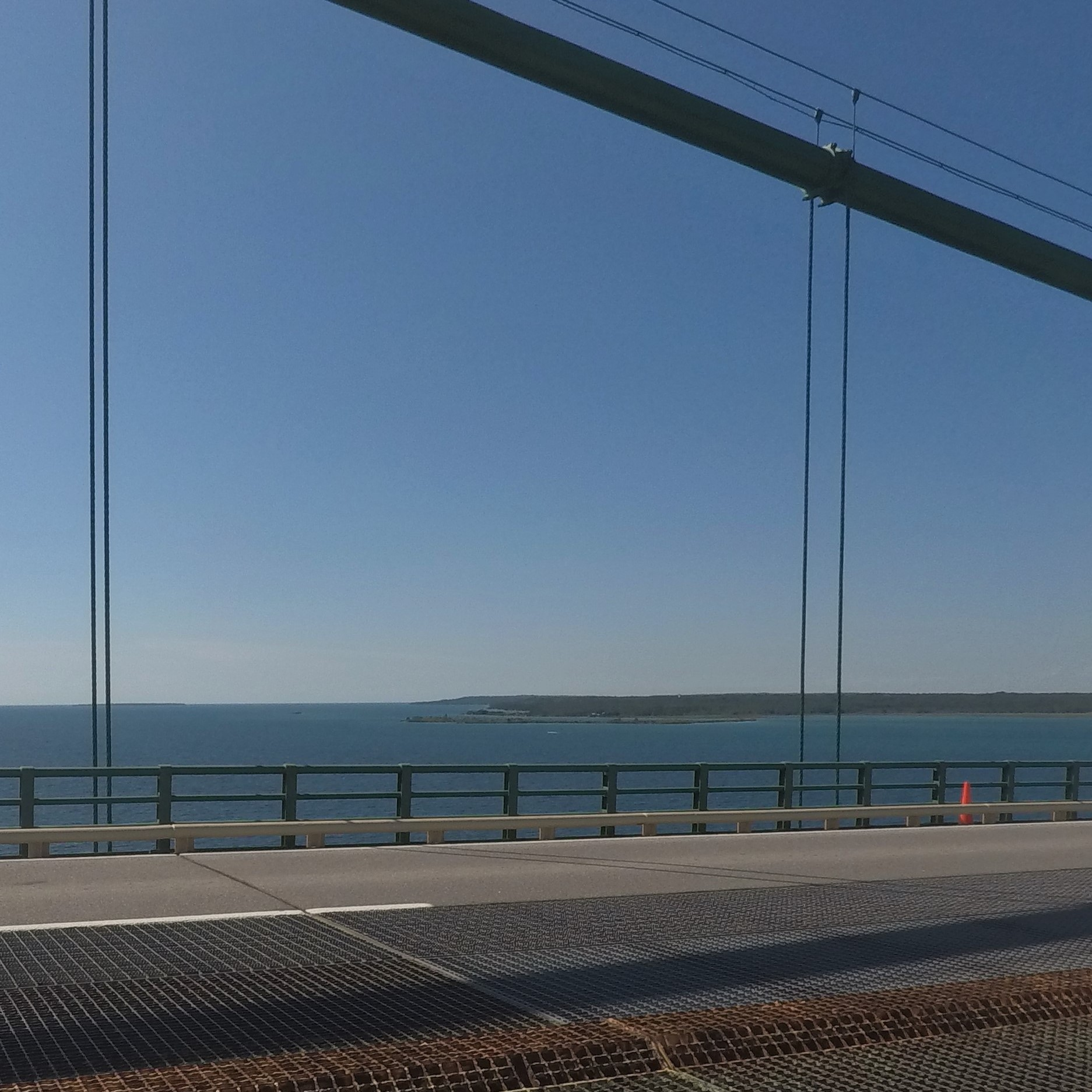
Green Island from the Mackinac Bridge.

Green Island is an island in Mackinac County, Michigan. The island is located in the Straits of Mackinac in Lake Michigan. Green Island is approximately 16.46 acres (6.66 ha) in size. The island is uninhabited and covered in thicket with a few trees scattered throughout. It is .25 miles (0.40 km) south of Point La Barbe on the Upper Peninsula shore. Green Island also lies 1 mile (1.6 km) west of the Mackinac Bridge. It is privately owned.
