= Emerald Isle =

Emerald Isle or Emerald Island or variation, may also refer to:

== Places ==
- Emerald Isle (Northwest Territories), Canada
- Emerald Isle (Ontario), Canada; a village in Selwyn township, Peterborough county
- Emerald Isle, North Carolina, USA
- Emerald Island (phantom), a phantom island reported by some early explorers to lie between Australia and Antarctica
- St. John's Island, Egypt, also known as Zabargad or Emerald Island because of ancient peridot mines

=== Nicknamed ===
- Ireland, so referred to in the poem When Erin First Rose by William Drennan
- Kodiak Island, Alaska, USA
- Lesbos, Greece
- Montserrat, Caribbean
- Phú Quốc, Vietnam

== Other uses ==
- Emerald Island (EP), by Caro Emerald
- "The Emerald Isle", comic opera by Sir Arthur Sullivan
- Emerald Isle (video game), 1984 computer game by Level 9
- Ulmus parvifolia 'Emer I', the Chinese elm cultivar called Emerald Isle.

== See also ==
- Emerald (disambiguation)
- Isle (disambiguation)
