= Green Island (Aleutian Islands) =

Island in Alaska, United States

Coordinates: 51.8116°N 176.8340°W

Green Island (Aleut: Hmiikaayagus) is an island located immediately west of Adak Island in the Andreanof Islands group of the Aleutian Islands, Alaska. It is located in the southern portion of the entrance to the Bay of Islands. The island was named by members of the U.S. Navy Aleutian Island Survey Expedition in 1934. There are at least three islands named "Green Island" within Alaska. The island is 0.5 mi (0.80 km) long.
