= Uyea, Unst =

Uninhabited island south of Unst in Shetland, Scotland

Uyea
Uyea (Scots)

Location
- Location within Shetland
- OS grid reference: HU600994
- Coordinates: 60.6667°N 00.900°W

Name
- Name meaning: the isle

Physical geography
- Island group: Shetland
- Area: 205 ha (0.79 sq mi)
- Area rank: 105=
- Highest elevation: The Ward 50 m (164 ft)

Administration
- Council area: Shetland Islands
- Country: Scotland
- Sovereign state: United Kingdom

Demographics
- Population: 0

Uyea (Scots: Uyea) is an uninhabited island, lying south of Unst in Shetland, Scotland.

== Etymology ==
The Norn word for an island is øy, so Uyea (pronounced "Øya") simply means "the isle." This name was given to it by the people of southern Unst as it is the largest island near their shores (excluding Yell), and they thought of Unst itself as the mainland.

== History ==
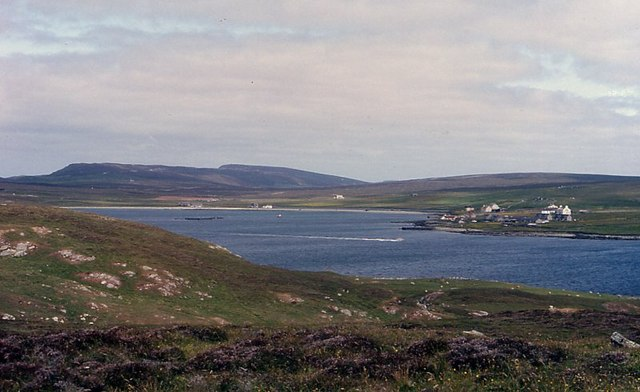
View over Uyeasound from Uyea

The island was inhabited as early as the Bronze Age, and a chambered cairn can still be seen. In the twelfth century, Saint Olaf's chapel overlooking Brei Wick was built.

In 1745, two girls from Uyea rowed to the small island of Haaf Gruney to milk some of the cows grazing here. They were caught in a storm when trying to return, and eventually they found their tiny boat blown to Karmøy in south west Norway. The Uyea girls ended up marrying Karmøy men, and their descendants still live there.

Jack Priest, in his memoir of the isle during World War II, described it as "a beachcomber's dream - washed as it is with a westerly Atlantic tide through Bluemull Sound, fed from the east by waters of the Norwegian basin and finally the North Sea pressing up from among the isles through the narrow channel between Yell and Fetlar and feeding Colgrave Sound on the south side of Uyea Isle."

The island was the home of Sir Basil Neven-Spence, who was the Conservative Member of Parliament for Orkney and Shetland from 1935 to 1950.

To the present day, Neven-Spence is the most recent person not from the Liberal Democrats or the Liberal Party to represent the constituency.

== See also ==
- Uyea, Northmavine
