= Greene Island (Rhode Island) =

Island in Narragansett Bay

Coordinates: 41°43′57″N 71°22′43″W

Greene Island (also known as Greene's Island or Little Island) is a small island in Narragansett Bay, Warwick, Rhode Island. The island was named after Captain John Greene who purchased the island in 1642 from Native Americans as part of a larger purchase of 660 acres around Occupaspatuxet Cove. Occupaspatuxet means where “meadows cut through by a river,” and the area was also known as Greene's Hold. Chief Miantonomi was one of the Indian witnesses on the deed to Greene, which referenced the "little island." The Greenes were followers of Samuel Gorton, a radical Christian philosopher and theologian, who sought refuge in the Warwick area. Greene Island features shallow tidal flats and marsh grasses.
