= Green Island (Western Australia) =

Island in Western Australia

Native name: Watami (Nyungar)
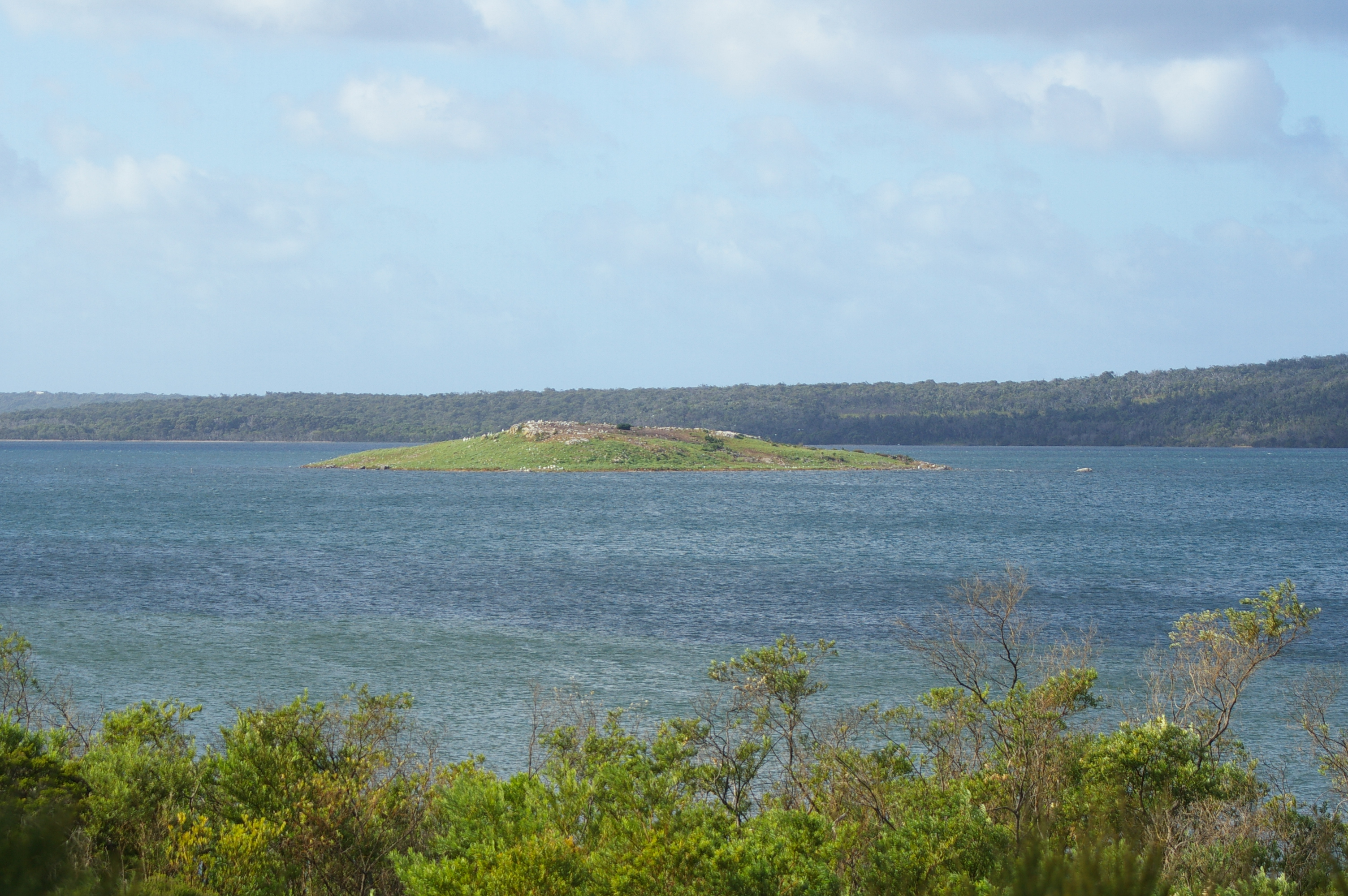
- Green Island from Bayonet Head

Geography
- Coordinates: 34°59′11″S 117°56′59″E

Administration
- Australia

Watami/Green Island is an island in Oyster Harbour located approximately 6.5 kilometres (4 mi) northeast of Albany in Western Australia. The island has a total area of 2 hectares (5 acres) and was designated as a Class 1A Nature Reserve in 1988.

The nearest point on the mainland, Bayonet Head, is located approximately 750 metres (2,461 ft) northwest of the island.

== History ==
Green Island was named by George Vancouver, who also named Oyster Harbour when he visited the area in 1791. It is one of only four permanent pelican breeding grounds in Western Australia, the others being Mandurah, Shark Bay and Rockingham. The breeding pelicans can be seen from the Kalgan Queen Riverboat, as the island itself is a reserve.

After Albany was first settled very late in 1826, Green Island was planted for vegetables. The first crop was laid in the Spring of 1827. By 1830 it was very productive and a hut had been erected for the garrison gardener to live in.

In 1826, before the New South Wales military arrived to establish a garrison at nearby Princess Royal Harbour, a group of sealers took five Aboriginals to Green Island to catch birds. The sealers rowed away, leaving the Aboriginals behind, then returned the next day bringing water. The Aboriginals attempted to take the boat, and the sealers fired on them killing one Aboriginal man. The remaining Aboriginals were removed to Michaelmas Island and left there making "great lamentations".

In 1991 the government department Fisheries Western Australia granted a fish farm license to the company Ocean Foods who have leases north and northeast of Green Island where blue mussels are farmed.

== Fauna ==
The island is noted as an important breeding ground for small numbers of the Australian pelican. It was estimated in 1993 that seven active nests were located on the island.

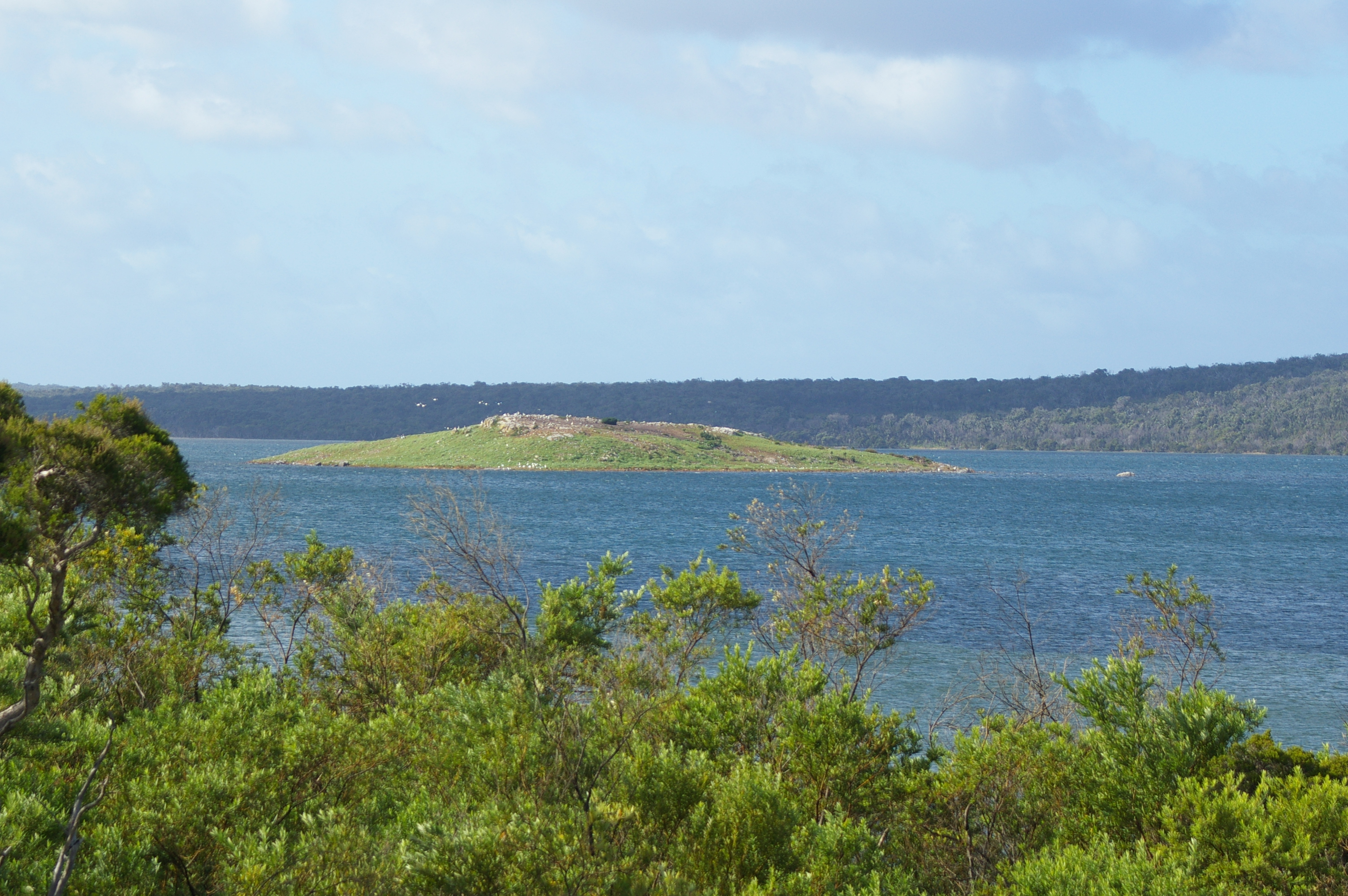
Green Island from Bayonet Head

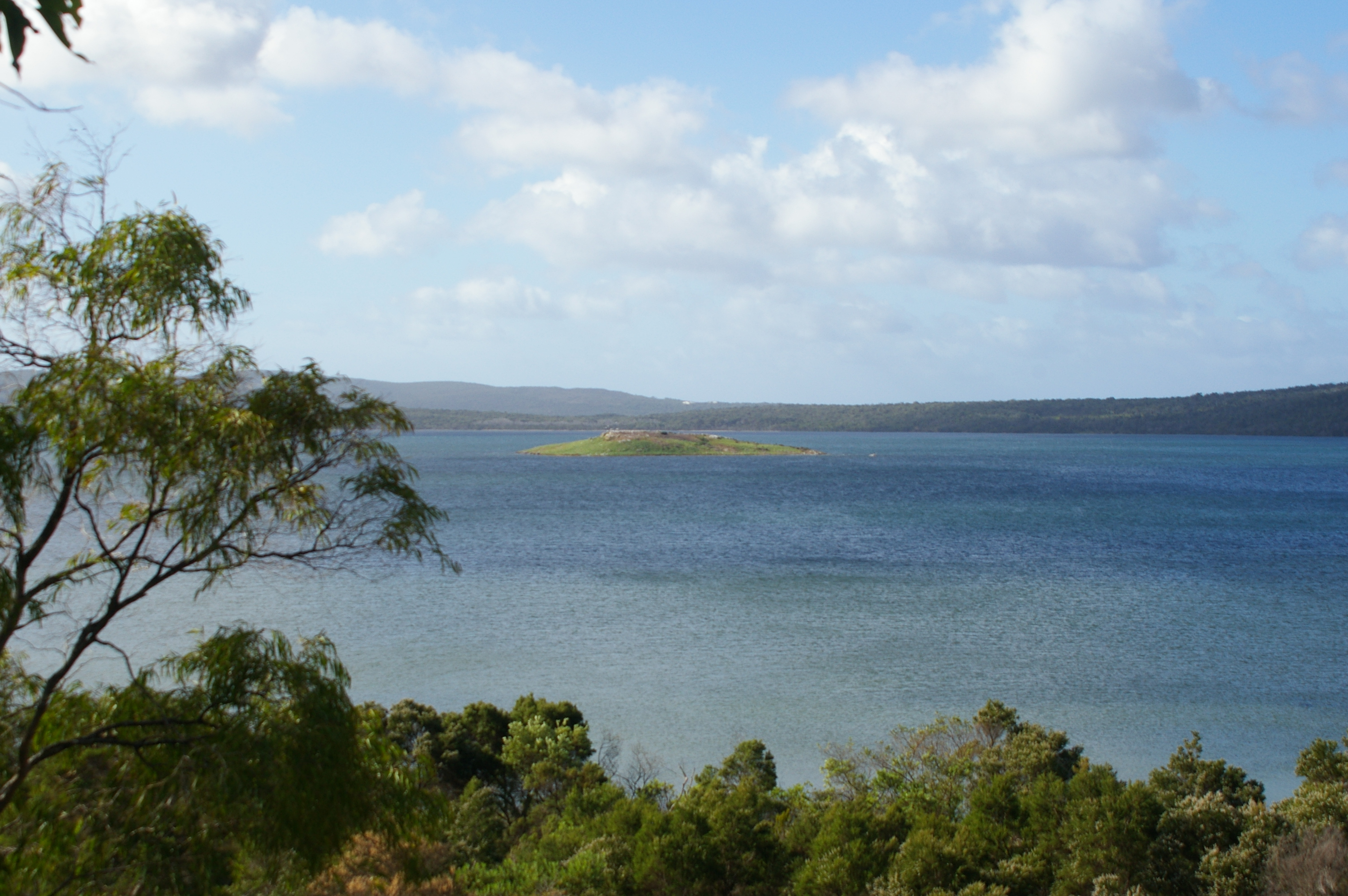
Green Island in Oyster Harbour from the lookout at Bayonet Head
