= Île Verte (Finistère) =

Island off Brittany, France

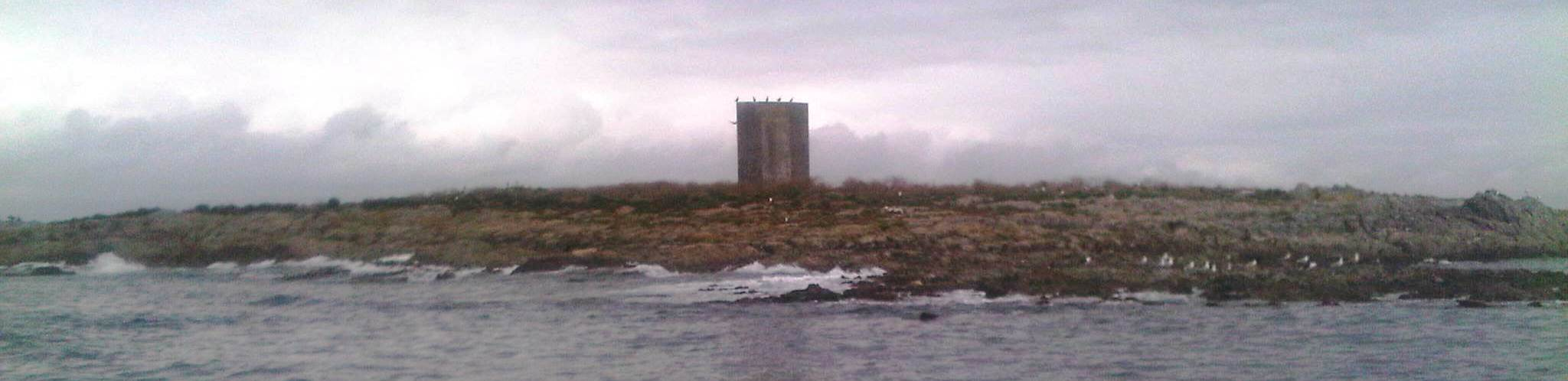
- View of Île Verte

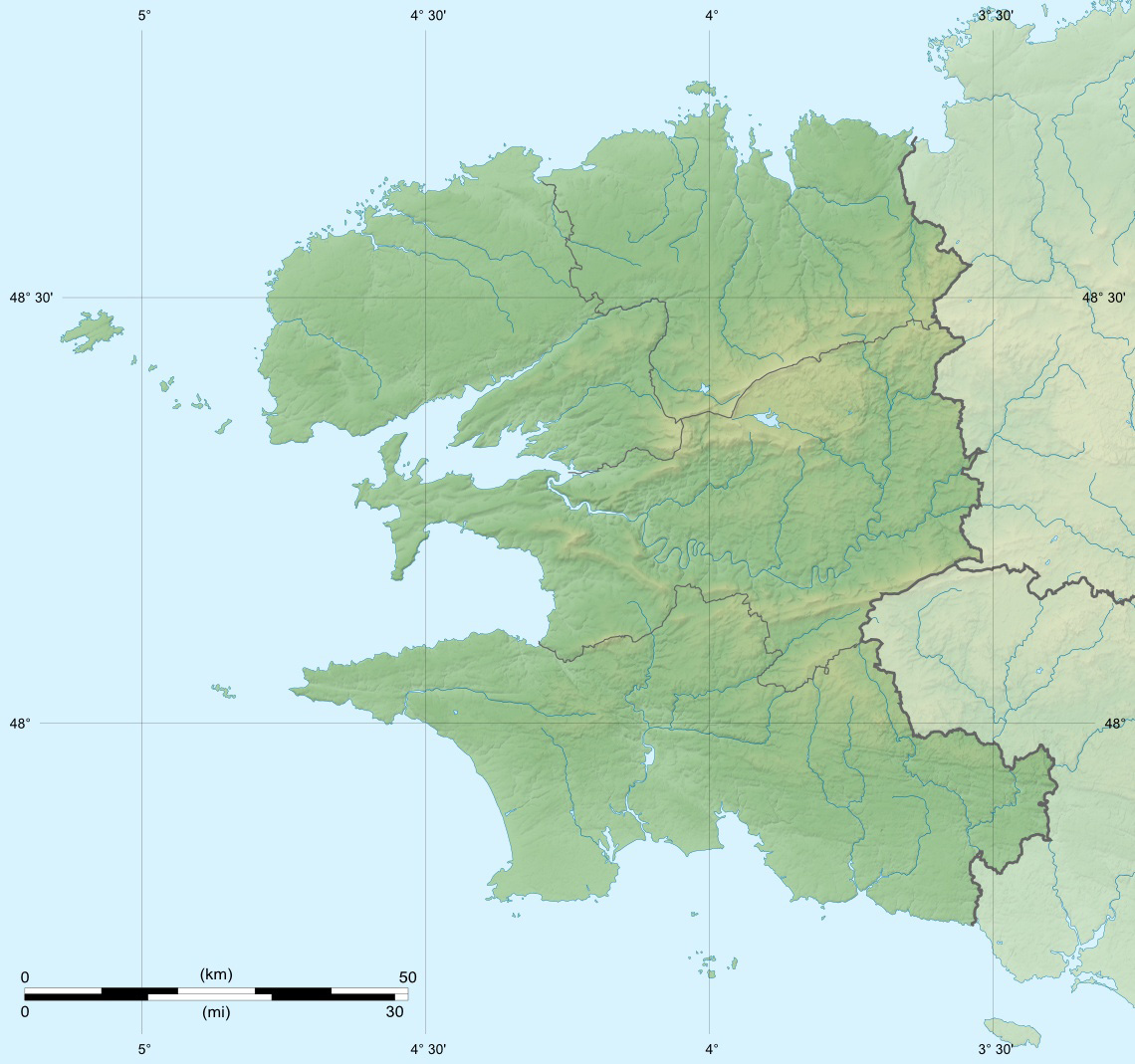
- Location within Finistère Location within France

Geography
- Location: Atlantic Ocean
- Coordinates: 47.772°N 3.800°W

Administration
- France
- Region: Brittany
- Department: Finistère
- Arrondissement: Quimper

Demographics
- Population: 0

The Île Verte (Breton: Enez Glas) is an island off the south coast of Brittany in the north west of France, lying to the south of Finistère, near Trégunc and Nevez.

The island is a Daymark as an aid to navigation by sailors.

== See also ==
- Daymark
