= Green Island National Park =

National park in Australia

- IUCN category II (national park)
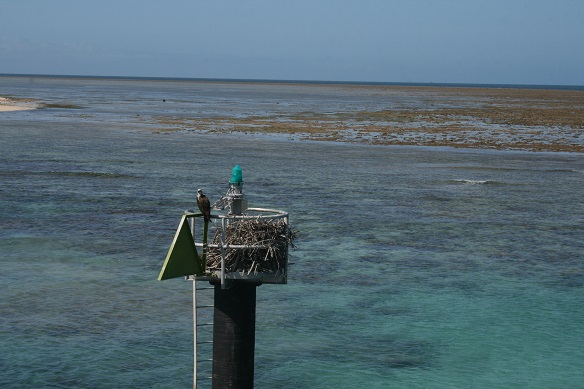

- Location within Queensland
- Location: Queensland
- Nearest city: Cairns
- Coordinates: 16°45′35″S 145°58′28″E
- Area: 12 ha (30 acres)
- Established: 1937
- Governing body: Queensland Parks and Wildlife Service
- Website: Official website

Green Island National Park is a protected area declared over a small (12 ha) coral cay of Green Island, Cairns Region, Queensland, Australia. It is known to the local Gungganyji Aboriginal peoples as Dabuukji. The Gungganyji people used the island as an initiation ground.

It is 27 km offshore from Cairns (1394 km northwest of Brisbane), Queensland, can be accessed by a choice of boats leaving daily from Cairns, and is reputed to be the most visited (popular) island National Park within the Great Barrier Reef World Heritage Area.

== Park features ==
Green Island is a true coral cay formed over thousands of years by the build-up of sand and coral rubble deposited on the calm side of a platform reef. The island is covered in tropical vine forest which supports a diversity of birds and insects. The surrounding coral reef is home to many kinds of corals, clams, fish, stingrays and other reef life. Green and hawksbill turtles are seen offshore. More than 60 species of bird are found on the island. While exploring the east coast in 1770, Lieutenant James Cook recorded on his chart "a low green woody island" and named the island after his ship's astronomer, Charles Green. In 1857, the first of many beche-de-mer fishing stations was established on the island. In 1928, the first regular ferry service began in the region.

Green Island has been a popular tourist resort for more than a century. The island became a national park in 1937, a marine park in 1974 and part of the Great Barrier Reef World Heritage Area in 1981. Today the island, reef and beaches are managed together as a recreation area.

Camping on the island is not permitted. A small luxury resort is built on the island with daily ferry services providing access.

== See also ==
- Protected areas of Queensland
