= Green Island (Queensland) =

Native name: Wunyami
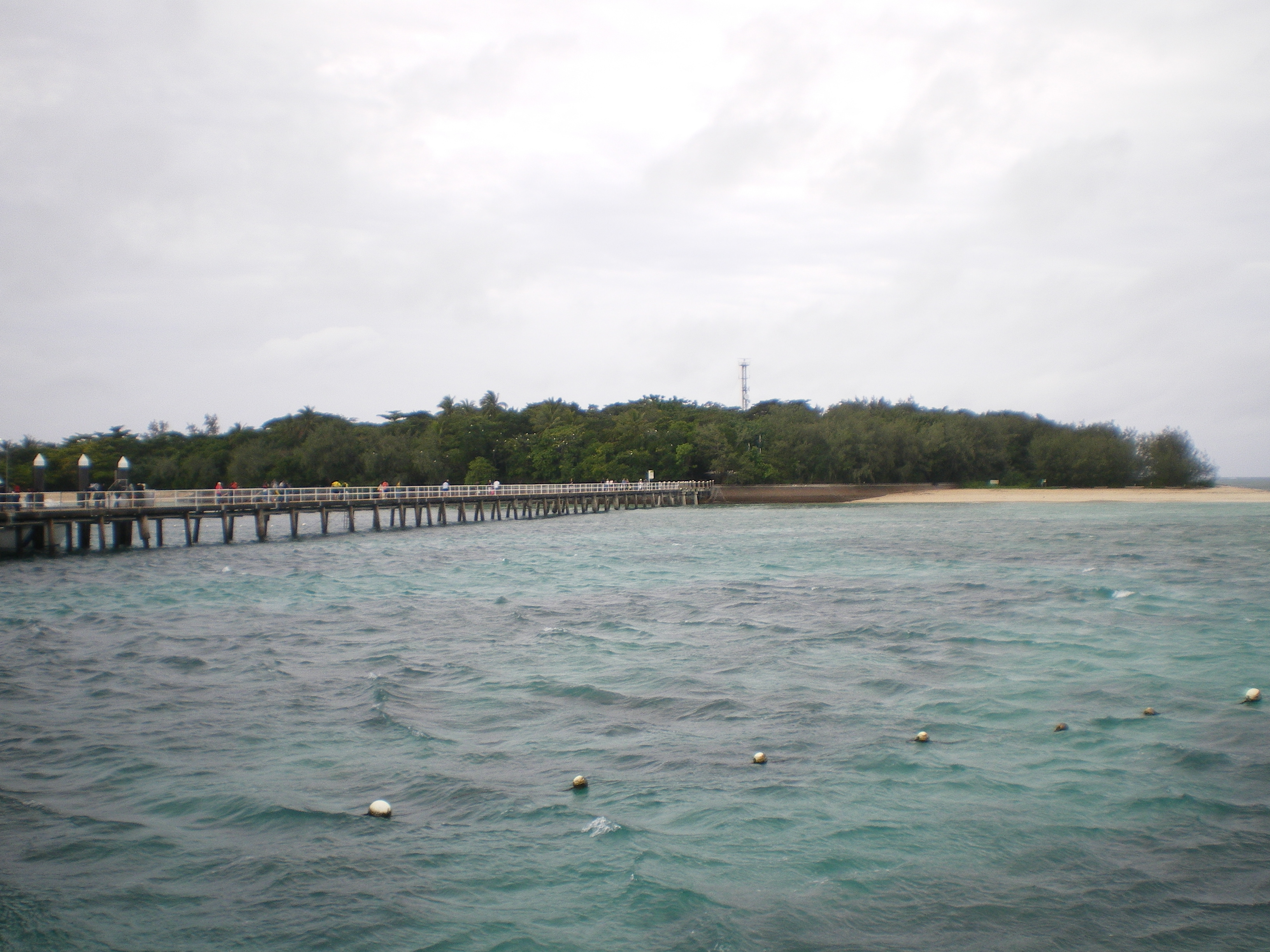
- Green Island jetty, 2008
- Interactive map of Green Island

Geography
- Location: Coral Sea
- Area: 0.15 km^{2} (0.058 sq mi)

Administration
- Australia
- State: Queensland
- LGA: Cairns Region

Green Island
- Suburb
- Interactive map of Green Island
- Country: Australia
- State: Queensland
- City: Cairns
- LGA: Cairns Region

Government
  - State electorate: Cairns
  - Federal division: Leichhardt

Area
  - Total: 3.5 km^{2} (1.4 sq mi)

Population
  - Total: 20 (2021 census)
  - Density: 5.7/km^{2} (15/sq mi)
- Time zone: UTC+10:00 (AEST)
- Postcode: 4871
Suburbs around Green Island
Coral Sea	Coral Sea	Coral Sea
Coral Sea	Green Island	Coral Sea
Coral Sea	Coral Sea	Coral Sea

Green Island (originally Dabuukji) is a marine island and locality in the Cairns Region, Queensland, Australia. In the 2021 census, Green Island had a population of 20 people.

== Geography ==
Green Island is coral cay 27 km (17 mi) offshore from Cairns, Queensland, Australia located within the Great Barrier Reef Marine Park World Heritage Area in the Coral Sea. The island is surrounded by coral reef and protected in the Green Island National Park. Most visitors come for the day. A luxury resort with 46 rooms is situated on the island.

The island supports a range of vegetation, including dry coastal/beach plants and a vine thicket rain forest. There are no natural freshwater springs on the island so all vegetation relies on rainwater and a small freshwater lens located under the island.

== History ==
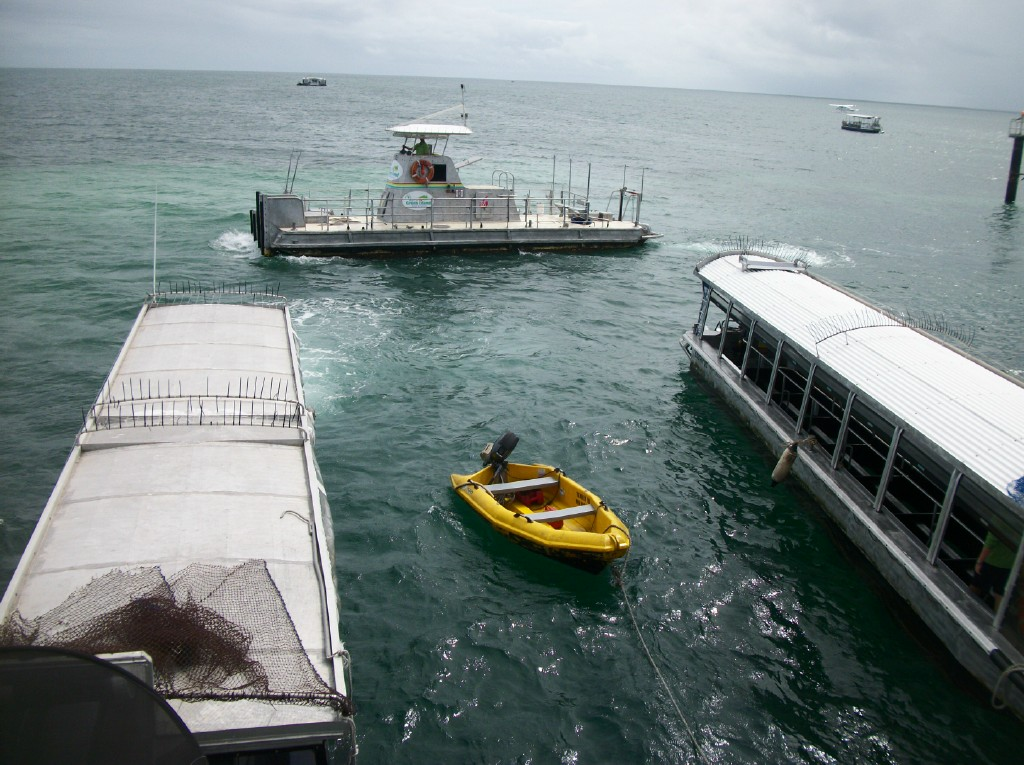
Glass bottom boats and a Semi submarine at Green Island

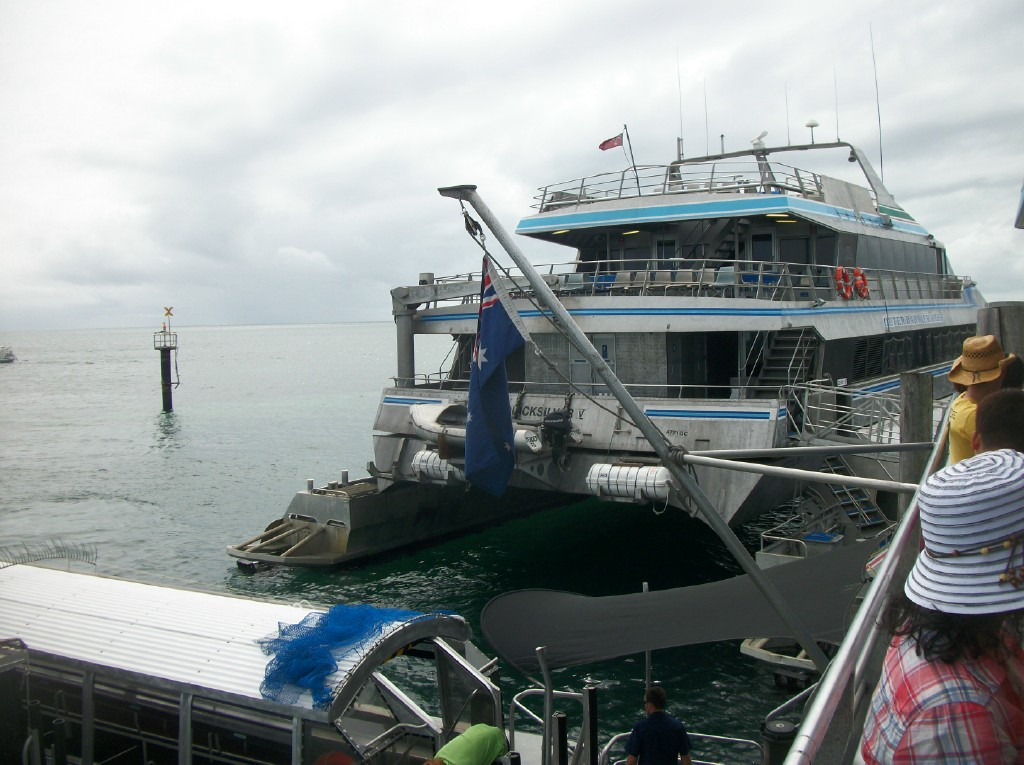
A Great Barrier Reef ferry, Green Island

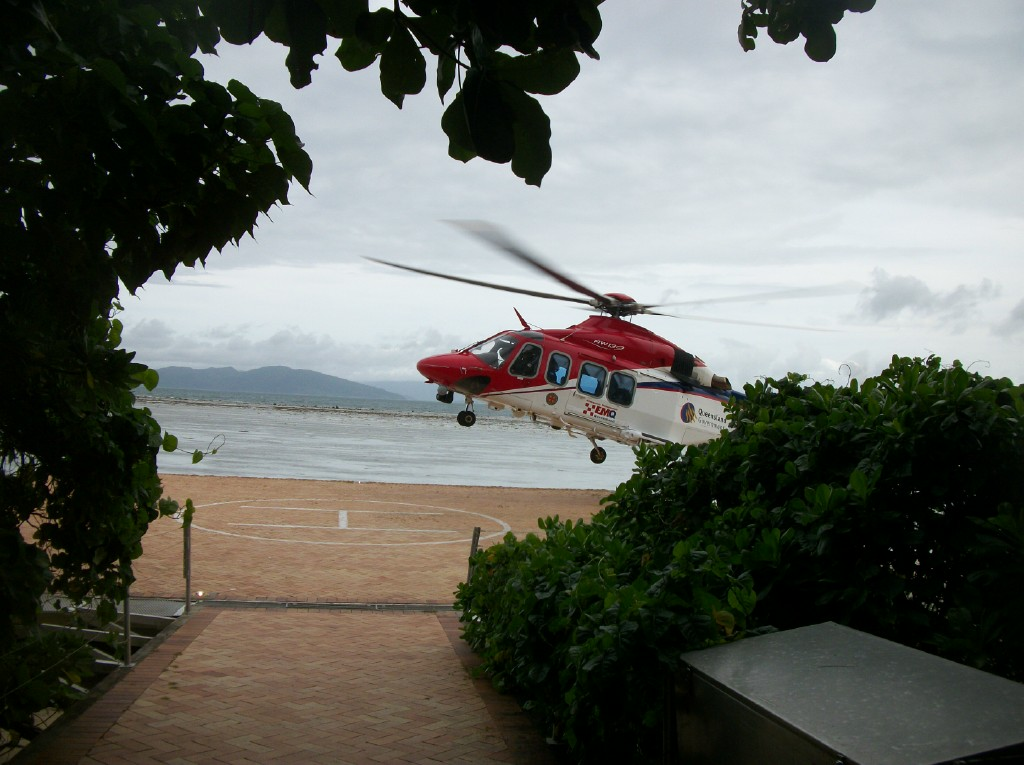
Queensland rescue helicopter in Green Island

The island was formed approximately 6,000 years ago by waves depositing sand, coral and other debris onto its coral foundations.

Local Aboriginal language speakers (Roy Banning, Robert Patterson, and Henry Fourmile) advised and confirmed the Gungganyji language group are especially connected with the island. To them it is named Dabuukji. Dabuukji, as a name, may refer to the island having been within local Aboriginal mythology and history a larger island with a freshwater marsh or 'hole' (later a well) at its centre. Alternatively it may be a reference to the story of the turtle which first obtained holes in its nose (nostrils) on this coral cay. It may also be a reference to some aspect of young Gungganyji male initiation rituals reported to have been conducted on this coral cay in times past.

The local Aboriginal people (particularly Dick Moses, speaking Yidinyji) say that in the Dreamtime Dabuukji (Green Island) was approximately four times the size it is now, and that the present coral cay is only the north-east portion of the whole, original island.

Local Aboriginal people have grown up with the understanding the coral cay was a place to be generally avoided, being wunjami, that is, "a place haunted by spirits".

The Queensland Government has gazetted Green Island as the cay's official name, this being the name given it by Lieutenant James Cook on 10 June 1770, either because of the appearance of the coral cay's vegetation, or possibly after Charles Green, who was an astronomer aboard the Endeavour at the time.

The first known non Aboriginal person to reside on the island was fisherman James Seton Veitch Mein in 1857 who established a beche-de-mer smoking station. Coconut palms were planted on the island in 1899 to provide food for shipwrecked sailors.

In April 1873, the Goodwill vessel arrived at Green Island with 3 European crew and 5 Manbarra people press-ganged from Palm Island to collect and process beche de mer. The Aboriginals, including 3 men and 2 women, resented their treatment and killed two of the whites and stole the "Goodwill". The third, Daniel Kelly, escaped to nearby Oyster Quay Island to report the killings to another beche-de-mer fisherman named Philip Garland. The incident was reported to authorities in Cardwell and the Queensland Police Commissioner Seymour ordered Native Police officer Robert Arthur Johnstone to organise a punitive mission.

Johnstone and his troopers sailed to the area in their police boat and found the "Goodwill" abandoned and burnt on a beach in Trinity Bay where the modern-day community of Yarrabah is now located. "The blacks were given a proper warm reception" when Johnstone arrived and after proceeding inland for 3 miles his troopers dispersed another group of local Yidinji people first by firing on them from a distance and then charging amongst them. Johnstone's section then sailed to the mouth of what is now called the Mulgrave River and dispersed "a large mob of blacks" with gunfire. They then sailed further south to the Gladys Inlet (which is now known as the Johnstone River) where a large group of Aboriginals led by a very tall man decorated with pipeclay resisted the troopers' approach. Johnstone punished their "insolence" with gunfire and this leader was one of those killed in the shooting.

In July 1873, four workers, including the owner James Mercer, at another beche-de-mer fishing station on Green Island were killed by press-ganged Manbarra labourers. These Palm Island natives were denied food rations for their work and subsequently killed their overseers in revenge. The record is unclear on whether another punitive mission was organised but the regional newspapers at the time were strong in their contempt for the Manbarra people and hoped for their "final extermination" whether it be by bullets or by rum.

Since the early 20th century, tourism has been the main activity on the island. A guest house was originally built in the 1930s and an underwater observatory was installed in 1954.

In 1970 Queen Elizabeth II, The Duke of Edinburgh and Her Royal Highness Princess Anne toured Australia including Queensland. The Queensland tour began on Sunday 12 April when the royal yacht Britannia entered Moreton Bay at Caloundra, sailing into Newstead Wharf. After visiting Brisbane, Longreach and Mount Isa the Royal Family travelled to Mackay. The royal party had a leisurely cruise to Townsville. According to the formal schedule, the Royal Yacht Britannia arrived off Green Island on the morning of 21 April, after leaving Townsville the day before. The scheduled visit to Green Island was dependent on the weather. All three members of the Royal family were taken by Royal Barge to the Green Island jetty. The visit only lasted 30mins, before Britannia left for Cooktown by 10:15am the same day.

The current resort, Green Island Reef Resort, was opened in 1994.

A seawater desalination plant was commissioned to supply water to the resort in 2001. The plant supplies 55 kL/d of potable water, and returns waste brine to the sea.

== Demographics ==
In the 2016 census, Green Island had a population of 25 people.

In the 2021 census, Green Island had a population of 20 people.

== Education ==
There are no schools on Green Island. The nearest government schools are in Cairns. Distance education and boarding schools are other options.

== Transport ==
Commercial charter boats, helicopter and seaplane services all provide transport to the island. The island is reachable by a 45-minute catamaran ride from the mainland city of Cairns.

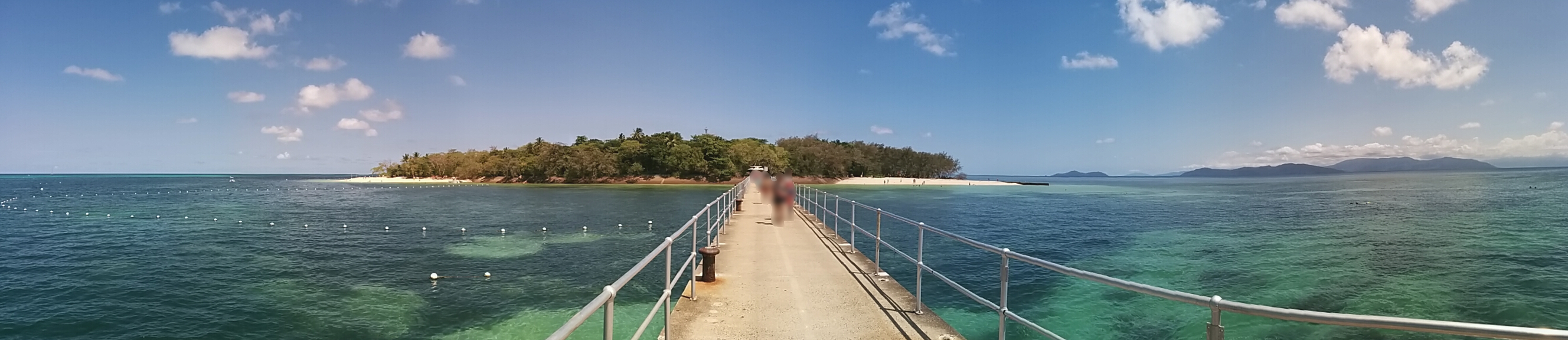
Panorama of Green Island

== See also ==
- List of islands of Australia
