= Urie Lingey =

One of the Shetland Islands

Coordinates: 60°38′N 0°55′W

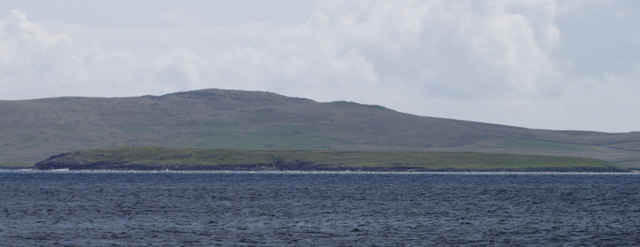
Urie Lingey with Fetlar in the background.

Urie Lingey is one of the Shetland Islands. It is between Fetlar and Unst, and Yell is to the west.

== Geography ==
Urie Lingey is 1 km north of Urie Ness on Fetlar , whence the name. Lingey means a "heather island".

Daaey is to the south east, and Sound Gruney to the west. Wedder Holm is to the north east.

== See also ==
- List of islands of Scotland
