= Green Isle =

Green Isle may refer to a community in the United States:

- Green Isle, Minnesota
- Green Isle Township, Sibley County, Minnesota

== See also ==
- Emerald Isle (disambiguation)
