= Green Island, Nebraska =

Strahmburg was on Green Island
- Abandoned town
- Nickname: Green Island
- Location within the state of Nebraska
- Coordinates: 42°50′39.3″N 97°23′13.6″W
- Country: United States
- State: Nebraska
- County: Cedar
- Time zone: UTC-6 (Central (CST))
  - Summer (DST): UTC-5 (CDT)
- Area code: 402

Green Island, 10.5 square miles of land in northwestern Cedar County, Nebraska bordering the Missouri River across from Yankton, SD, was home to Strahmburg a former town on the island. Green Island and Strahmburg have had their names used interchangeably over the years because, in part, the post office in Strahmburg was officially designated as Green Island. Supposedly Green Island acquired its name came the color of its lush vegetation. Though called an island, it was physically connected to Nebraska by a swampy, low-lying area along its southern edge. Both were destroyed by the Great Flood of 1881 on the Missouri. Their history is better understood knowing the braided, meandering, flood-prone history of the Missouri River in that area. Completion of Gavins Point Dam in 1957, 5 miles upriver from the former location of Strahmburg, greatly reduced the risk of floods on the river. Today the Missouri National Recreational River, 59-miles between Gavins Point Dam and Ponca State Park, has restrictions on commercial development. Early maps indicate the presence of numerous islands some of which, like Green Island, no longer exist.

== History ==
Green Island was first settled by Sabie Strahm, an enterprising Swiss immigrant who squatted there in 1857. On March 1, 1862, Strahm obtained 182 acres bordering the river via military warrant. Likely because much of this land was lost to the Missouri, Strahm purchased 320 acres via the agricultural scrip process further from the river on November 10, 1868 and platted Strahmburg on this land in 1872. It was 6 to 15 above river level, thought to be above flood level.

Yankton, SD, established in 1858 across the river from Green Island, became a busy river port in the 1860s and 1870s. By 1876 a steam-driven ferry operated between Yankton and Green Island, and Stramburg was one of three recorded towns in Cedar County, St. James and St. Helena being the others.

The 1880 federal census listed 63 people living in Strahmburg, including 13 families, 2 blacksmiths, carpenters and teachers, a shoemaker, steamboater, hotel keeper, minister and merchant, 3 stage drivers, and 4 farmers. Among the farmers was Saby Strahm, born in Switzerland, the only inhabitant not born in the U.S. By the time of the 1881 flood, Green Island had 150 inhabitants and Strahmburg had the Green Island post office, about 15 dwellings, a blacksmith shop, a hotel/restaurant, 2 general stores and churches, and a school. The school, District 3 organized in 1875, had 67 students in 1880. It was called Green Island School until 1928 when it became known as Aten School eventually closing in 1980.

The first post office on Green Island was Elm Grove established May 1, 1858 on the Nebraska side of the river about one mile west of Yankton. It was discontinued October 1, 1868. The next post office, called Green Island but located in Strahmburg, was established January 7, 1871 with Saby Strahm as postmaster. This post office, wiped out by the 1881 flood, was replaced by Aten on June 11, 1882 where it continued until July 3, 1906.

The Great Flood of 1881, caused by heavy snowmelt in the Dakotas and ice jams on the Missouri, resulted in 400 miles of destruction from Pierre, SD to Omaha, NE. The Missouri was reportedly 20 miles wide in portions of the Yankton/Green Island area and rose 41 feet in a matter of hours due to an ice jam a few miles below Yankton. Water began rising in Yankton and on Green Island about 4:00 PM Tuesday, March 30, 1881, and the ice broke at 11:30 AM March 31. Subsequent ice jams and flooding continued until mid-April. Major damage including the destruction of several steamboats occurred in Yankton. Reports vary, but from zero to three people died in the flood. Strahmburg and the farms on Green Island were completely destroyed and total loss of property on Green Island, real and personal, was estimated at $100,000.

Strahmburg made a temporary recovery when 2 hotels, a blacksmith shop and a house or two were built on the old townsite and a new steam ferry connecting Green Island with Yankton began service April 18, 1882. But recovery did not last and Aten, Nebraska, which had been established soon after the flood, replaced Strahmburg as the place of business and social activity on Green Island. Aten, situated 3 miles west of Strahmburg on high ground a mile from the river, was named after John Aten, a state senator and its first postmaster. Today, Green Island is farming and recreation area, with Aten and South Yankton, NE the nearest populated places to the former Strahmburg.
