= Political divisions of Kannur district =

Local bodies in Kannur district

Kannur district is politically organized into a complex web of taluks, blocks, panchayaths and villages. In addition, there are also parliamentary divisions called Assembly constituencies and Lok Sabha constituencies.

== History ==
Kannur district came into existence as an administrative unit on 1 January 1957, when the erstwhile Malabar District and Kasaragod taluk of Madras state were reconstituted into three revenue districts, viz; Kannur, Kozhikode and Palakkad. At the time of its formation, the district consisted of seven taluks, viz, Kasaragod, Hosdurg, Taliparamba, Kannur, Thalassery, North Wayanad and South Wayanad. Subsequently, the South Wayanad taluk was included in Kozhikode district with effect from 15 March 1957. Later, on first November 1980, Wayanad District was formed carving out South Wayanad and North Wayanad taluks. The two northernmost taluks of Kannur District, viz; Kasaragod and Hosdurg were separated on 24 May 1984 for the formation of Kasaragod District.A new Iritty taluk was formed in 2014 dividing Thalassery and Thaliparamba taluks and Payyanur Taluk was created by carving Taliparamba taluk and Kannur taluk in 2018. Thus Kannur District now has five taluks, viz., Kannur, Taliparamba, Payyanur, Thalassery and Iritty. Thalassery is also known as Tellicherry.

There are nine development blocks comprising 71 grama panchayats. The development blocks are Kannur, Edakkad, Irikkur, Iritty, Kuthuparamba, Payyannur, Peravoor, Taliparamba and Thalassery.

There is one municipal corporation and 9 municipalities in Kannur district. Kannur is the only municipal corporation and the municipalities are Thalassery, Taliparamba, Payyannur, Kuthuparamba, Mattannur, Anthoor, Panoor, Iritty, and Sreekandapuram.

The state legislative constituencies of the District are: Irikkur, Payyanur, Taliparamba, Kalliasseri, Azhikode, Kannur, Dharmadom, Thalassery, Mattanur, Kuthuparamba and Peravoor.

== Parliament Constituency ==
Kannur district falls into 3 parliament constituencies.

• Kannur

• Kasaragod

• Vatakara

== Assembly Constituencies ==
Kannur district have 11 Assembly constituencies:

1. Payyanur
2. Kalliasseri
3. Taliparamba
4. Azhikode
5. Kannur
6. Irikkur
7. Thalassery
8. Dharmadom
9. Mattanur
10. Kuthuparamba
11. Peravoor

== Members of Parliament ==
Madras State

- 1951: A.K. Gopalan, Communist Party of India

After the formation of Kerala

- 1977: C.K. Chandrappan, Communist Party of India
- 1980: K. Kunhambu, Indian National Congress (Urs)
- 1984: Mullappally Ramachandran, Indian National Congress
- 1989: Mullappally Ramachandran, Indian National Congress
- 1991: Mullappally Ramachandran, Indian National Congress
- 1996: Mullappally Ramachandran, Indian National Congress
- 1998: Mullappally Ramachandran, Indian National Congress
- 1999: A.P. Abdullakutty, Communist Party of India (Marxist)
- 2004: A.P. Abdullakutty, Communist Party of India (Marxist)
- 2009: K. Sudhakaran, Indian National Congress
- 2014: P K Sreemathy, Communist Party of India (Marxist)
- 2019: K. Sudhakaran, Indian National Congress
- 2024: K. Sudhakaran, Indian National Congress

Indian general election, 2024

Left Democratic Front (LDF) fielded veteran M. V. Jayarajan against incumbent MP and senior Congress leader K. Sudhakaran. BJP's C. Raghunathan contested from NDA.

=== General Election 2024 ===
2024 Indian general election: Kannur
Party	Candidate	Votes	%	±%
INC	K. Sudhakaran	518,524	48.74	▼2.00
CPI(M)	M. V. Jayarajan	4,09,542	38.50	▼3.18
BJP	C. Raghunathan	1,19,876	11.27	▲4.71
NOTA	None of the above	8,873	0.83	
Majority		1,08,982	10.24	▲1.18
Turnout		10,66,171	78.22	▼5.06
Registered electors				
INC hold		Swing	▼2.00	

== Taluks of Kannur district ==
Kannur district is divided into five taluks, Thalassery, Kannur, Iritty, Taliparamba and Payyannur. Thalassery has 35 villages, Kannur has 28 villages, Iritty has 20 villages, Taliparamba has 28 and Payyanur has 22 villages.

=== Kannur ===
The taluk office of Kannur is located at South Bazar or Caltex junction in Kannur. The headquarters is in an old British building near to the modern civil station. Constituent villages Kannur Taluk has 28 villages.

- Anjarakandi, Azhikode North, Azhikode South and Chelora
- Chembilode, Cherukkunnu and Chirakkal
- Edakkad, Elayavoor, Iriveri and Kadambur
- Kalliasseri, Kanhirod, Kannadiparamba, Kannapuram
- Kannur-1, Kannur-2, Makrery and Mattool
- Mavilayi, Munderi, Muzhappilangad and Narath
- Pallikkunnu, Pappinisseri, Puzhathi, Valapattanam and Valiyannur

Kannur taluk is an administrative division of Kannur district of Kerala, India.

=== Taliparamba ===
The headquarters of Taliparamba Taluk is located in Taliparamba.

Taliparamba Taluk has 28 villages

- Alakode, Anthoor, Chelery and Chengalayi
- Chuzhali, Eruvessi and Irikkur
- Kayaralam, Kolachery, Kooveri, Kurumathur, Kuttiyattoor
- Kuttiyeri, Malappattam, Maniyoor, Mayyil and Morazha
- Naduvil, Nidiyanga, Panniyoor, Pariyaram, Pattuvam and Payyavoor
- Sreekandapuram, Taliparamba, Thimiri, Udayagiri and Velladu

Taliparamba is home to a number of temples, churches and mosques. Temples include the Rajarajeshwara Temple, Trichambaram Temple and Parassinikkadavu Temple. Taliparamba Juma Masjid and St. Mary's Church are other prominent religious centres in the town.

=== Thalassery ===
Thalassery Taluk has 35 villages.

- Cheruvanchery, Chokli, Dharmadam and Erancholi
- Eruvatty, Kadirur, Kandankunnu and Kannavam
- Keezhallur, Kodiyeri, Kolavallur and Kolayad
- Koodali, Kottayam, Kuthuparamba and Mananthery
- Mangattidam, Mokery, New Mahe and Paduvilayi
- Panniyannur, Panoor, Pathiriyad and Pattanur
- Pattiam, Peringalam, Peringathur and Pinarayi
- Puthur, Shivapuram, Thalassery and Thiruvangad
- Tholambra, Thripangothur and Vekkalam Kuthuparamba Vengad

=== Iritty ===
Iritty Taluk has 20 villages

- Aralam, Ayyankunnu, Chavasseri and Kalliad
- Kanichar, Karikottakari, Keezhur and Kelakam
- Kolari, Kottiyoor, Manathana and Muzhakkunnu
- Nuchiyad, Padiyoor, Payam and Pazhassi
- Thillankeri, Vayathur, Vellarvalli and Vilamana

=== Payyanur ===
Payyanur taluk has 22 villages

- Alappadamba, Cheruthazham,

Eramam, Ezhome

- Kadannnappally, Kankol, Karivellur, Korom
- Kuttur, Kunhimangalam, Madayi, Panappuzha
- Payyanur, Peralam, Peringome, Perinthatta, Pulingome
- Ramanthali, Thirumeni, Vayakkara, Vellora, Vellur

== Eastern villages ==
- Cherupuzha
- Pulingome
- Udayagiri
- Alakode
- Vellad
- Naduvil
- Eruvessi
- Payyavoor
- Ulikkal
- Ayyankunnu
- Edoor
- Aralam
- Peravoor
- Kottiyoor

== See also ==
- Indian general election, 2014 (Kerala)
- Kannur
- List of constituencies of the Lok Sabha
- Thalassery
- Vatakara
