= P. Devootty =

Member of the Kerala Legislative Assembly
- In office 1980–1987
- Preceded by: Chadayan Govindan
- Constituency: Azhikode

Personal details
- Died: October 17, 1997 (aged 63) Kerala, India
- Citizenship: Indian
- Party: Communist Party of India (Marxist)

P. Devootty (1934 – 17 October 1997) was an Indian politician and social worker from Kerala who served as a Member of the Legislative Assembly (MLA) in the Kerala Legislative Assembly representing the Azhikode constituency. Devootty died on 17 October 1997 at the age of 63.

== Political career ==
In the 6th Kerala Legislative Assembly (1980–1982), she was elected after defeating T. V. Narayanan of the Indian National Congress by securing 38,985 votes. She is also the first woman MLA from Kannur district. Devootty has been the national joint secretary of the Democratic Women's Association.
