= Niranthodu =

Village in Kerala, India

Niranthodu is a small village in Mayyil Panchayath, Kannur, Kerala, India.

== Geography ==
It is a semi-hill area 20 km from Kannur town.

== Demographics ==
Two per cent of the population are government employees, 20% are farmers, 70% are men working for daily wage, and 4% are men working abroad (mainly in the Persian Gulf. 69% are Hindus, and 31% are Muslims.

== Politics ==
Party CPM (58%), Congress (39%), BJP(3%)

== Landmarks ==
There is one LP school, one Toddy shop, grocery shops, a saloon, a small hotel, a library (started by Congress in 1970) cum CPM Party office, and a Mayyil Co-op Bank branch.

== Transportation ==
The national highway passes through Valapattanam town. Goa and Mumbai can be accessed on the northern side and Cochin and Thiruvananthapuram can be accessed on the southern side. The road to the east of Iritty connects to Mysore and Bangalore. The nearest railway station is Kannur on Mangalore-Palakkad line. Trains are available to almost all parts of India subject to advance booking over the internet. There are airports at Mattanur, Mangalore and Calicut. All of them are international airports but direct flights are available only to Middle Eastern countries.
