= Kayaralam =

- village
- Location in Kerala, India Kayaralam (India)
- Coordinates: 12°0′0″N 75°25′0″E
- Country: India
- State: Kerala
- District: Kannur

Government
  - Body: Mayyil Grama Panchayat

Area
  - Total: 20.33 km^{2} (7.85 sq mi)

Population
  - Total: 17,159
  - Density: 844.0/km^{2} (2,186/sq mi)

Languages
  - Official: Malayalam, English
- Time zone: UTC+5:30 (IST)
- ISO 3166 code: IN-KL
- Vehicle registration: KL-59
- Nearest city: Mayyil
- Lok Sabha constituency: Kannur

Kayaralam is one of the villages in Mayyil Gram panchayat in the Kannur District, state of Kerala, India.

== Demographics ==
As of 2011 Census, Kayaralam had a population of 17,159 with 8,042 males (46.9%) and 9,117 females (53.1%). Kayaralam village has an area of 20.33 km^{2} (7.85 sq mi) with 3,800 families residing in it. The average male female sex ratio was 1,134 higher than state average of 1,084. In Kayaralam, 11.75% of the population was under 6 years age. Kayaralam had overall literacy of 94.1% higher than state average of 94%.

== Administration ==
Before the formation of the Mayyil panchayath, it was a panchayath. Orappadi is the nearest town.

== Transportation ==
The national highway passes through Valapattanam town. Goa and Mumbai can be accessed on the northern side and Cochin and Thiruvananthapuram can be accessed on the southern side. The road to the east of Iritty connects to Mysore and Bangalore. The nearest railway station is Kannur on Mangalore-Palakkad line. Trains are available to almost all parts of India subject to advance booking over the internet. There are airports at Mattanur, Mangalore and Calicut. All of them are international airports but direct flights are available only to Middle Eastern countries.

== Notable people ==
- Parassini Kunhiraman Nair, Kathakali artist.
