= M. V. Govindan =

Indian politician

Comrade M. V. Govindan
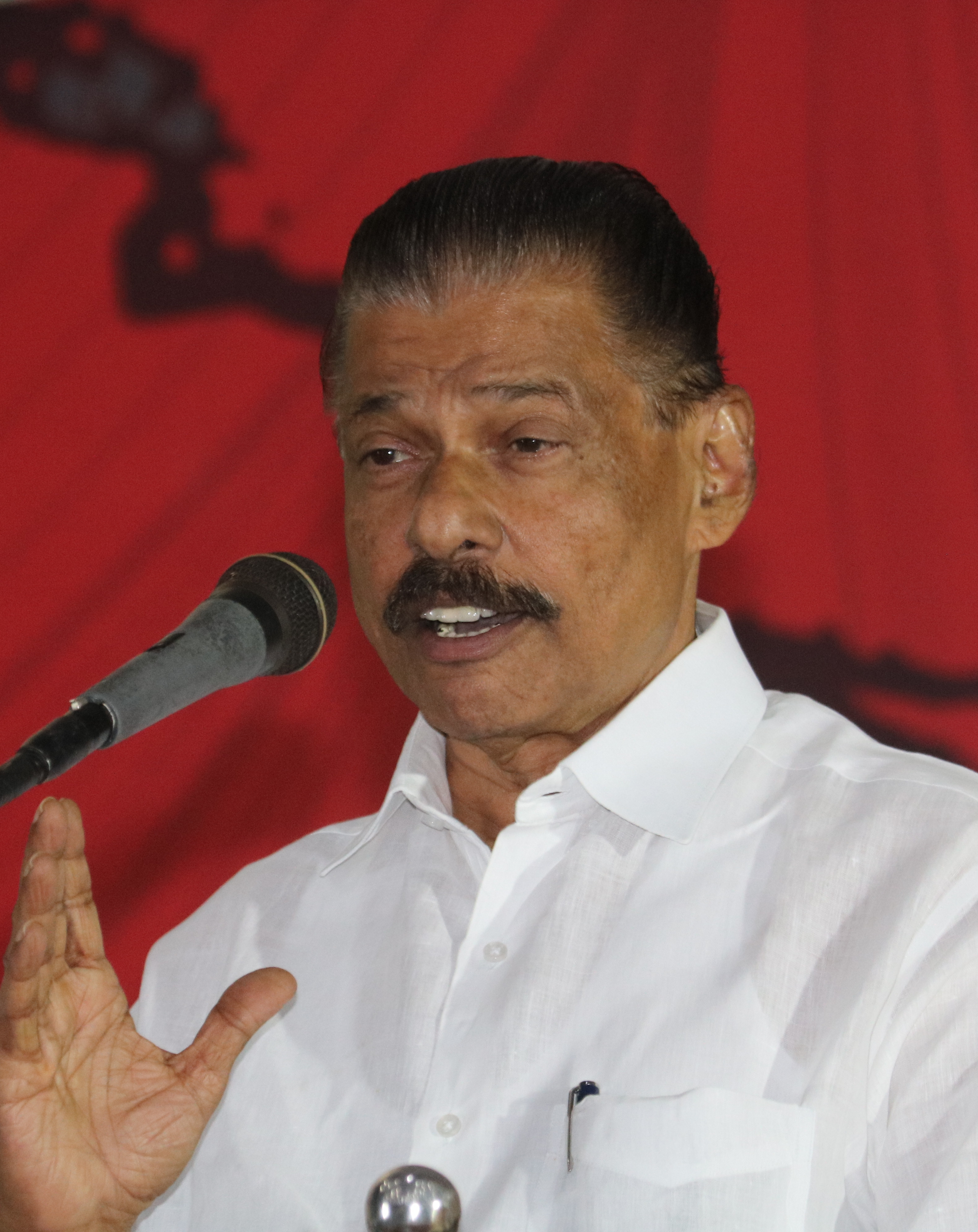

Member of the Politburo of the Communist Party of India (Marxist)
- Incumbent
- Assumed office 31 October 2022
- Preceded by: Kodiyeri Balakrishnan

Secretary of Communist Party of India (Marxist), Kerala
- Incumbent
- Assumed office 31 August 2022
- Preceded by: Kodiyeri Balakrishnan

Minister for Local Self Governments and Excise, Government of Kerala
- In office 20 May 2021 – 5 September 2022
- Chief Minister: Pinarayi Vijayan
- Preceded by: A. C. Moideen (Local Self Governments); T. P. Ramakrishnan (Excise)
- Succeeded by: M. B. Rajesh

Member of Kerala Legislative Assembly
- In office 2 May 2021 – 21 May 2026
- Preceded by: James Mathew
- Succeeded by: T K Govindan Master
- Constituency: Taliparamba

Personal details
- Born: 23 April 1953 (age 73) Morazha, Madras State, India
- Party: Communist Party of India (Marxist)
- Spouse: P. K. Shyamala
- Children: 2
- Parent(s): K. Kunjambu; M. V. Madhavi
- Education: Government College of Physical Education, Kozhikode
- Nickname: Govindhan Master

M. V. Govindan (born 23 April 1953) popularly known as Govindan Master, is an Indian politician, marxist theoretician and PT Master. He is a member of Communist Party of India (Marxist), and is the current Kerala State Secretary and the party's Politburo member since 2022. He previously served as the Cabinet Minister for Local Self-Governments and Excise in the Second Vijayan ministry from 2021 to 2022.

== Personal life ==
He was born to late K. Kunjambu and late M. V. Madhavi Amma at Morazha in Kannur on 23 April 1953. His spouse, P. K. Shyamala is the Chairperson of Anthoor Municipality and Kannur district committee member of CPI(M).They have two sons named Shyamjith & Rangeeth. He was working as a physical education teacher at Iringal UP School when he became active in politics and took voluntary retirement from the job.

== Political career ==
MV Govindan master 2024 at Kollam

He became a member of CPI(M) in 1970. He was one of the founding members of DYFI, the youth organisation associated with CPI(M). Prior to that he was KSYF Kannur President and Secretary. He was one of the five members from Kerala in the all India preparatory committee of DYFI formation. He became DYFI's first Kerala State President and later its secretary. He participated in 1986 Moscow Youth conference.

He was the Kasaragod area secretary of CPI(M) when it was still part of Kannur district. Govindan Master was arrested during the emergency and put in jail. In 1991, he became CPI(M) state committee member after the state conference in Kozhikkode. He was elected to CPI(M) state secretariat during 2006. He represented Taliparamba in Kerala legislative assembly during 1996 and 2001. He was Kannur district secretary of CPI(M) between 2002 and 2006. He had also become Ernakulam district secretary of CPI(M). Also, he was the Chief Editor of Deshabhimani, organ of CPI(M) Kerala.

=== Assembly election candidature history ===
Year	Constituency	Opponent	Result	Margin
1996	Taliparamba	Satheesan Pacheni (INC)	Won	17,617
2001	Taliparamba	K.Surendran (INC)	Won	15,287
2021	Taliparamba	Abdul Rasheed V. P. (INC)	Won	22,689

After the historic 2021 election of Kerala, the Left Democratic Front (LDF) retained power with 99 seats, 8 more than in the previous election, marking the first time that an alliance won consecutive terms in the state since the 1977 election. Following the election M. V. Govindan was sworn in as the Minister for Local Self Governments and Excise. On 28 August 2022, state secretary of Communist Party of India (Marxist), Kerala, Kodiyeri Balakrishnan stepped down from the position due to failing health and was succeeded by M. V. Govindan and was also included in the Polit Bureau of the Communist Party of India (Marxist).

== See also ==
- Communist Party of India (Marxist), Kerala
