= Azhikode Assembly constituency =

Constituency of the Kerala legislative assembly in India

Coordinates: 11.92°N 75.33°E

Azhikode
- Constituency No. 10 for the Kerala Legislative Assembly
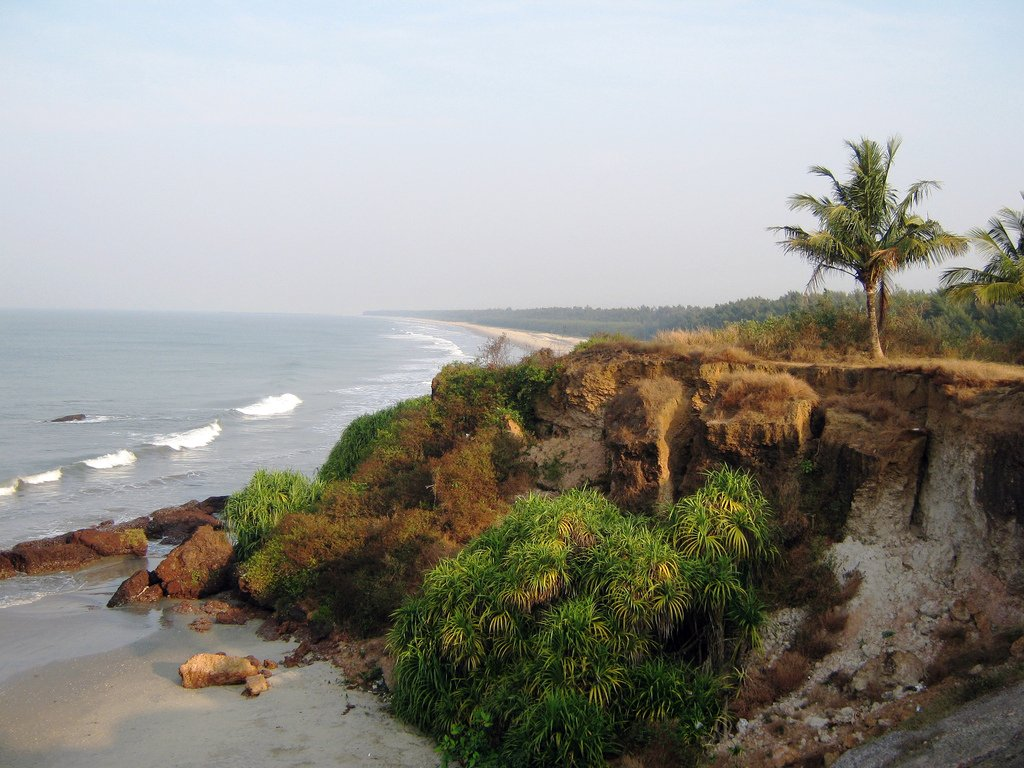
- Meenkunnu beach in Azhikode (State Assembly constituency)

Constituency details
- Country: India
- Region: South India
- State: Kerala
- District: Kannur
- Established: 1977
- Total electors: 1,81,562 (2021)
- Reservation: None

Member of Legislative Assembly
- 16th Kerala Legislative Assembly
- Incumbent K. V. Sumesh
- Party: CPIM
- Alliance: LDF
- Elected year: 2026

Azhikode State assembly constituency is one of the 140 state legislative assembly constituencies in Kerala in southern India. It is also one of the seven state legislative assembly constituencies included in Kannur Lok Sabha constituency. It is a Thiyyar dominated constituency. As of the 2026 assembly elections, the current MLA is K. V. Sumesh of CPI(M).

== Local self-governed segments ==
Azhikode Assembly constituency is composed of the following 15 wards of the Kannur Municipal Corporation (Pallikunnu zone and Puzhathi zone) in Kannur Taluk, and five Gram Panchayats in the same Taluk:

Wards of Kannur Municipal Corporation in Azhikode Constituency
| Ward no. | Name | Ward no. | Name | Ward no. | Name |
|---|---|---|---|---|---|
| 1 | Palliyammoola | 2 | Kunnav | 3 | Kokkenpara |
| 4 | Pallikunnu | 5 | Talap | 6 | Udayamkunnu |
| 7 | Podikundu | 8 | Kottali | 9 | Athazhakunnu |
| 10 | Kakkad | 11 | Thulicheri | 12 | Kakkad North |
| 13 | Shadulippalli | 54 | Chalad | 55 | Panjikkayil |

Other Local Bodies in Azhikode Constituency
| Name | Local Body Type | Taluk |
|---|---|---|
| Azhikode | Grama panchayat | Kannur |
| Chirakkal | Grama panchayat | Kannur |
| Narath | Grama panchayat | Kannur |
| Pappinisseri | Grama panchayat | Kannur |
| Valappattanam | Grama panchayat | Kannur |

== Members of Legislative Assembly ==
The following list contains all members of Kerala Legislative Assembly who have represented Azhikode Assembly constituency during the period of various assemblies:

| Election | Niyama Sabha | Member | Party | Tenure |
|---|---|---|---|---|
| 1977 | 5th | Chadayan Govindan | CPI(M) | 1977–1980 |
| 1980 | 6th | P. Devootty | CPI(M) | 1980–1982 |
| 1982 | 7th | P. Devootty | CPI(M) | 1982–1987 |
| 1987 | 8th | M. V. Raghavan | CMP | 1987–1991 |
| 1991 | 9th | E. P. Jayarajan | CPI(M) | 1991–1996 |
| 1996 | 10th | T. K. Balan | CPI(M) | 1996–2001 |
| 2001 | 11th | T. K. Balan | CPI(M) | 2001–2005 |
| 2005* | 11th | M. Prakashan Master | CPI(M) | 2005–2006 |
| 2006 | 12th | M. Prakashan Master | CPI(M) | 2006–2011 |
Major boundary changes
| 2011 | 13th | K. M. Shaji | IUML | 2011–2016 |
| 2016 | 14th | K. M. Shaji | IUML | 2016–2021 |
| 2021 | 15th | K. V. Sumesh | CPI(M) | 2021–2026 |
| 2026 | 16th | K. V. Sumesh | CPI(M) | 2026– |

== Election results ==
Percentage change (±%) denotes the change in the number of votes from the immediate previous election.

=== 2026 ===
2026 Kerala Legislative Assembly election: Azhikode
| Party | Candidate | Votes | % | ±% |
|---|---|---|---|---|
| CPI(M) | K. V. Sumesh | 64,951 | 43.76 | ▼1.65 |
| IUML | Kareem Cheleri | 64,602 | 43.53 | ▲2.36 |
| BJP | K. K. Vinod Kumar | 17,476 | 11.78 | ▲0.92 |
| Independent | Abdul Kareem V. V. | 235 | 0.16 | |
| SUCI(C) | Reshmi Ravi | 227 | 0.15 | ▼0.01 |
| Independent | Sumesh T. P. | 124 | 0.08 | |
| Independent | Kareem Chandroth | 115 | 0.08 | |
| Independent | Sumesh Kumar K. | 106 | 0.07 | |
| NOTA | None of the above | 576 | 0.39 | ▲0.03 |
| Margin of victory | | 349 | 0.23 | ▼4.01 |
| Turnout | | 1,48,412 | 78.50 | ▼1.30 |
| CPI(M) hold | | Swing | ▼1.65 | |

| Local Body | Booths | UDF Votes | LDF Votes | NDA/BJP Votes | Leader | Lead |
| Azhikode | 32 | 9,726 | 12,962 | 3,328 | LDF | 3,236 |
| Pappinisseri | 37 | 11,659 | 14,293 | 2,436 | LDF | 2,634 |
| Narath | 28 | 12,347 | 9,464 | 1,558 | UDF | 2,883 |
| Chirakkal | 19 | 6,316 | 7,116 | 2,611 | LDF | 800 |
| Valapattanam | 6 | 3,361 | 1,580 | 359 | UDF | 1,781 |
| Kannur Corporation | 63 | 20,446 | 18,442 | 6,929 | UDF | 2,004 |
| TOTAL | 185 | 63,855 | 63,857 | 17,221 | LDF | 2 |

=== 2021 ===
There were 181,562 registered voters in Azhikode Assembly constituency for the 2021 Kerala Legislative Assembly election.

2021 Kerala Legislative Assembly election: Azhikode
| Party | Candidate | Votes | % | ±% |
|---|---|---|---|---|
| CPI(M) | K. V. Sumesh | 65.794 | 45.41 | ▲2.44 |
| IUML | K. M. Shaji | 59,653 | 41.17 | ▼3.41 |
| BJP | K. Ranjith | 15,741 | 10.86 | ▲1.97 |
| SDPI | Abdul Jabbar K.K | 2,357 | 1.63 | ▲0.43 |
| NOTA | None of the above | 517 | 0.36 | ▲0.04 |
| Independent | K.M. Shaji (Mamba) | 277 | 0.19 | N/A |
| SUCI(C) | Resmi Ravi | 226 | 0.16 | N/A |
| Independent | Sumesh M | 180 | 0.12 | N/A |
| Independent | Prasad V.P | 104 | 0.07 | N/A |
| Independent | Pavithran Kurikkalat | 48 | 0.03 | N/A |
| Majority | | 6,141 | 4.24 | ▲2.63 |
| Turnout | | 144,897 | 79.8 | ▼2.11 |
| Registered electors | | 181,562 | | |
| CPI(M) gain from IUML | | Swing | | |

=== 2016 ===
There were 1,72,757 registered voters in Azhikode Constituency for the 2016 Kerala Assembly election.

2016 Kerala Legislative Assembly election: Azhikode
| Party | Candidate | Votes | % | ±% |
|---|---|---|---|---|
| IUML | K. M. Shaji | 63,082 | 44.58% | ▼0.63 |
| CPI(M) | M. V. Nikesh Kumar | 60,795 | 42.97% | ▼1.83 |
| BJP | A. V. Kesavan | 12,580 | 8.89% | ▲2.70 |
| SDPI | K. K. Abdul Jabbar | 1,705 | 1.20% | N/A |
| Independent | P. K. Ragesh | 1,518 | 1.07% | N/A |
| WPOI | M. Joseph John | 687 | 0.49% | N/A |
| NOTA | None of the above | 453 | 0.32% | N/A |
| SUCI(C) | P. C. Vivek | 235 | 0.17% | ▼0.17 |
| Independent | Shaji K. M. Tholambra | 196 | 0.14% | N/A |
| Independent | K. M. Shaji, Mamba | 160 | 0.11% | N/A |
| Independent | Prasad V. P. | 87 | 0.06% | N/A |
| Margin of victory | | 2,287 | 1.61% | ▲1.20 |
| Turnout | | 1,41,498 | 81.91% | ▼0.53 |
| IUML hold | | Swing | ▼0.63 | |

=== 2011 ===
After the delimitation,major parts of previous azhikode constituency was merged into newly formed Kalliasseri Constituency ,where as major parts included in Kannur was introduced into Azhikode,thus reintregating the profile of the constituency.There were 1,47,782 registered voters in Azhikode Constituency for the 2011 Kerala Assembly election.

2011 Kerala Legislative Assembly election: Azhikode
| Party | Candidate | Votes | % | ±% |
|---|---|---|---|---|
| IUML | K. M. Shaji | 55,077 | 45.21% | |
| CPI(M) | M. Prakashan Master | 54,584 | 44.80% | |
| BJP | M. K. Saseendran Master | 7,540 | 6.19% | |
| Independent | Noushad Punnakkal | 2,935 | 2.41% | |
| Independent | Shaji K. M. | 602 | 0.49% | |
| BSP | C. Balakrishnan | 458 | 0.38% | |
| SUCI(C) | Paul T. Samuel | 414 | 0.34% | |
| Independent | Prakashan Kuzhiparambil | 222 | 0.18% | |
| Margin of victory | | 493 | 0.41% | |
| Turnout | | 1,21,832 | 82.44% | |
| IUML gain from CPI(M) | | Swing | | |

== See also ==
- Azhikode
- Kannur district
- List of constituencies of the Kerala Legislative Assembly
- 2016 Kerala Legislative Assembly election
