= K. M. Shaji =

Indian politician

K. M. Shaji കെ.എം. ഷാജി
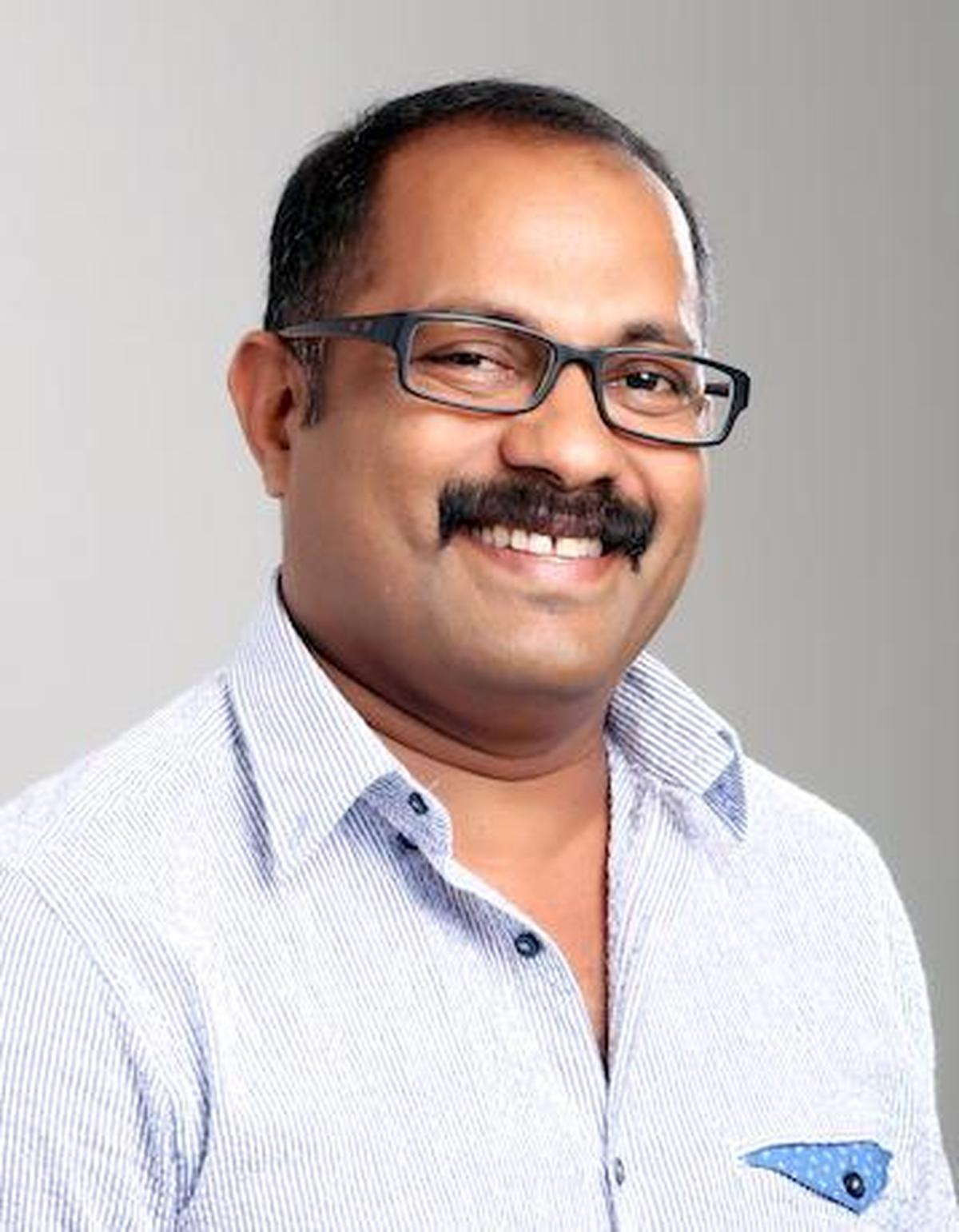

Minister for Local Self-Governments, Government of Kerala
- Incumbent
- Assumed office 19 May 2026
- Governor: Rajendra Arlekar
- Chief minister: V.D. Satheesan
- Portfolio (s): List: Local Self Governments; Panchayat, Municipality, Corporation; Town Planning; Rural development; Regional Development Authorities; KILA
- Preceded by: M.B. Rajesh

President of the Kerala Muslim Youth League
- In office 2007 – 2011
- Preceded by: Syed Sadiqali Shihab Thangal
- Succeeded by: Adv. P. M. Sadiqali

Member of the Kerala Legislative Assembly
- In office 2011 – 2021
- Succeeded by: K. V. Sumesh Communist Party of India (Marxist)
- Constituency: Azhikode

Personal details
- Born: 22 December 1971 (age 54) Kaniyambetta, Wayanad, Kerala, India
- Party: Indian Union Muslim League
- Occupation: Politician

K. M. Shaji (born 22 December 1971) is an Indian politician belonging to the Indian Union Muslim League who is currently serving as the Minister for Local Self-Governments, in the Government of Kerala. He is the president of Muslim Youth League in Kerala, a secretariat member of the League, and the treasurer of the Muslim League parliamentary party.

He was disqualified as an MLA by the High Court of Kerala on 9 November 2018 on allegations of communalizing the 2016 assembly election held in the Azhikode assembly constituency, which was later stayed by the Supreme Court of India.

== Personal life ==
Son of Shri K.M. Beeran Kutty and Smt. P.C. Aysha Kutty; born at Kaniyambetta. He was married to Smt. Asha K.M and the couple have one daughter and two sons. He had done Pre-Degree and B.B.A. (not completed).

== Political career ==
He serves as a secretariat member of the League and previously held the position of President of the Muslim Youth League in Kerala.

A powerful and articulate orator, Shaji has often been at the centre of political debates for his strong opposition to communal ideologies. His positions have drawn criticism and, at times, threats from groups such as Jamaat-e-Islami and the CPM. He has also been an active writer, contributing several articles against anti-secular forces, many of which were published in the Mathrubhumi daily.

Shaji’s leadership journey began early. He possesses a strong background in student governance, having served as the Chairman of the Calicut University Union and as the School Leader at G.H.S. Kaniyambetta."

He later entered local governance, serving as both Vice President and President of the Kaniyampetta Grama Panchayat. These roles helped establish him as a grassroots leader within the Youth League and the Muslim League.

He gained wider political attention when he contested the Iravipuram constituency in Kollam against RSP leader A. A. Aziz, though he was unsuccessful. In 2011, he shifted to the Azhikode constituency, where he registered a decisive victory. He retained the seat in 2016, defeating CPM candidate M. V. Nikesh Kumar. However, in the 2021 Kerala Assembly elections, he was defeated by CPI(M) candidate K. V. Sumesh.

=== Assembly election candidature history ===
Year	Constituency	Opponent	Result	Margin
2006	Eravipuram	A. A. Aziz (RSP)	Lost	24,049
2011	Azhikode	M. Prakashan Master (CPI(M))	Won	493
2016	Azhikode	M. V. Nikesh Kumar (CPI(M))	Won	2,287
2021	Azhikode	K. V. Sumesh (CPI(M))	Lost	6,141
2026	Vengara	Sabah Kundupuzhakkal (Independent)	Won	30,325

== Vigilance Raid ==
The Vigilance and Anti-Corruption Bureau (VACB) has seized Rs 50 lakh in a raid conducted on 12 April 2021, Monday at his house at Manal, near Azhikode in Kannur.

The vigilance team conducted raids simultaneously at his houses at Kannur and Kozhikode for allegedly amassing assets disproportionate to his known sources of income. The raid was conducted by the vigilance team from Kozhikode.

A court here in November last had ordered a Vigilance probe against the Azhikode MLA on allegations that he amassed assets disproportionate to his known sources of income.

The court's direction came on a petition by the social worker and lawyer M R Hareesh alleging that Shaji had amassed wealth disproportionate to his known sources of income and had received funds from abroad, misusing his official powers.

The petitioner, who sought a direction to the Vigilance for a probe, also alleged that Shaji filed false details regarding his wealth in his election affidavit.

The MLA has properties in Wayanad, Kannur, and Kozhikode districts, worth a minimum of Rupees two crore, the complaint alleged.

The Enforcement Directorate had also registered a case in connection with the receipt of overseas funds by Shaji and had searched his residence in Chirakkal in Kannur late last year.

Shaji claims that, he made his fortune from ginger cultivation in Karnataka and Wayanad. Ginger cultivation was not included in the affidavit on property information as it was not fixed income.

== Controversies ==
2018: On 9 November, the Kerala High Court disqualified him as an MLA for allegedly using communal appeals during the 2016 Azhikode Assembly election. However, upon appeal, the Supreme Court of India stayed the verdict, allowing him to retain his seat.

K. M. Shaji has been criticized for his anti-LGBT rhetoric. Shaji, in a speech, said that he believes the LGBTQ community to be "the worst kind of people", that homosexuality is a mental illness and that transgender people must be given counselling to become cisgender, promoting the illegal practice of conversion therapy. On another occasion, Shaji said in a speech at an IUML rally that homosexual people are akin to psychopaths and pedophiles.

== See also ==
- Indian Union Muslim League
- Muslim Youth League
