= Kannur Lok Sabha constituency =

Lok Sabha Constituency in Kerala

Coordinates: 11.87°N 75.37°E

Kannur KL-2
- Lok Sabha constituency
- Kannur Lok Sabha constituency

Constituency details
- Country: India
- Region: South India
- State: Kerala
- Assembly constituencies: Taliparamba; Irikkur; Azhikode; Kannur; Dharmadam; Mattanur; Peravoor
- Established: 1952
- Total electors: 12,62,144 (2019)
- Reservation: None

Member of Parliament
- 18th Lok Sabha
- Incumbent K. Sudhakaran
- Party: INC
- Alliance: UDF
- Elected year: 2024
- Preceded by: P. K. Sreemathy

Kannur Lok Sabha constituency is one of the 20 Lok Sabha (parliamentary) constituencies in Kerala state in southern India.

== Assembly segments ==
Kannur Lok Sabha constituency is composed of the following assembly segments:

| # | Name | District | Member | Party | 2024 Lead |
|---|---|---|---|---|---|
| 8 | Taliparamba | Kannur | T K Govindan Master | IND | INC |
| 9 | Irikkur | Kannur | Sajeev Joseph | INC | INC |
| 10 | Azhikode | Kannur | K. V. Sumesh | CPI(M) | INC |
| 11 | Kannur | Kannur | T. O. Mohanan | INC | INC |
| 12 | Dharmadam | Kannur | Pinarayi Vijayan | CPI(M) | CPI(M) |
| 15 | Mattanur | Kannur | V. K. Sanoj | CPI(M) | CPI(M) |
| 16 | Peravoor | Kannur | Adv. Sunny Joseph | INC | INC |

== Members of Parliament ==
| Year | Member | Party |
|---|---|---|
| 1952 | A. K. Gopalan | Communist Party of India |
As Thalassery
| 1957 | M. K. Jinachandran | Indian National Congress |
| 1962 | S. K. Pottekkatt | Independent |
| 1967 | Pattiam Gopalan | Communist Party of India (Marxist) |
| 1971 | C.K. Chandrappan | Communist Party of India |
As Cannanore
| 1977 | C.K. Chandrappan | Communist Party of India |
| 1980 | K. Kunhambu | Indian National Congress (U) |
| 1984 | Mullappally Ramachandran | Indian National Congress |
| 1989 | Mullappally Ramachandran | Indian National Congress |
| 1991 | Mullappally Ramachandran | Indian National Congress |
| 1996 | Mullappally Ramachandran | Indian National Congress |
| 1998 | Mullappally Ramachandran | Indian National Congress |
| 1999 | A. P. Abdullakutty | Communist Party of India (Marxist) |
| 2004 | A. P. Abdullakutty | Communist Party of India (Marxist) |
As Kannur
| 2009 | K. Sudhakaran | Indian National Congress |
| 2014 | P. K. Sreemathy | Communist Party of India (Marxist) |
| 2019 | K. Sudhakaran | Indian National Congress |
| 2024 | K. Sudhakaran | Indian National Congress |

== Election results ==
Vote share of Winning candidates
| 2024 | 48.74% |
| 2019 | 50.74% |
| 2014 | 45.15% |
| 2009 | 50.11% |
| 2004 | 50.53% |
| 1999 | 48.67% |
| 1998 | 43.91% |
| 1996 | 49.07% |
| 1991 | 50.58% |
| 1989 | 50.30% |
| 1984 | 51.66% |
| 1980 | 57.70% |
| 1977 | 50.38% |
| 1971 | 51.41% |
| 1967 | 61.76% |
| 1962 | 58.81% |
| 1957 | 37.15% |

Percentage change (±) denotes the change in the number of votes from the immediate previous election.

Kannur Lok Sabha constituency is one of the 20 Lok Sabha (parliamentary) constituencies in Kerala state in southern India.

=== General Election 2029 ===
2029 Indian general election: Kannur
| Party | Candidate | Votes | % | ±% |
|---|---|---|---|---|
| UDF | | | | |
| LDF | | | | |
| NDA | | | | |
| NOTA | None of the above | | | |
| Margin of victory | | | | |
| Turnout | | | | |
| | | Swing | | |

=== General Election 2024 ===
2024 Indian general election: Kannur
| Party | Candidate | Votes | % | ±% |
|---|---|---|---|---|
| INC | K. Sudhakaran | 518,524 | 48.74 | ▼2.00 |
| CPI(M) | M. V. Jayarajan | 4,09,542 | 38.50 | ▼3.18 |
| BJP | C. Raghunath | 1,19,876 | 11.27 | ▲4.71 |
| NOTA | None of the above | 8,873 | 0.83 | |
| Majority | | 1,08,982 | 10.24 | ▲1.18 |
| Turnout | | 10,66,171 | 78.22 | ▼5.06 |
| Registered electors | | 13,58,368 | | |
| INC hold | | Swing | ▼2.00 | |

By Assembly Segments
| No. | Status (Assembly Constituency) | Votes | | | Lead |
| No. | Status (Assembly Constituency) | K. Sudhakaran | M. V. Jayarajan | C. Raghunath | Lead |
|---|---|---|---|---|---|
| 8 | Taliparamba | 84,331 | 75,544 | 16,706 | 8,787 |
| 9 | Irikkur | 81,144 | 46,358 | 13,162 | 34,786 |
| 10 | Azhikode | 69,919 | 47,701 | 19,832 | 22,218 |
| 11 | Kannur | 69,824 | 43,794 | 16,975 | 26,030 |
| 12 | Dharmadam | 69,178 | 71,794 | 16,711 | 2,616 |
| 15 | Mattanur | 67,432 | 70,466 | 19,159 | 3,034 |
| 16 | Peravoor | 70,438 | 46,957 | 15,407 | 23,481 |

=== General Elections 2019 ===
2019 Indian general election: Kannur
| Party | Candidate | Votes | % | ±% |
|---|---|---|---|---|
| INC | K. Sudhakaran | 529,741 | 50.74 | 6.28 |
| CPI(M) | P. K. Sreemathy | 4,35,182 | 41.68 | −3.47 |
| BJP | C. K. Padmanabhan | 68,509 | 6.56 | 1.11 |
| SDPI | K. K. Abdul Jabbar | 8,142 | 0.78 | −1.24 |
| Independent | K. Sudhakaran S/o Krishnan | 2,249 | 0.21 | |
| SUCI(C) | R. Aparna | 2,162 | 0.21 | |
| Independent | P. K. Sudhakaran | 1,062 | 0.10 | |
| Independent | P. Sreemathi | 796 | 0.08 | |
| Independent | K. Sudhakaran S/o Kunhiraman | 726 | 0.07 | |
| Independent | K. Sreemathi | 581 | 0.06 | |
| Independent | Praveen Arimbrathodiyil | 318 | 0.03 | |
| Independent | Radhamani Narayanakumar | 286 | 0.03 | |
| Secular Democratic Congress | Kuriakose | 260 | 0.02 | |
| Margin of victory | | 94,559 | 9.06 | 8.36 |
| Turnout | | 10,44,124 | 83.28 | 1.51 |
| Registered electors | | 12,66,550 | | 8.23 |
| INC gain from CPI(M) | | Swing | 5.59 | |

By Assembly Segments
| No. | Status (Assembly Constituency) | Votes | | | Lead |
| No. | Status (Assembly Constituency) | K. Sudhakaran | P. K. Sreemathi | C. K. Padmanabhan | Lead |
|---|---|---|---|---|---|
| 8 | Taliparamba | 81,444 | 80,719 | 8,659 | 725 |
| 9 | Irikkur | 90,221 | 52,901 | 7,289 | 37,320 |
| 10 | Azhikode | 73,075 | 51,218 | 11,728 | 21,857 |
| 11 | Kannur | 70,683 | 47,260 | 9,740 | 23,423 |
| 12 | Dharmadam | 70,631 | 74,730 | 8,538 | 4,099 |
| 15 | Mattanur | 67,092 | 74,580 | 11,612 | 7,488 |
| 16 | Peravoor | 74,539 | 50,874 | 10,054 | 23,665 |

=== General Elections 2014 ===
2014 Indian general election: Kannur
| Party | Candidate | Votes | % | ±% |
|---|---|---|---|---|
| CPI(M) | P. K. Sreemathy | 427,622 | 45.15 | 0.03 |
| INC | K. Sudhakaran | 4,21,056 | 44.46 | −5.65 |
| BJP | P. C. Mohanan Master | 51,636 | 5.45 | 2.31 |
| SDPI | K. K. Abdul Jabbar | 19,170 | 2.02 | |
| NOTA | None of the Above | 7,026 | 0.74 | |
| AAP | Sasidharan K V | 6,106 | 0.64 | |
| Independent | K. Sudhakaran | 4,240 | 0.45 | |
| Margin of victory | | 6,566 | 0.69 | −4.30 |
| Turnout | | 9,47,117 | 81.06 | 0.18 |
| Registered electors | | 11,70,266 | | 9.40 |
| CPI(M) gain from INC | | Swing | -4.96 | |

By Assembly Segments
| No. | Status (Assembly Constituency) | Votes | | | Lead |
| No. | Status (Assembly Constituency) | P. K. Sreemathi | K. Sudhakaran | P. C. Mohanan | Lead |
|---|---|---|---|---|---|
| 8 | Taliparamba | 78,922 | 64,703 | 6,793 | 14,219 |
| 9 | Irikkur | 52,928 | 75,083 | 5,234 | 22,155 |
| 10 | Azhikode | 51,278 | 56,288 | 8,780 | 5,010 |
| 11 | Kannur | 47,116 | 55,173 | 6,829 | 8,057 |
| 12 | Dharmadam | 72,158 | 57,197 | 6,916 | 14,961 |
| 15 | Mattanur | 74,399 | 53,666 | 9,695 | 20,733 |
| 16 | Peravoor | 49,677 | 57,886 | 7,265 | 8,209 |

=== General Elections 2009 ===
After the 2008 delimitation, Taliparamba was added while Mananthavady was removed.

2009 Indian general election: Kannur
| Party | Candidate | Votes | % | ±% |
|---|---|---|---|---|
| INC | K. Sudhakaran | 432,878 | 50.11 | 9.32 |
| CPI(M) | K. K Ragesh | 3,89,727 | 45.12 | −5.41 |
| BJP | P. P Karunakaran Master | 27,123 | 3.14 | −2.34 |
| Margin of victory | | 43,151 | 5.00 | −4.74 |
| Turnout | | 8,63,832 | 80.84 | 1.68 |
| Registered electors | | 10,69,725 | | −1.76 |
| INC gain from CPI(M) | | Swing | -0.42 | |

=== General Elections 2004 ===
2004 Indian general election: Kannur
| Party | Candidate | Votes | % | ±% |
|---|---|---|---|---|
| CPI(M) | A. P. Abdullakutty | 435,058 | 50.53 | 1.86 |
| INC | Mullappally Ramachandran | 3,51,209 | 40.79 | −6.72 |
| BJP | O. K. Vasu Master | 47,213 | 5.48 | |
| Independent | Thomas Mannakuzhi | 10,295 | 1.20 | |
| Independent | Sreeraman Koyyon | 4,773 | 0.55 | |
| Independent | Satheesh Kumar Pamban | 4,274 | 0.50 | |
| Margin of victory | | 83,849 | 9.74 | 8.57 |
| Turnout | | 8,60,998 | 79.19 | 0.02 |
| Registered electors | | 10,88,892 | | −2.88 |
| CPI(M) hold | | Swing | 1.86 | |

By Assembly Segments (2004)

| No. | Constituency | Party | Lead |
|---|---|---|---|
| 6 | Irikkur | INC | 4,158 |
| 18 | Azhikode | CPI(M) | 19,204 |
| 19 | Kannur | INC | 1,542 |
| 32 | Edakkad | CPI(M) | 16,044 |
| 34 | Kuthuparamba | CPI(M) | 31,580 |
| 35 | Peravoor | CPI(M) | 13,522 |
| 36 | North Wynad | CPI(M) | 8,449 |

=== General Elections 1999 ===
1999 Indian general election: Kannur
| Party | Candidate | Votes | % | ±% |
|---|---|---|---|---|
| CPI(M) | A. P. Abdullakutty | 428,390 | 48.67 | |
| INC | Mullappally Ramachandran | 4,18,143 | 47.51 | 3.60 |
| JD(U) | N. Hariharan | 26,069 | 2.96 | |
| Margin of victory | | 10,247 | 1.16 | 0.91 |
| Turnout | | 8,80,180 | 79.05 | 5.00 |
| Registered electors | | 11,21,192 | | 4.61 |
| CPI(M) gain from INC | | Swing | -0.40 | |

By Assembly Segments (1999)

| No. | Constituency | Party | Lead |
|---|---|---|---|
| 6 | Irikkur | INC | 11,114 |
| 18 | Azhikode | CPI(M) | 17,614 |
| 19 | Kannur | INC | 15,110 |
| 32 | Edakkad | CPI(M) | 4,584 |
| 34 | Kuthuparamba | CPI(M) | 23,634 |
| 35 | Peravoor | INC | 2,700 |
| 36 | North Wynad | INC | 6,821 |

=== General Elections 1998 ===
1998 Indian general election: Kannur
| Party | Candidate | Votes | % | ±% |
|---|---|---|---|---|
| INC | Mullappally Ramachandran | 380,465 | 43.91 | −5.16 |
| Independent | A. C. Shanmukha Das | 3,78,285 | 43.66 | |
| BJP | P. C. Mohanan Master | 42,760 | 5.22 | 1.19 |
| INL | B. Hamza Haji | 10,016 | 1.22 | |
| Independent | Mullappali Chandran | 6,548 | 0.80 | |
| Margin of victory | | 2,180 | 0.25 | −4.93 |
| Turnout | | 8,66,525 | 76.90 | 2.84 |
| Registered electors | | 10,71,756 | | 2.44 |
| INC hold | | Swing | -5.16 | |

=== General Elections 1996 ===
1996 Indian general election: Kannur
| Party | Candidate | Votes | % | ±% |
|---|---|---|---|---|
| INC | Mullappally Ramachandran | 371,924 | 49.07 | −1.51 |
| IC(S) | Ramachandran Kadannappalli | 3,32,622 | 43.89 | |
| BJP | M. K. Saseeindran | 30,511 | 4.03 | 0.57 |
| Independent | Kolakkottu Ramachandran | 12,479 | 1.65 | |
| Independent | S. Mammu | 3,606 | 0.48 | |
| Margin of victory | | 39,302 | 5.19 | −0.34 |
| Turnout | | 7,57,933 | 74.06 | −3.37 |
| Registered electors | | 10,46,188 | | 8.03 |
| INC hold | | Swing | -1.51 | |

=== General Elections 1991 ===
1991 Indian general election: Kannur
| Party | Candidate | Votes | % | ±% |
|---|---|---|---|---|
| INC | Mullappally Ramachandran | 376,696 | 50.58 | 0.28 |
| CPI(M) | E. Ebranhim Kutty | 3,35,569 | 45.06 | 0.21 |
| BJP | M. K. Saseendran | 25,720 | 3.45 | −0.57 |
| Margin of victory | | 41,127 | 5.52 | 0.07 |
| Turnout | | 7,44,778 | 77.43 | −5.71 |
| Registered electors | | 9,68,420 | | 3.05 |
| INC hold | | Swing | 0.28 | |

=== General Elections 1989 ===
1989 Indian general election: Kannur
| Party | Candidate | Votes | % | ±% |
|---|---|---|---|---|
| INC | Mullappally Ramachandran | 391,042 | 50.30 | −1.36 |
| CPI(M) | P. Sasi | 3,48,638 | 44.85 | −2.33 |
| BJP | Palliyara Raman | 31,266 | 4.02 | |
| Margin of victory | | 42,404 | 5.45 | 0.97 |
| Turnout | | 7,77,420 | 83.14 | 1.20 |
| Registered electors | | 9,39,750 | | 35.59 |
| INC hold | | Swing | -1.36 | |

=== General Elections 1984 ===
1984 Indian general election: Kannur
| Party | Candidate | Votes | % | ±% |
|---|---|---|---|---|
| INC | Mullappally Ramachandran | 288,791 | 51.66 | |
| CPI(M) | Pattiam Rajan | 2,63,738 | 47.18 | |
| Independent | Kuntimangalam Azeez | 2,942 | 0.53 | |
| Margin of victory | | 25,053 | 4.48 | −11.91 |
| Turnout | | 5,59,056 | 81.94 | 11.42 |
| Registered electors | | 6,93,093 | | 8.64 |
| INC gain from INC(U) | | Swing | -6.04 | |

=== General Elections 1980 ===
1980 Indian general election: Kannur
| Party | Candidate | Votes | % | ±% |
|---|---|---|---|---|
| INC(U) | K. Kunhambu | 257,812 | 57.70 | |
| INC(I) | N. Ramakrishnan | 1,84,555 | 41.30 | |
| Independent | Koothan Narayanan | 4,477 | 1.00 | |
| Margin of victory | | 73,257 | 16.39 | 13.52 |
| Turnout | | 4,46,844 | 70.52 | −12.22 |
| Registered electors | | 6,37,975 | | 15.29 |
| INC(U) gain from CPI | | Swing | 7.32 | |

=== General Elections 1977 ===
1977 Indian general election: Kannur
| Party | Candidate | Votes | % | ±% |
|---|---|---|---|---|
| CPI | C. K. Chandrappan | 225,328 | 50.38 | −1.03 |
| CPI(M) | O. Bharathan | 2,12,451 | 47.50 | 6.10 |
| Independent | Father Vadakkan | 9,509 | 2.13 | |
| Margin of victory | | 12,877 | 2.88 | −7.13 |
| Turnout | | 4,47,288 | 82.74 | 11.63 |
| Registered electors | | 5,53,360 | | −1.70 |
| CPI hold | | Swing | -1.03 | |

=== General Elections 1971 ===
1971 Indian general election: Kannur
| Party | Candidate | Votes | % | ±% |
|---|---|---|---|---|
| CPI | C. K. Chandrappan | 204,483 | 51.41 | |
| CPI(M) | Pattiam Gopalan | 1,64,659 | 41.40 | −20.36 |
| INC(O) | N. Raghavan | 24,365 | 6.13 | |
| Independent | K. K. Kunhabdulla Haji | 4,236 | 1.07 | |
| Margin of victory | | 39,824 | 10.01 | −13.51 |
| Turnout | | 3,97,743 | 71.12 | −6.39 |
| Registered electors | | 5,62,923 | | 18.47 |
| CPI gain from CPI(M) | | Swing | -10.35 | |

=== General Elections 1967 ===
1967 Indian general election: Kannur
| Party | Candidate | Votes | % | ±% |
|---|---|---|---|---|
| CPI(M) | Pattiam Gopalan | 221,374 | 61.76 | |
| INC | T. M. Abdulla | 1,37,062 | 38.24 | −2.95 |
| Margin of victory | | 84,312 | 23.52 | 5.91 |
| Turnout | | 3,58,436 | 77.51 | 2.69 |
| Registered electors | | 4,75,141 | | −5.29 |
| CPI(M) gain from Independent | | Swing | 2.95 | |

=== General Elections 1962 ===
1962 Indian general election: Kannur
| Party | Candidate | Votes | % | ±% |
|---|---|---|---|---|
| Independent | S. K. Pottekkatt | 216,836 | 58.81 | |
| INC | K. T. Sukumaran | 1,51,886 | 41.19 | 4.04 |
| Margin of victory | | 64,950 | 17.61 | 17.15 |
| Turnout | | 3,68,722 | 74.82 | 11.58 |
| Registered electors | | 5,01,672 | | 7.05 |
| Independent gain from INC | | Swing | 21.66 | |

=== General Elections 1957 ===
1957 Indian general election: Kannur
| Party | Candidate | Votes | % | ±% |
|---|---|---|---|---|
| INC | M. K. Jinachandran | 110,114 | 37.15 | |
| Independent | S. K. Pottekkatt | 1,08,732 | 36.68 | |
| PSP | Padmaprabhaundan | 77,548 | 26.16 | |
| Margin of victory | | 1,382 | 0.47 | |
| Turnout | | 2,96,394 | 63.25 | |
| Registered electors | | 4,68,639 | | |
| INC win (new seat) | | | | |

== See also ==
- Kannur district
- List of constituencies of the Lok Sabha
- 2024 Indian general election in Kerala
