= T. K. Govindan Master =

Indian politician

T. K. Govindan

Member of the Kerala Legislative Assembly
- Incumbent
- Assumed office May 2026
- Preceded by: M. V. Govindan
- Constituency: Taliparamba

Personal details
- Born: 1951 (age 74–75) Malapattam, Kannur district, Kerala, India
- Party: Independent
- Parent: Kunhikkannan Nambiar (father)
- Occupation: Teacher, Politician

T. K. Govindan is an Indian politician and former educator currently serving as the member of the legislative assembly (MLA) representing the Taliparamba constituency in the Kerala Legislative Assembly. He was elected in the 2026 Kerala Legislative Assembly election as an independent candidate supported by the United Democratic Front (UDF).

== Political career ==
Prior to entering active politics, Govindan Master was a prominent teacher in the Kannur district, which earned him the honorific "Master." In the 2026 Kerala Assembly elections, he contested as an independent candidate after departing from the CPI(M) following internal disagreements.

In a significant political upset, he defeated P. K. Shyamala Teacher (the spouse of CPI(M) State Secretary M. V. Govindan) by a margin of 12,551 votes. The victory was notable as Taliparamba has historically been a stronghold for the Left Democratic Front (LDF) since 1977.

== Election results ==
=== 2026 Kerala Legislative Assembly election ===
The election was held in May 2026. After 20 rounds of counting, T. K. Govindan Master was declared the winner.

| Party | Candidate | Votes | % | ±% | |
|---|---|---|---|---|---|
| | Independent (UDF) | T. K. Govindan | 91,339 | 48.01 | +12.55 |
| | CPI(M) (LDF) | P. K. Shyamala Teacher | 78,788 | 41.41 | -12.51 |
| | BJP (NDA) | N. Haridas | 16,089 | 8.46 | -0.32 |
| | AAP | Anappalli Gopalan | 1,083 | 0.57 | New |
| | Independent | Koyyam Janardhanan | 1,202 | 0.63 | N/A |
| | Independent | T. K. Govindan (S/O Kunhiraman) | 735 | 0.39 | N/A |
| NOTA | | 1,798 | 0.94 | +0.12 | |
| Margin of victory | | 12,551 | 6.60 | | |
| Total valid votes | | 1,90,244 | | | |
| Independent gain from CPI(M) | | Swing | +12.53 | | |
