= Kerala Institute of Local Administration =

Autonomous government institution in Kerala

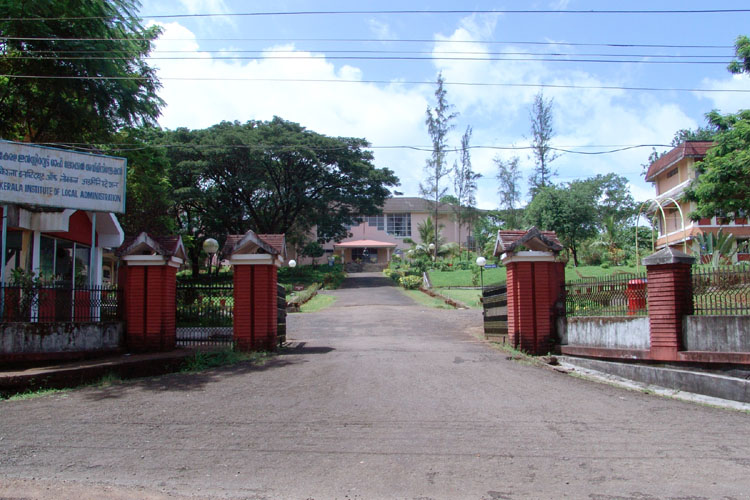

Agency overview
- Formed: 1990; 36 years ago
- Jurisdiction: Government of Kerala
- Headquarters: Thrissur
- Agency executive: Dr. Nizamuddeen A.
- Parent agency: Local Self Government Department, Government of Kerala
- Website: kila.ac.in

Kerala Institute of Local Administration (KILA) is an autonomous training and research institution of the Government of Kerala that focuses on decentralised governance and capacity-building for local self government department in the state. KILA has its head office located in Thrissur. KILA is the first civil service training institution in Kerala to receive accreditation from the Capacity Building Commission (CBC). Additionally, this institution is also the first university for local self governance in India.

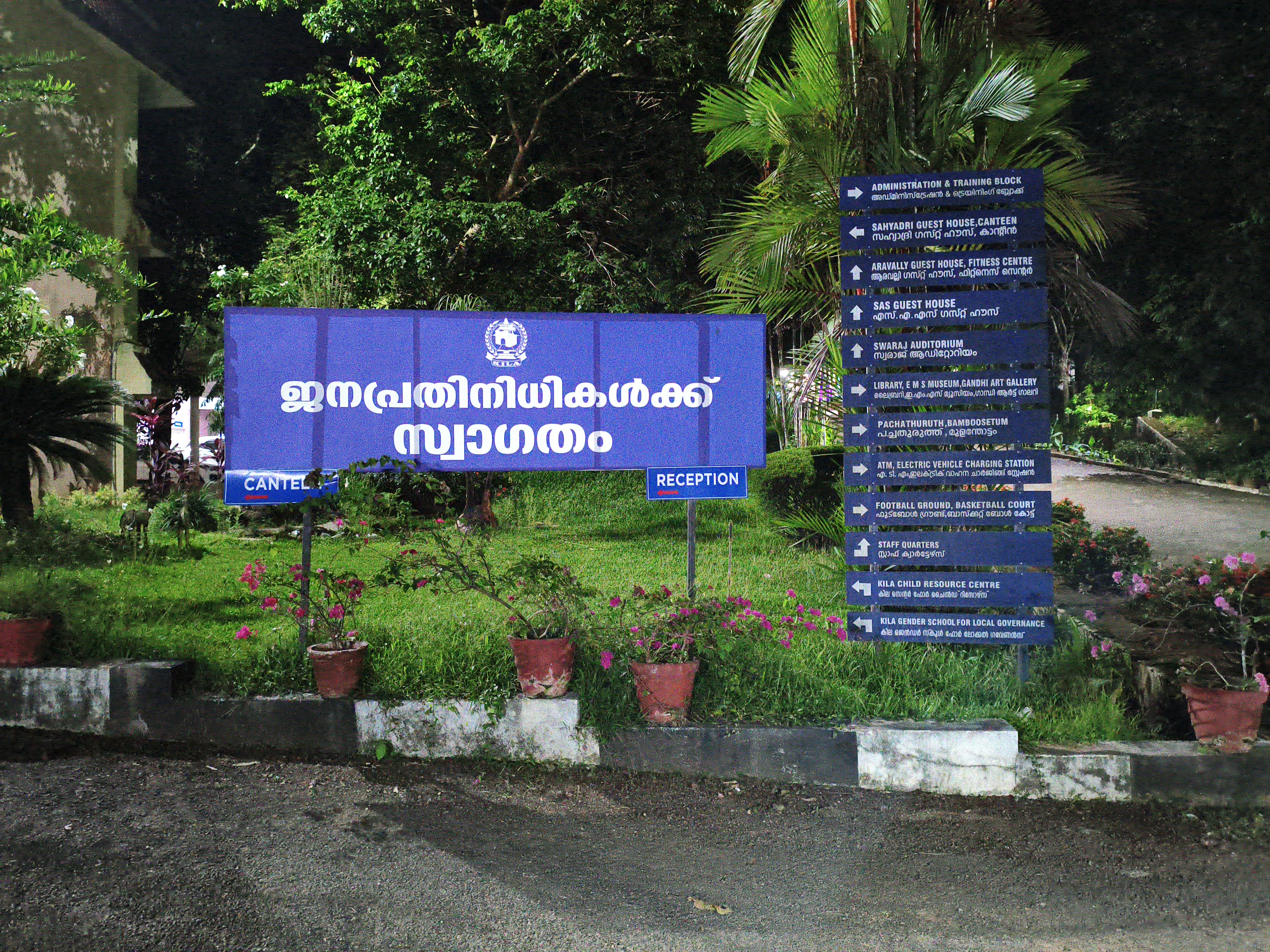
Welcome Board at KILA Main Campus

== History ==
KILA was established in 1990 under the Travancore-Cochin Literary, Scientific and Charitable Societies Registration Act, 1955, to support the implementation of the 73rd and 74th Constitutional Amendments in Kerala.

=== Partnership with UNU-CRIS ===
Kerala Institute of Local Administration entered into a strategic partnership with the UNU-CRIS, the United Nations (UN) University’s research arm based in the city of Brussels. The two institutions signed a Letter of Intent (LoI) in September 2025 to enhance cooperation in research, policy support, capacity building, and experiential learning for local governance.

As per the LoI, the collaboration covers joint research projects, policy formulation, training programmes, student exchanges, joint publications, and knowledge-sharing initiatives. The partnership aims to enable world-class studies in urban development, decentralised governance, and sustainable development goals (SDGs), while equipping officials with adequate training and fostering innovative policy frameworks to achieve the same.

The initiative is expected to strengthen the efficiency and quality of local governments in Kerala by bringing global expertise and practices to the state. Officials said the collaboration could usher in a new era for higher education in Kerala by opening international learning and research opportunities for students.

The LoI was signed by UNU-CRIS director Philippe De Lombaerde and KILA director general A. Nizamudeen. The signing ceremony was held during the Kerala Urban Conclave.

== Activities ==
KILA has developed a new methodology to help local governments in Kerala prepare local action plans for climate change (LAPCCs), strengthening climate-responsive planning at the panchayat and urban local body level. This methodology was designed to guide local self-government institutions in systematically assessing climate risks and identifying location-specific adaptation and mitigation actions. KILA also launched a dedicated initiative to groom prospective women leaders ahead of the 2025 Kerala local elections, aiming to strengthen women’s representation and effectiveness in local self-government institutions.

== Key initiatives ==
- Rebuild Kerala Initiative: Supported recruitment of disaster management coordinators in 2020.
- Extreme poverty eradication training: Provided training to officials of LSG in order to assist eradicate extreme poverty.

== Governance ==
KILA is governed by a governing body chaired by the Minister for Local Self Governments. The director general is A. Nizamuddin.

Governing Council

Constituent	Role
Minister for Local Self Governments (Incumbent: K.M. Shaji)	Chairperson
Chief Secretary to Government	Vice Chairperson
Secretary to Government, LSGD	Convener
Secretary to Government, Finance Department	Member
Commissioner for Rural Development	Member
Director, Local Self Government (Rural)	Member
Director, Local Self Government (Urban)	Member
Secretary to Government, Planning and Economic Affairs Department	Member
Representative from Ministry of Rural Development, Government of India	Member
Representative from Ministry of Panchayati Raj, Government of India	Member
Director General, Kerala Institute of Local Administration (KILA)	Member
Representative from National Institute of Rural Development and Panchayati Raj (NIRDPR)	Member
President, Kerala Grama Panchayat Association	Member
President, Block Panchayat Association	Member
Chairman, Chamber of Municipal Chairpersons	Member
Member of Parliament	Member
Member of Legislative Assembly	Member
President, District Panchayat Presidents Chamber	Member
President, Mayors Council	Member

== Awards and recognitions ==
KILA was awarded the Panchayat Kshamta Nirman Sarvottam Sansthan Puraskar (PKNSSP) for capacity-building of local bodies by the Ministry of Panchayati Raj for its systematic training and support to panchayats and other local governments in 2024 and 2025.

In addition to that, KILA was also awarded the Desiya Panchayat Kshamatha Nirman Sarvotham Sansthan Award (Best Institution Category) for the year 2023–2024 by the Ministry of Panchayati Raj. This recognition highlights KILA's efforts in enhancing the efficiency and skills of local self-government institutions (LSGIs) through innovative and sustainable interventions. The award celebrates institutions across the country that have shown excellence in training and capacity building of the LSGIs. KILA had secured the top position in the category in the previous year as well.

== See also ==
- Panchayati raj
- Local government in Kerala
- Sustainable Development Goals
