= K. K. N. Pariyaram =

Indian freedom fighter and politician

K. K.N. Pariyaram

Member of the Kerala Legislative Assembly
- In office 1987 – 24 February 1989

Personal details
- Born: November 30, 1916 Chembilodu, Malabar District, British India
- Died: February 24, 1989 (aged 72)
- Party: Communist Party of India (Marxist)

K. Krishnan Nambiar Pariyaram was a Member of the Kerala Legislative Assembly from Kerala, India. He represented Taliparamba Assembly constituency in 8th Kerala Legislative Assembly as a CPI(M) candidate.

== Biography ==
K. K. N. Pariyaram was born on November 30, 1916, the son of Krishnan Nambiar at Choyote in Chembilode Panchayath in present-day Kannur district. He joined Naricode School in 1938 as a teacher. He became active in politics by organizing peasants against the landlord of the school grounds. He entered politics as a member of Indian National Congress and actively participated in Indian freedom movement. He left congress and joined the Communist Party of India in 1940.

In 1940, he went into hiding following the Morazha incident. He was arrested in November 1940 and punished imprisonment for four years. Although he went into hiding again in 1948, he was arrested by the police while participating in a public meeting on the occasion of Kayyur Day. After serving six months in prison, he remained in hiding until 1950. He was arrested in 1965 on charges of spying for China and in 1975 during the emergency.

After split of the Communist Party of Indiain 1964, he remained with Communist Party of India (Marxist). He represented Taliparamba constituency in 8th Kerala Legislative Assembly as a CPI(M) candidate. He died on 24 February 1989, while a member of the Legislative Assembly.

He has also served as a member of the CPI (M) Kannur District Committee, a member of the Karshaka Sangham, President of the Pariyaram Panchayat, and head of organizations such as Confed and Raidco.

== Legacy ==
The KKN Pariyaram Memorial Government Vocational Higher Secondary School in Thaliparamba is named after him.
