= Parassini Kunhiraman Nair =

Indian Kathakali exponent (1933-2018)

- Born: K. Kunhiraman Nair; 3 May 1933; Kayaralam, Madras Presidency, British Raj
- Died: 13 November 2018 (aged 85); Kolmotta, Anthoor, Kannur district, Kerala, India
- Occupation: Kathakali exponent
- Spouse: Memadamthil Lakshmi
- Children: 5
- Awards: Sangeet Natak Akademi Award (2015)

K. Kunhiraman Nair, popularly known as Parassini Kunhiraman Nair (May 3, 1933 - November 13, 2018) was an Indian Kathakali performer and teacher from Kerala. He received the Sangeet Natak Akademi Award for the year 2015.

== Biography ==
K. Kunhiraman Nair was born on 3 May 1933 in Kayaralam in the present-day Kannur district of Kerala. Born into a modest family, Kunhiraman Nair lost his schoolteacher father when he was just two months old. When his mother Kalyani remarried, she moved into her husband's house with him. His step-father was running a tea-shop near the Parassini Madappura temple. The owner family of the temple has also owned a Kathakali troupe. Faced with extreme financial hardship, he discontinued formal schooling after the fourth standard.

When the Kathakali troupe of Madappura temple family needed trainees in Kathakali, his family enrolled him there. He started his Kathakali studies there in traditional gurukula regime under guru Kadathanattu Kochugovindan Nair. After 6 months training he made his stage debut as Krishna in Narakasuravadham Kathakali. He trained under Kochugovindan Nair for seven years before receiving advanced training under Kadathanattu Sankaran Nair and Kadathanattu Ravunni Nair.

Kunhiraman Nair and his wife Memadamthil Lakshmi had five children, Ramachandran, Shailaja, Shaima, Sheeja and Rajesh. He died on November 13, 2018, at his residence in Kolmotta, Kannur district.

== Career and contributions ==
Kunhiraman Nair is a follower of Kadathanadan style of Kathakali. After training he became the lead artist in Parassinikkadavu Muthappan Kathakali Yogam. He played many Kathi and Vellathadi roles including Hanuman, Keechakan, Narakasuran, Raudra Bheeman and Ravanan. He has performed extensively at varioustemples in Kerala, and also in other venues across the country.

Nair, who has taught Kathakali to many, was a teacher in the Taliparamba Kathakali Sangham for a long time.

== Awards and honours ==
For his contributions in the field of Kathakali, Nair received the Sangeet Natak Akademi Award for the year 2015.
