= P. K. Sreemathy =

Indian politician

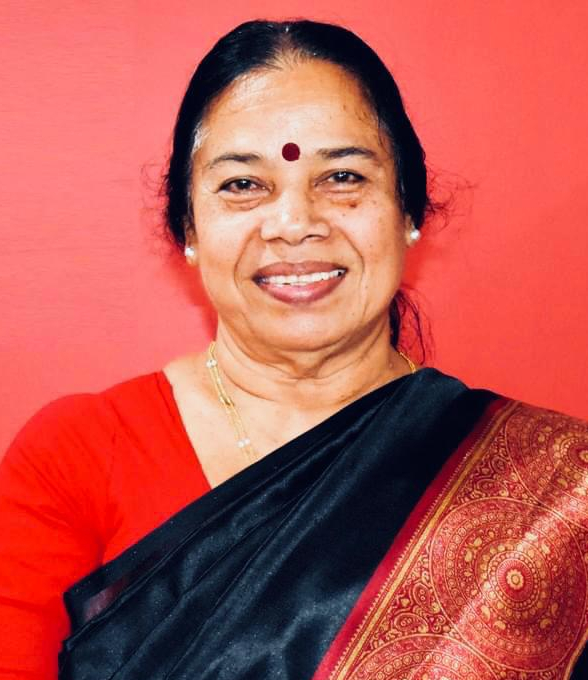

Member of Parliament, Lok Sabha
- In office 5 June 2014 – 17 June 2019
- Preceded by: K. Sudhakaran
- Succeeded by: K. Sudhakaran
- Constituency: Kannur

Minister for Health and Family Welfare, Government of Kerala
- In office 18 May 2006 – 16 May 2011
- Chief Minister: V. S. Achuthanandan
- Preceded by: K. K. Ramachandran Master
- Succeeded by: Adoor Prakash

Member of Kerala Legislative Assembly
- In office 2001 – 2011
- Preceded by: Pinarayi Vijayan
- Succeeded by: C. Krishnan
- Constituency: Payyanur

Personal details
- Born: 4 May 1949 (age 76) Mayyil, Malabar District, Madras State, Dominion of India (present day Kannur, Kerala, India)
- Party: Communist Party of India (Marxist)

P. K. Sreemathy (born 4 May 1949), popularly known as P. K. Sreemathy Teacher, is an Indian politician and a member of the CPI(M). Born at Mayyil Panchayat in Kannur district, Sreemathy was elected to the Kerala Legislative Assembly in 2001 and 2006 from Payyanur Assembly constituency. She was the Health and Family Welfare Minister of Kerala from 2006 to 2011. She was MP of 16th Lok Sabha, representing Kannur Lok Sabha constituency.

== Biography ==
Sreemathy teacher is a politician in Kerala politics. She was born on 4 May 1949 as the daughter of Kelu Nambiar and P. K. Meenakshi Amma. She retired from service in 2003 while she was the head teacher at Neruvambram Upper Primary School.

She was the Kannur District Council standing committee chairperson for some time before she became the Kannur district Panchayat from 1995 to 1997. Now she is AIDWA State secretary and CPI(M) National Committee Member. She was elected to the Kerala Legislative Assembly in 2001 and 2006 from Payyanur Assembly constituency. She won the 2014 Lok Sabha election from Kannur Lok Sabha constituency, defeating K. Sudhakaran by a margin of 6566 votes. She lost to K. Sudhakaran with a margin of 94,559 votes in the 2019 Indian General election.

== Positions held ==
- Standing Committee Chairman, Kannur District Panchayat.
- President, Kannur District Panchayat.
- State Secretary, AIDWA
- CPI (M), National Committee Member.
- Minister for Health and Family Welfare, Government of Kerala, Achuthanandan ministry
- MP from Kannur Lok Sabha constituency
- Member, Committee on Empowerment of Women
- Retired Head Teacher
- Member, Standing Committee on Human Resource Development
- Member, Consultative Committee, Ministry of Health and Family Welfare
- Member, Silk Board

== See also ==
- Kerala Council of Ministers
