= Taliparamba Assembly constituency =

Constituency of the Kerala legislative assembly in India

Taliparamba
- Constituency No. 8 for the Kerala Legislative Assembly
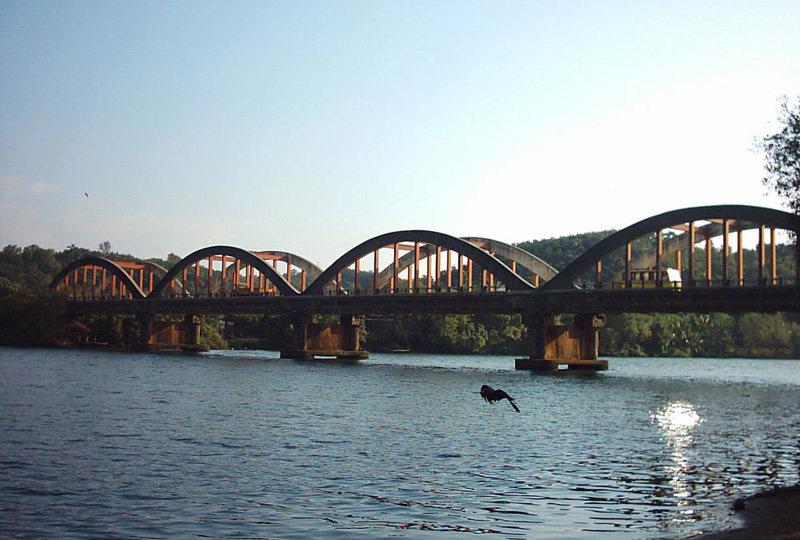
- Kuppam bridge is located at Taliparamba

Constituency details
- Country: India
- Region: South India
- State: Kerala
- District: Kannur
- Established: 1965
- Total electors: 232,280 (2026)
- Reservation: None

Member of Legislative Assembly
- 16th Kerala Legislative Assembly
- Incumbent T. K. Govindan
- Party: Independent Politician
- Alliance: UDF
- Elected year: 2026

Taliparamba State assembly constituency is one of the 140 state legislative assembly constituencies in Kerala in India. It is also one of the seven state legislative assembly constituencies included in Kannur Lok Sabha constituency. As of the 2026 Assembly elections, the current MLA is T.K. Govindan, an independent candidate contested for UDF party.

== Local self-governed segments ==
Taliparamba Assembly constituency is composed of the following local self-governed segments:

Sl no.	Name	Status (Grama panchayat/Municipality)	Taluk
1	Anthoor	Municipality	Taliparamba
2	Taliparamba	Municipality	Taliparamba
3	Chapparapadavu	Grama panchayat	Taliparamba
4	Kolachery	Grama panchayat	Taliparamba
5	Kurumathur	Grama panchayat	Taliparamba
6	Kuttiattoor	Grama panchayat	Taliparamba
7	Malapattam	Grama panchayat	Taliparamba
8	Mayyil	Grama panchayat	Taliparamba
9	Pariyaram	Grama panchayat	Taliparamba

== Members of the Legislative Assembly ==
The following list contains all members of Kerala Legislative Assembly who have represented the constituency:

Election	Niyama Sabha	Name	Party	Tenure
1967	3rd	K. P. R. Poduval	Communist Party of India (Marxist)	1967 – 1970
1970	4th	C. P. Govindan Nambiar	Indian National Congress	1970 – 1977
1977	5th	M. V. Raghavan	Communist Party of India (Marxist)	1977 – 1980
1980	6th	C. P. Moosankutty	Communist Party of India (Marxist)	1980 – 1982
1982	7th	C. P. Moosankutty	Communist Party of India (Marxist)	1982 – 1987
1987	8th	K. K. N. Pariyaram	Communist Party of India (Marxist)	1987 – 1991
1991	9th	Pacheni Kunhiraman	Communist Party of India (Marxist)	1991 – 1996
1996	10th	M. V. Govindan	Communist Party of India (Marxist)	1996 – 2001
2001	11th	M. V. Govindan	Communist Party of India (Marxist)	2001 – 2006
2006	12th	C. K. P. Padmanabhan	Communist Party of India (Marxist)	2006 – 2011
2011	13th	James Mathew	Communist Party of India (Marxist)	2011 – 2016
2016	14th	James Mathew	Communist Party of India (Marxist)	2016-2021
2021	15th	M. V. Govindan	Communist Party of India (Marxist)	2021-2026
2026	16th	T. K. Govindan	United Democratic Front	2026 – present

== Election results ==
=== 2026 ===
There were 232,280 registered voters in the Taliparamba constituency for the 2026 Kerala Assembly election.

2026 Kerala Legislative Assembly election: Taliparamba
Party	Candidate	Votes	%	±%
UDF	T. K. Govindan	91,339	47.53	▲8.13
CPI(M)	P. K. Shyamala	78,778	41.00	▼11.14
BJP	N. Haridas	16,089	8.37	▲1.04
Independent	Koyyam Janardhanan	1,202	0.63	
AAP	Anappalli Gopalan	1,083	0.56	
Independent	T. K. Govindan	735	0.38	
Independent	Abdul Salam K. P.	366	0.19	
Independent	Shyamala P.	294	0.15	
Independent	Khamarudheen C. V.	283	0.15	
Independent	C. Balakrishnan Yadav	198	0.10	▼0.01
NOTA	None of the above	1,789	0.94	▲0.50
Margin of victory		12,551	6.53	▼4.21
Turnout		1,92,156	82.00	▲1.58
UDF gain from CPI(M)		Swing	▲8.13	

Local Body	Booths	UDF-backed IND Votes	LDF Votes	NDA/BJP Votes	Leader	Lead
Pariyaram	30	12,091	10,306	1,653	UDF-backed IND	1,785
Chapparappadavu	28	11,940	7,625	1,726	UDF-backed IND	4,315
Kurumathur	36	14,223	10,816	2,711	UDF-backed IND	3,407
Taliparamba Municipality	29	15,935	5,977	2,097	UDF-backed IND	9,958
Anthoor Municipality	27	5,227	14,554	2,407	LDF	9,327
Mayyil	29	9,570	9,139	1,587	UDF-backed IND	431
Kolachery	22	10,593	5,673	1,573	UDF-backed IND	4,920
Kuttiattoor	26	8,463	9,956	1,802	LDF	1,493
Malapattam	6	1,878	2,644	218	LDF	766
TOTAL	233	89,920	76,690	15,774	UDF-backed IND	13,230

=== 2021 ===
There were 2,13,096 registered voters in the constituency for the 2021 election.

2021 Kerala Legislative Assembly election: Taliparamba
Party	Candidate	Votes	%	±%
CPI(M)	M. V. Govindan	92,870	52.14	▼4.81
INC	V. P. Abdul Rasheed	70,181	39.40	▲7.84
BJP	A. P. Gangadharan	13,058	7.33	▼1.88
NOTA	None of the above	789	0.44	−
Independent	K. O. P. Shijith	508	0.29	−
Independent	Abdul Rasheed s/o Ismail	365	0.20	−
Independent	C. Balakrishnan Yadav	191	0.11	−
Independent	Govindan Karayapath	150	0.08	−
Margin of victory		22,689	10.74	▼14.65
Turnout		1,78,112	83.58	▲2.61
CPI(M) hold		Swing	▼4.81	

=== 2016 ===
There were 1,97,568 registered voters in the constituency for the 2016 election.

2016 Kerala Legislative Assembly election: Taliparamba
Party	Candidate	Votes	%	±%
CPI(M)	James Mathew	91,106	56.95	▲0.82
KC(M)	Rajesh Nambiar	50,489	31.56	▼5.27
BJP	P. Balakrishnan	14,742	9.21	▲4.71
SDPI	Ibrahim Thiruvatoor	1,323	0.83	▼0.51
NOTA	None of the above	867	0.54	−
BSP	P. K .Ayyappan	675	0.42	▼0.22
Independent	K. Sadanandan	288	0.18	−
Independent	K. Rajesh Kumar	287	0.18	−
Independent	P. V. Anil	203	0.13	−
Margin of victory		40,617	25.39	▲6.09
Turnout		1,59,980	80.97	▼1.62
CPI(M) hold		Swing	▲0.82	

=== 2011 ===
There were 1,74,788 registered voters in the constituency for the 2011 election.

2011 Kerala Legislative Assembly election: Taliparamba
Party	Candidate	Votes	%	±%
CPI(M)	James Mathew	81,031	56.13	
KC(M)	Job Michael	53,170	36.83	
BJP	K. Jayaprakash	6,492	4.50	
SDPI	Muhammadali S. P.	1,930	1.34	
BSP	Nidheesh Thillankeri	927	0.64	
Independent	Thomas M. V.	813	0.56	
Margin of victory		27,861	19.30	
Turnout		1,44,363	82.59	
CPI(M) hold		Swing		

=== 1952 ===
1952 Madras Legislative Assembly election: Thaliparamba
Party	Candidate	Votes	%	±%
CPI	T. C. Narayanan Nambiar	31,988	64.82%	
INC	V. V. Damodaran Nayanar	13,658	27.67%	
Independent	N. Abuchengalan	2,002	4.06%	
Independent	K. V. George	1,704	3.45%	
Margin of victory		18,330	37.14%	
Turnout		49,352	67.24%	
Registered electors		73,401		
CPI win (new seat)				

== See also ==
- Taliparamba
- Kannur district
- List of constituencies of the Kerala Legislative Assembly
- 2016 Kerala Legislative Assembly election
