= K. Sudhakaran =

Indian politician (born 1948)

Kumbakudi Sudhakaran

President, Kerala Pradesh Congress Committee
- In office 16 June 2021 – 8 May 2025
- Preceded by: Mullappally Ramachandran
- Succeeded by: Sunny Joseph

Member of Parliament, Lok Sabha
- Incumbent
- Assumed office 23 May 2019
- Preceded by: P. K. Sreemathy
- Constituency: Kannur
- In office 16 May 2009 – 16 May 2014
- Preceded by: A. P. Abdullakutty
- Succeeded by: P. K. Sreemathy
- Constituency: Kannur

Member of the Kerala Legislative Assembly
- In office 10 May 1996 – 16 May 2009
- Preceded by: N. Ramakrishnan
- Succeeded by: A. P. Abdullakutty
- Constituency: Kannur

Minister for Forest, Government of Kerala
- In office 17 May 2001 – 29 August 2004
- Preceded by: C. K. Nanu
- Succeeded by: K. P. Viswanathan

Personal details
- Born: 7 June 1948 (age 78) Malabar District, Madras State, India (present day Kannur, Kerala, India)
- Party: Indian National Congress
- Spouse: K. Smitha
- Children: 2
- Parents: V. Ramunni, Madhavi
- Education: Master of Arts; Bachelor of Laws
- Alma mater: Government Brennen College, Thalassery
- Occupation: Politician

Kumbakudi Sudhakaran (born 7 June 1948) is an Indian politician and former president of the Kerala Pradesh Congress Committee (KPCC). He was also the former Cabinet Minister in the Government of Kerala. He is currently serving as Member of Parliament (MP), Lok Sabha, from Kannur, Kerala and member of Parliamentary Standing Committees on Rural Development and Welfare of OBCs. He represents the Indian National Congress. He has also served as a four-term member in the Kerala Legislative Assembly and represented the Kannur constituency from 1996 to 2009. He was elected as MP of Kannur constituency in the 2019 and 2024 Indian general elections.

== Personal life ==
K. Sudhakaran was born on 7 June 1948 in a small village called Nadal Thiyya family in Kannur district. Shri V. Ramunni and Smt. K. Madhavi are his parents. He completed M.A., LL.B. and also graduated in B.A. in History from Government Brennen College, Thalassery.

== Political timeline ==
- 2024 : Elected to 18th Lok Sabha from Kannur where he defeated M. V. Jayarajan of CPIM by a margin of 1,08,982 votes.
- 2019 : Elected to 17th Lok Sabha from Kannur where he defeated P.K.Sreemathy of CPIM by a margin of 94,559 votes.
- 2009 : Elected to 15th Lok Sabha from Kannur where he defeated K. K. Rajesh of CPIM by a margin of 43151 votes.
- 2009 : Member, Committee on Public Accounts and Member, Committee on Commerce.
- 2001-2004 : Minister of Forest and Wildlife, Government of Kerala.
- 2001 : Minister, Forest, and Sports, Govt. of Kerala.
- 1992 : Member, Kerala Legislative Assembly, 1992–2009 in Kannur constituency.
- 1991: Contested from Edakkad constituency as an Indian National Congress candidate and lost to O. Bharathan of CPI(M) for a margin of 219 votes
- 1982: Contested from Edakkad constituency as an independent candidate and lost to A. K. Saseendran of Indian Congress (Socialist) for a margin of 7,543 votes.
- 1980: Contested from Edakkad constituency as the candidate of Janata Party and lost to P. P. V. Moosa of All India Muslim League for a margin of 9,957 votes.

=== Electoral performance in Kerala Assembly ===
Year	Constituency	Party	Opponent	Result	Margin
1980	Edakkad	Janata Party	P. P. V. Moosa (AIML)	Lost	9,957
1982	Edakkad	Independent	A. K. Saseendran (IC(S))	Lost	7,543
1991	Edakkad	INC	O. Bharathan (CPI(M))	Lost	219
2001	Kannur	INC	Kasim Irikkur (Independent)	Won	19,133
2016	Udma	INC	K. Kunhiraman (CPI(M))	Lost	3,832

== Controversies ==
He was arrested by the Kerala Police as part of the investigation in a cheating case regarding a fake antique handler Monson Mavunkal and was released as per the interim bail order of the Kerala High Court in June 2023 .
