= South Bazar (Caltex Junction) =

- Junction
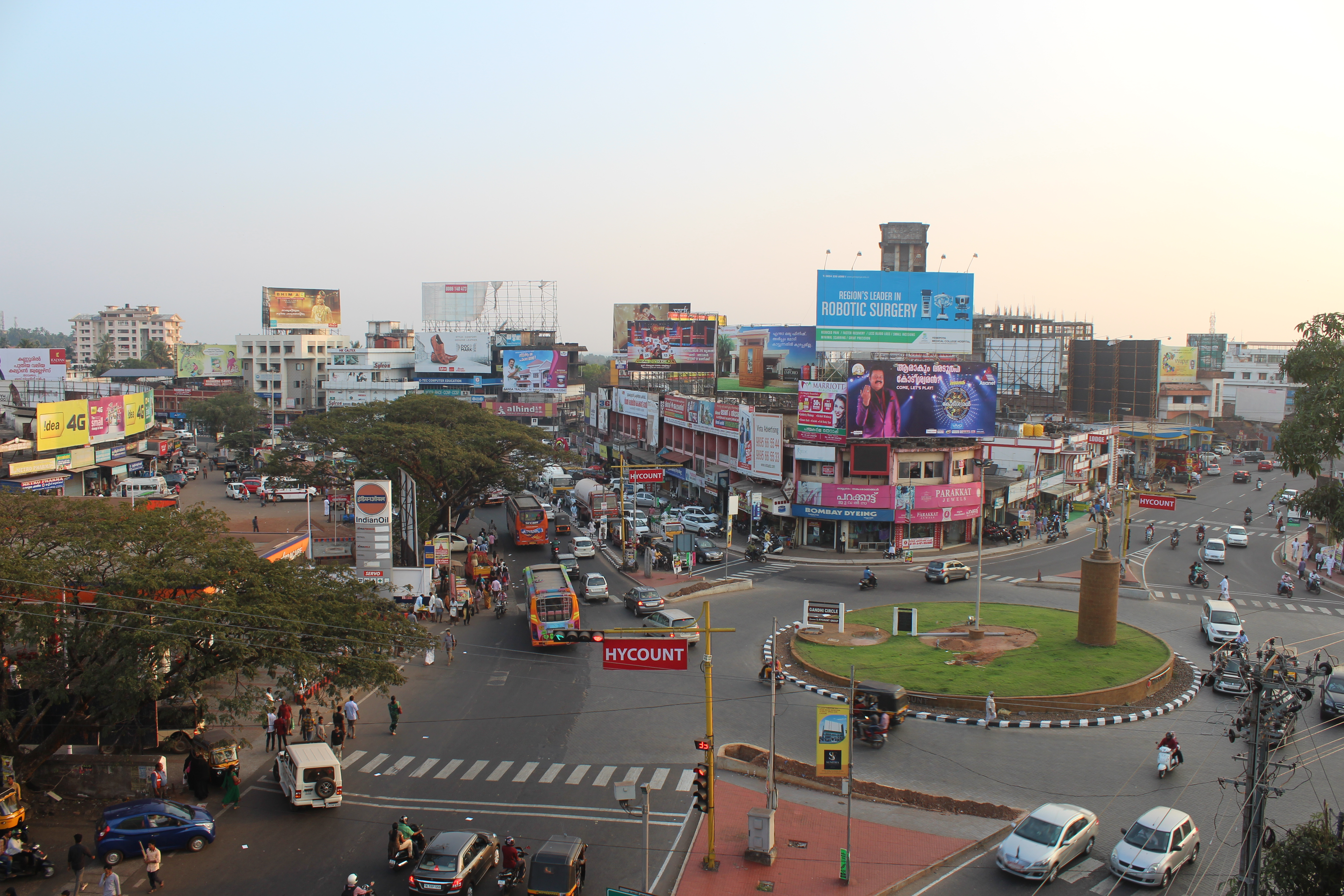
- Caltex Junction, Kannur
- Interactive map of South Bazar
- Coordinates: 11.8785°N 75.3737°E
- Country: India
- State: Kerala
- District: Kannur

Government
  - Body: Kannur Municipal Corporation

Languages
  - Official: Malayalam, English
- Time zone: UTC+5:30 (IST)
- Postal code: 670001
- ISO 3166 code: IN-KL
- Vehicle registration: KL-13

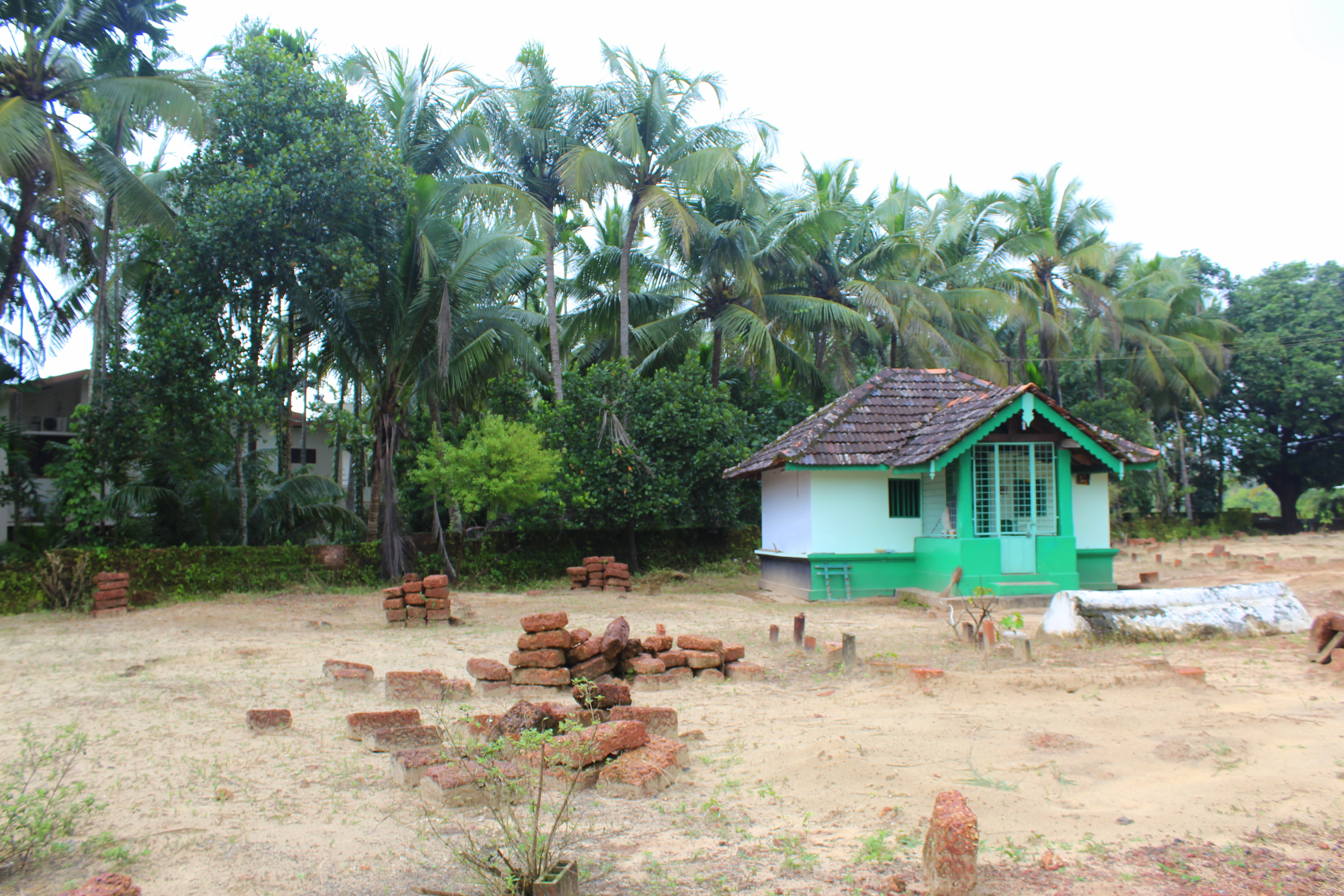
South Bazar Dargah

South Bazar or South Bazaar (Malayalam: Thekki Bazar) is a market area and road junction in Kannur city, Kerala, India. It is located on National Highway 66 between Kannur and Taliparamba.

Caltex Junction is a major junction in the area, where National Highway 66 meets Collectorate Road and Stadium Road. The junction is close to government offices including the Kannur taluk office. The KSRTC bus depot, Kannur, is located at this junction.

The area has several grocery stores and automobile showrooms. A branch of the Indian Coffee House is also located in South Bazar.

== Future Development ==
South Bazar (Caltex Junction) being one of the busiest junction in the Kannur city, so a new flyover has been proposed over the junction to ease the traffic congestion.

== Satellite image ==
- Satellite image of South Bazar

== See also ==
- Kannur
- Kannur District
- Taliparamba

== Image gallery ==
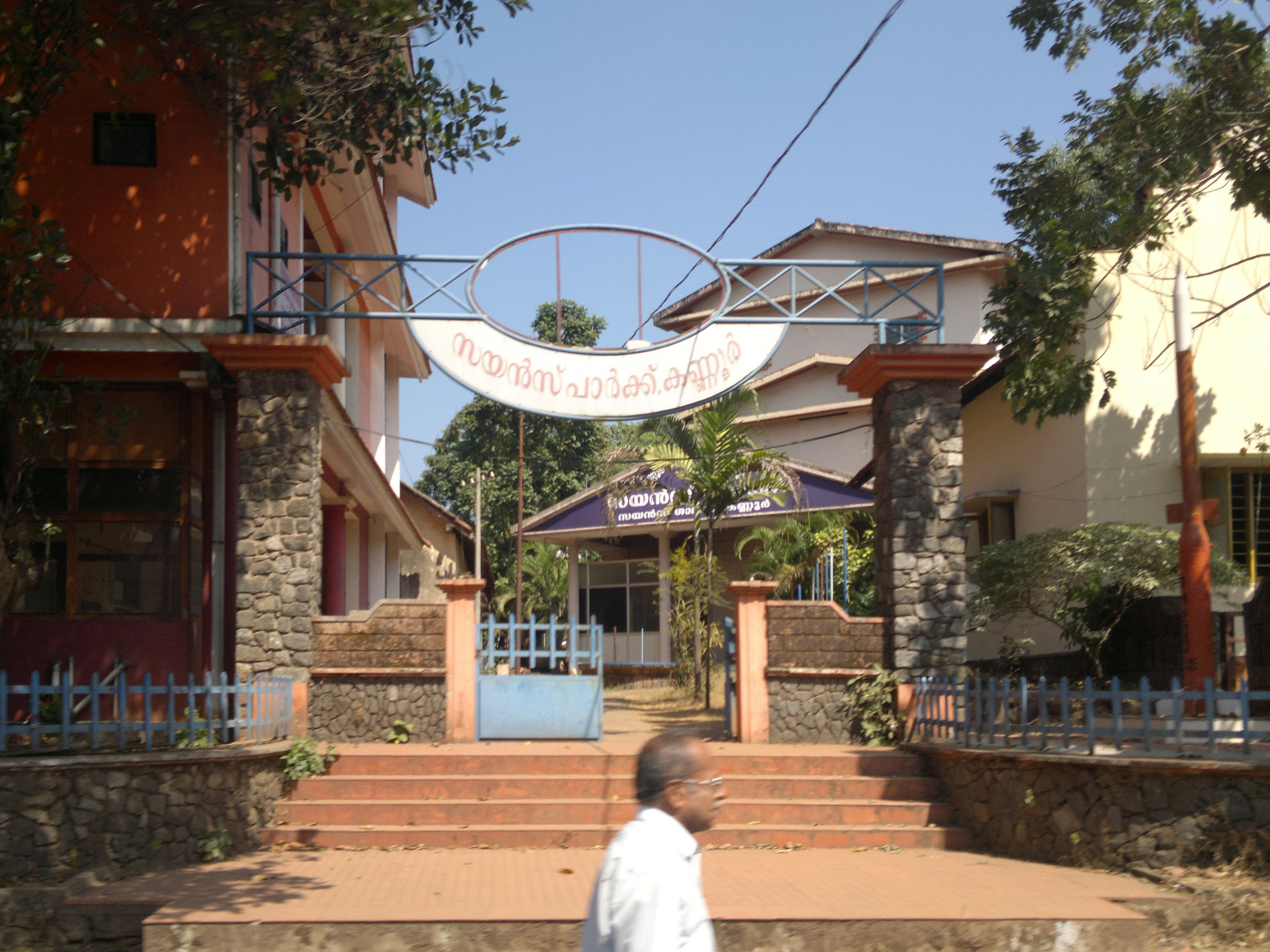
Science Park

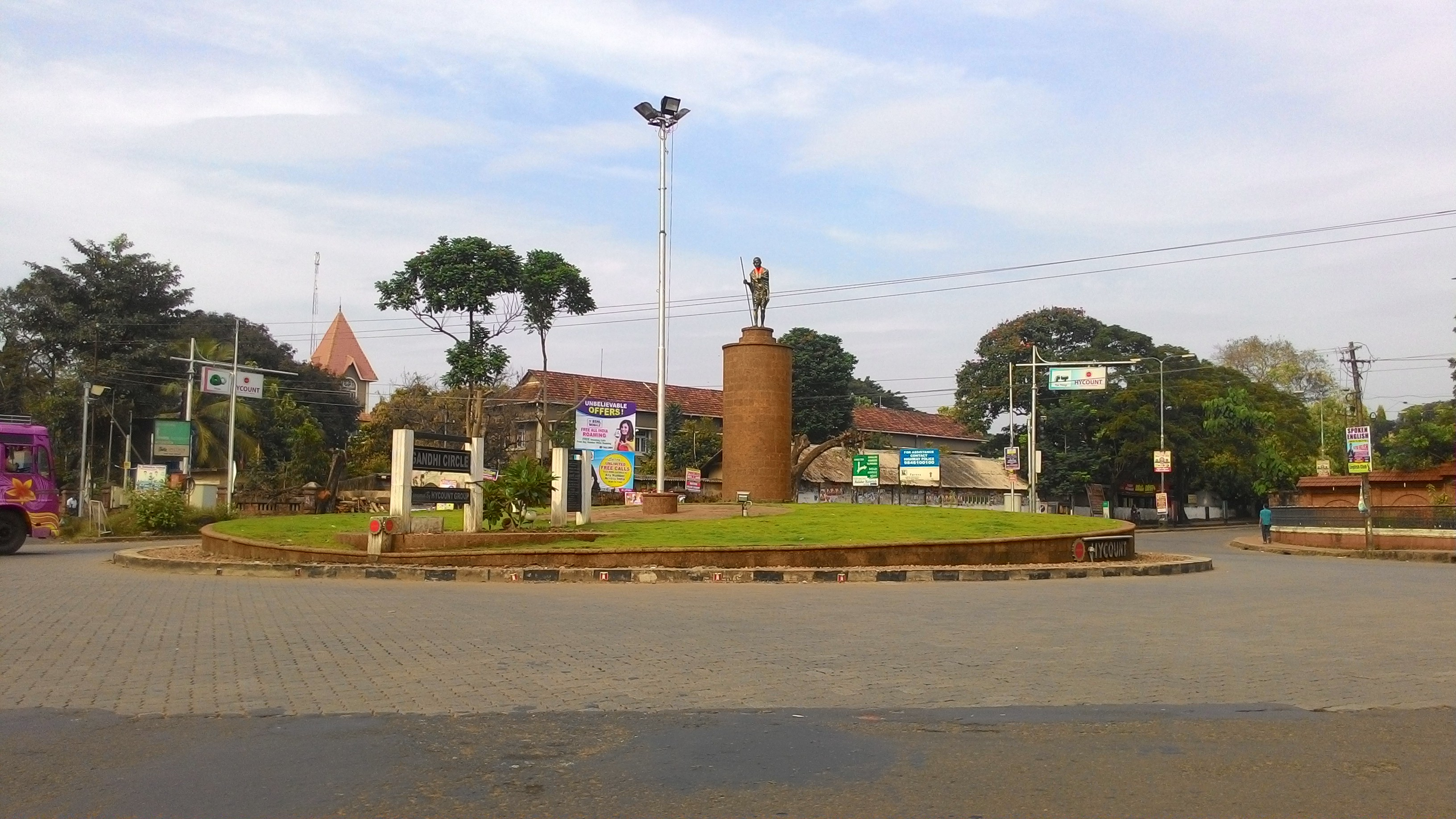
Caltex Junction

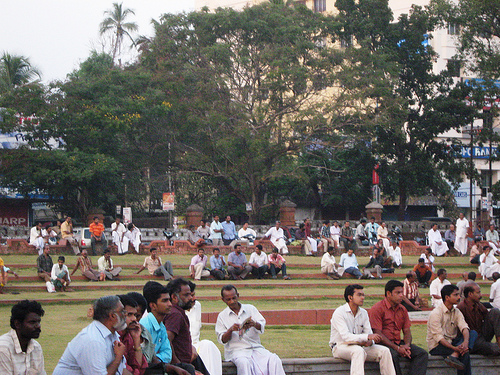
Police Grounds
