= Mullappally Ramachandran =

Indian politician (born 1944)

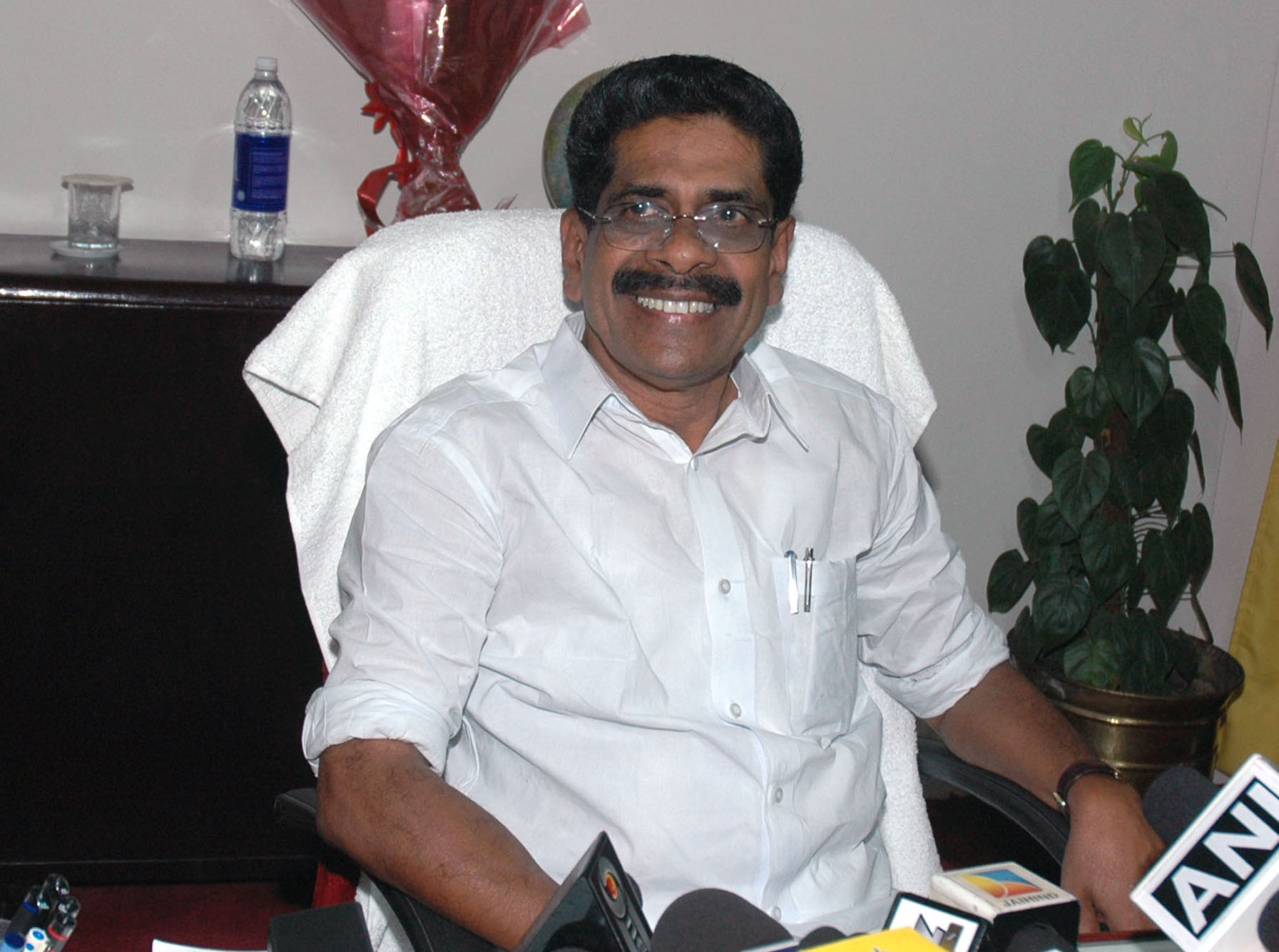

President, Kerala Pradesh Congress Committee
- In office 19 September 2018 – 16 June 2021
- Preceded by: M. M. Hassan
- Succeeded by: K. Sudhakaran

Minister of State for Home Affairs
- In office 28 May 2009 – 26 May 2014; Served along with R. P. N. Singh (2012-14)
- Prime Minister: Manmohan Singh
- Minister: P. Chidambaram (2009-12); Sushilkumar Shinde (2012-14)
- Preceded by: Sriprakash Jaiswal
- Succeeded by: Kiren Rijiju

Member of Parliament, Lok Sabha
- In office 16 May 2009 – 23 May 2019
- Preceded by: P. Satheedevi
- Succeeded by: K. Muraleedharan
- Constituency: Vatakara
- In office 28 December 1984 – 10 October 1999
- Preceded by: K. Kunhambu
- Succeeded by: A. P. Abdullakutty
- Constituency: Kannur

Personal details
- Born: 7 November 1944 (age 81) Kozhikode, Madras Province, British India (present day Kerala, India)
- Party: Indian National Congress
- Spouse: Usha Ramachandran
- Education: Government Law College, Kozhikode (Bachelor of Laws); Kerala University (Master of Arts)
- Website: mullappallyramachandran.com

Mullappally Ramachandran (born 7 November 1944) is an Indian politician and former president of the Kerala Pradesh Congress Committee (KPCC). He is a member of the Indian National Congress, and the son of Congress leader Mullappally Gopalan.

Mullappally Ramachandran has returned five times consecutively to the 8th, 9th, 10th, 11th and 12th Lok Sabha from Kannur constituency, a strong fortress of rival party CPI(M). From 2009 to 2019, he was the Member of Parliament for Vatakara constituency. In the 15th Lok Sabha, he was Minister of State for Home Affairs, Govt. of India.

== Early life ==
He was born on 7 November 1944 in Chombala village in Vadakara taluk of Kozhikode district into a prominent Thiyya family, the son of Mullappally Gopalan, a freedom fighter, and Paru Amma. His educational qualification is M.A.L.L.B. After primary education, he obtained a degree in history from Madappally Government College and a law degree from Government Law College, and a post-graduate degree in history from Kerala University.

== Positions held ==
- 1969-70: Chairman, Congress Forum for Socialist Action
- 1970-71: President, Youth Congress, Calicut district
- 1977-82: President, Kerala Pradesh Youth Congress
- 1984-89: Member, Consultative Committee, Ministry of Human Resource Development
- 1984-: General-Secretary, Pradesh Congress Committee
- 1987-88: Member, Committee on Subordinate Legislation
- 1987-89: Member, Consultative Committee, Ministry of External Affairs
- 1987-90 :Member, Rules Committee
- 1988-95: Joint-Secretary, All India Congress Committee (Indira) [A.I.C.C.(I)]
- 1990-91: Member, Committee on Estimates
- Member, Consultative Committee, Ministry of Commerce; and Ministry of Tourism
- 1991-93: Union Minister of State, Agriculture and Cooperation
- 1993-96: Member, Committee on Industry
- Member, Central Advisory Committee on Light Houses
- Member, Select Committee on Transplantation of Human Organs Bill, 1993
- Member, Consultative Committee, Ministry of Information and Broadcasting
- 1996-97: Member, Committee on Commerce
- Member, Joint Committee on Salaries and Allowances Of Members of Parliament
- Member, Sub-Committee on Agricultural Exports
- Member, Consultative Committee, Ministry of Railways
- 1998-99: Member, Committee on Urban and Rural Development and Convenor of its Sub-Committee-I on Ministry of Urban Affairs and Employment; and Sub-Committee on Action Taken
- Member, Committee to review the rate of dividend payable by the Railway Undertakings
- Member, Consultative Committee, Ministry of Civil Aviation
- Member, Railway Convention Committee
- Member, South Zone Railway Advisory Committee
- 2000: General Secretary, KPCC
- 2005: Vice President, KPCC
- 2009-2014: Minister of State (Home)
- 2015: Chairman, Indian National Congress Central Election Authority
- 2018-2021: President, KPCC

Preceded by P. Satheedevi	Member of Parliament from Vatakara; 2009 – 2019	Succeeded by K. Muraleedharan

== Electoral performance ==
=== Lok Sabha ===
Year	Constituency	Party	Votes	%	Opponent	Party	Votes	%	Result	Margin	%
1980	Badagara	INC(I)	230,114	45.85	K.P. Unnikrishnan	INC(U)	271,796	54.15	Lost	▼41,682	▼8.30
1984	Cannanore	INC	288,791	51.66	Pattiam Rajan	CPI(M)	263,738	47.18	Won	▲25,053	▲4.48
1989	Cannanore	INC	391,042	50.30	P. Sasi	CPI(M)	348,638	44.85	Won	▲42,404	▲5.45
1991	Cannanore	INC	376,696	50.58	E. Ebranhim Kutty	CPI(M)	335,569	45.06	Won	▲41,127	▲5.52
1996	Cannanore	INC	371,924	49.07	K. Ramachandran	IC(S)	332,622	43.89	Won	▲39,302	▲5.18
1998	Cannanore	INC	380,465	46.44	A.C. Shanmukha Das	IND	378,285	46.17	Won	▲2,180	▲0.27
1999	Cannanore	INC	418,143	47.51	A.P. Abdullakkutty	CPI(M)	428,390	48.67	Lost	▼10,247	▼1.16
2004	Cannanore	INC	351,209	40.79	A.P. Abdullakutty	CPI(M)	435,058	50.53	Lost	▼83,849	▼9.74
2009	Vadakara	INC	421,255	48.82	Adv. P. Satheedevi	CPI(M)	365,069	42.31	Won	▲56,186	▲6.51
2014	Vadakara	INC	416,479	43.37	Adv. A.N. Shamseer	CPI(M)	413,173	43.03	Won	▲3,306	▲0.34

== Controversy ==
In June 2020, he made some controversial comments against the health minister K.K Shailaja, calling her Covid Rani (Covid Queen). In November 2020, he entered into controversy again as he stated "women with self respect will die if she is raped, or else try not to be sexually assaulted again". Later, he claimed that his remarks on rape survivors are being 'portrayed as anti-women by others.
