= A. P. Abdullakutty =

Indian politician (born 1967)

A. P. Abdullakutt

Member of Parliament, Lok Sabha
- In office 1999 – 2009
- Preceded by: Mullappally Ramachandran
- Succeeded by: K. Sudhakaran
- Constituency: Kannur

Member of the Legislative Assembly
- In office 2009 – 2016
- Preceded by: K. Sudhakaran
- Succeeded by: Kadannappalli Ramachandran
- Constituency: Kannur

National Vice President of the Bharatiya Janata Party
- In office 26 September 2020 – 17 August 2026
- President: J. P. Nadda

Personal details
- Born: 8 May 1968 (age 58) Kannur, Kerala, India
- Party: Bharatiya Janata Party (since 2019)
- Other political affiliations: Communist Party of India (Marxist) (till 2009); Indian National Congress (2009-2019)
- Spouse: Dr. V. N. Rosina (m. 2000)
- Children: 2
- Education: S. N. College, Kannur

Aruvanpalli Puthiyapurayil Abdullakkutty (born 8 May 1967) is an Indian politician. He has served as the National Vice President of the Bharatiya Janata Party and the BJP Vice President of Kerala state. He is also a former member of Lok Sabha from Kannur and former MLA from Kannur constituency of Kerala state.

Abdullakutty was appointed National Haj Committee chairman 22 April 2022.

== Early life and politics ==
He was a leader during his college days, Abdullakutty became the General Secretary of Calicut University Students' Union in 1989. He served as Member of the Kannur District Panchayat from 1995 to 1999. He was elected to Parliament from Kannur Lok Sabha constituency twice (1999–2009) and was one of the youngest MPs of the country during that time. In 2008, he praised Gujarat Chief Minister Narendra Modi, and was expelled from CPI(M) in 2009. He subsequently joined INC. He represented the Kannur Lok Sabha constituency of Kerala in the 13th and 14th Lok Sabha (two terms) and was a Member of Kerala Legislative Assembly from 2009 to 2016.

During May 2019, in a Facebook post, Abdullakutty praised some of Prime Minister Narendra Modi's schemes, such as the Swachh Bharat Mission (cleanliness drive), and the Pradhan Mantri Ujjwala Yojana for free LPG connection. He added that the "NDA's victory was an acceptance of Prime Minister Modi's development agenda and the secret of his success was that he adopted Gandhian values", and further stated that "Through 'Swacchhta Bharat' PM gave toilets to 9.26 crore families, also gave free LPG connections to six crore families." After Abdullakutty's favorable appraisal of the prime minister, he was expelled from his party, the Indian National Congress (INC) in June 2019.

After a meeting with Narendra Modi and BJP President Amit Shah on 24 June 2019, Abdullakutty was invited to join the BJP, and he formally joined BJP on 26 June 2019. Abdullakutty received the BJP membership from party working president J. P. Nadda, Minister of State for Foreign Affairs, V. Muraleedharan, Dharmendra Pradhan, Minister of Petroleum & Natural Gas and Minister of Steel, Bhupender Yadav, Member of Parliament in the Rajya Sabha and National General Secretary of the BJP, Rajeev Chandrasekhar, MP (Upper house) and the vice-chairman of the Kerala wing of Bharatiya Janata Party-led coalition National Democratic Alliance (NDA) was among those present to greet him. He contested as NDA candidate in 2021 Malappuram Lok Sabha by-election against IUML Candidate M P AbduSamad Samadani and SFI national president VP Sanu and lost in a big margin.

== Controversies ==
On 17 January 2009, CPI(M) Mayyil Area committee suspended Abdullakutty from the party for one year for praising the then Gujarat Chief Minister Narendra Modi's Gujarat development model.

On 11 March 2014, Kerala Police registered an FIR against Kannur MLA AP Abdullakutty on rape charges based on the complaint filed by solar scam accused Saritha S Nair on Monday. In her complaint Saritha Nair alleged that she was raped by Abdullakutty at Mascot hotel in Thiruvananthapuram prior to her arrest in the solar scam. Cantonment women's police in Thiruvananthapuram said that no date or time of the incident is mentioned in her complaint.
