= K. V. Sumesh =

Indian politician

Member of the Kerala Legislative Assembly for Azhikode
- Incumbent
- Assumed office May 2021
- Preceded by: K. M. Shaji

Personal details
- Born: Kerala
- Party: Communist Party of India (Marxist)
- Education: Kannur University, Campus

K. V. Sumesh is an Indian politician of CPIM serving as the MLA of Azhikode Constituency since May 2021. He defeated sitting MLA K. M. Shaji by a vote margin of 6141 votes. He is also CPIM Kannur District Member, former Kannur district panchayat President.
