= Mayyil =

- Census Town
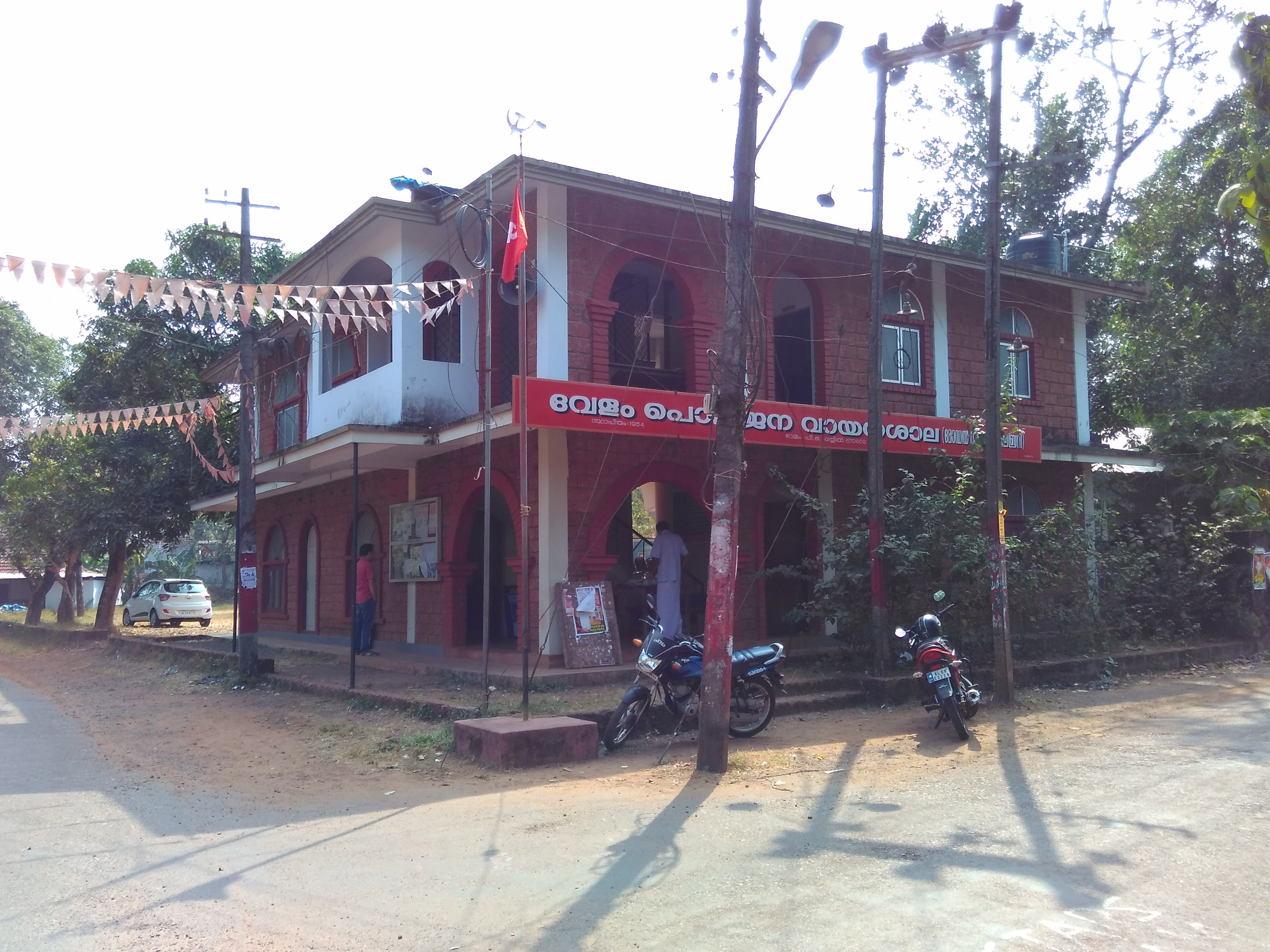
- Velam public library

- Location in Kerala, India Mayyil (India)
- Coordinates: 12.04°N 75.46°E
- Country: India
- State: Kerala
- District: Kannur
- Taluk: Taliparamba

Government
  - Type: Panchayati raj (India)
  - Body: Mayyil Grama Panchayat

Area
  - Total: 33.08 km^{2} (12.77 sq mi)
- Elevation: 45 m (148 ft)

Population (2011)
  - Total: 29,649
  - Density: 896.3/km^{2} (2,321/sq mi)

Languages
  - Official: Malayalam, English
- Time zone: UTC+5:30 (IST)
- PIN: 670602
- ISO 3166 code: IN-KL
- Vehicle registration: KL59
- Nearest city: Kannur
- Assembly constituency: Taliparamba
- Lok Sabha constituency: Kannur

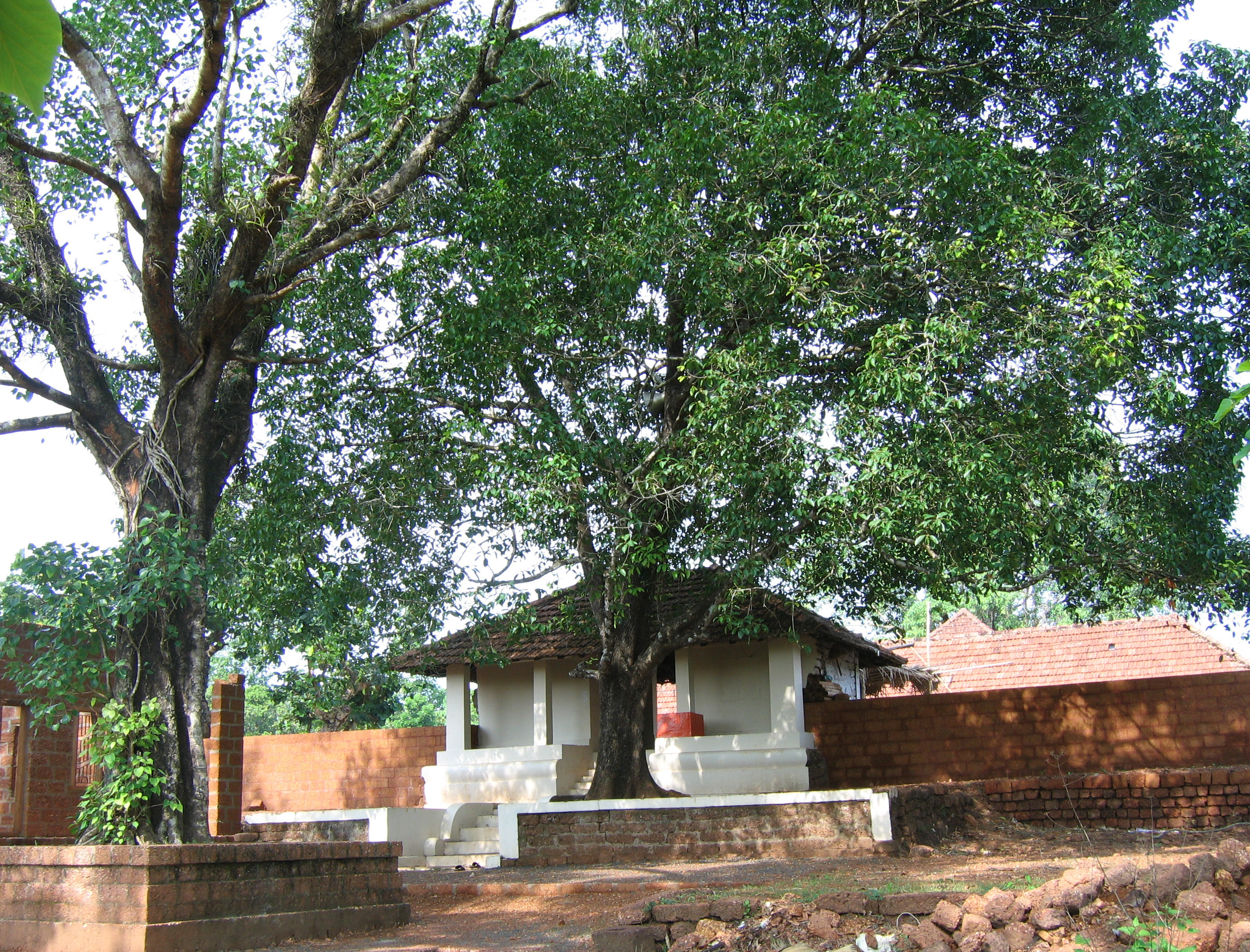
Arimbra Subrahmanya Temple

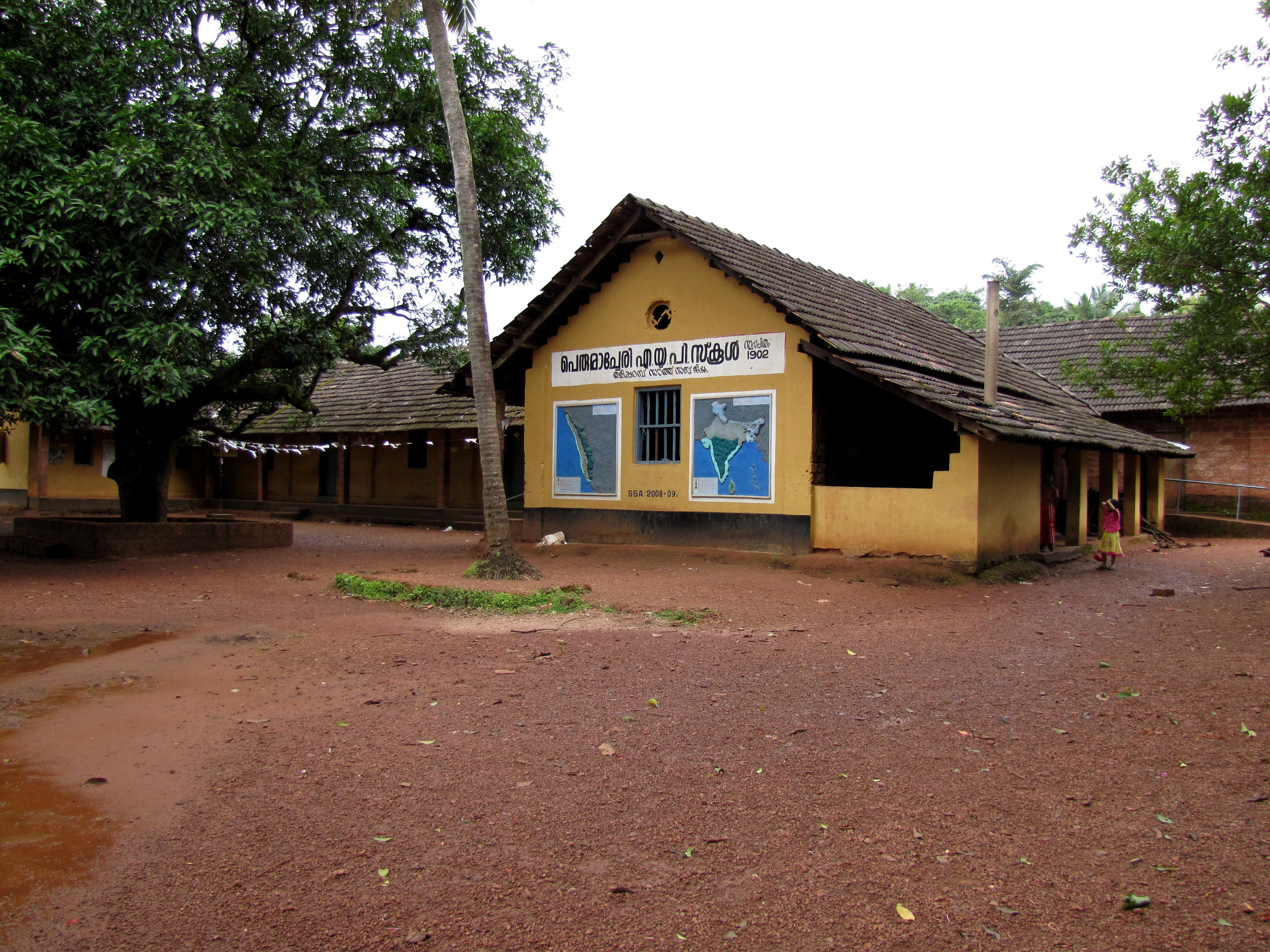
Perumacheri AUP School, Kolacherry, Mayyil

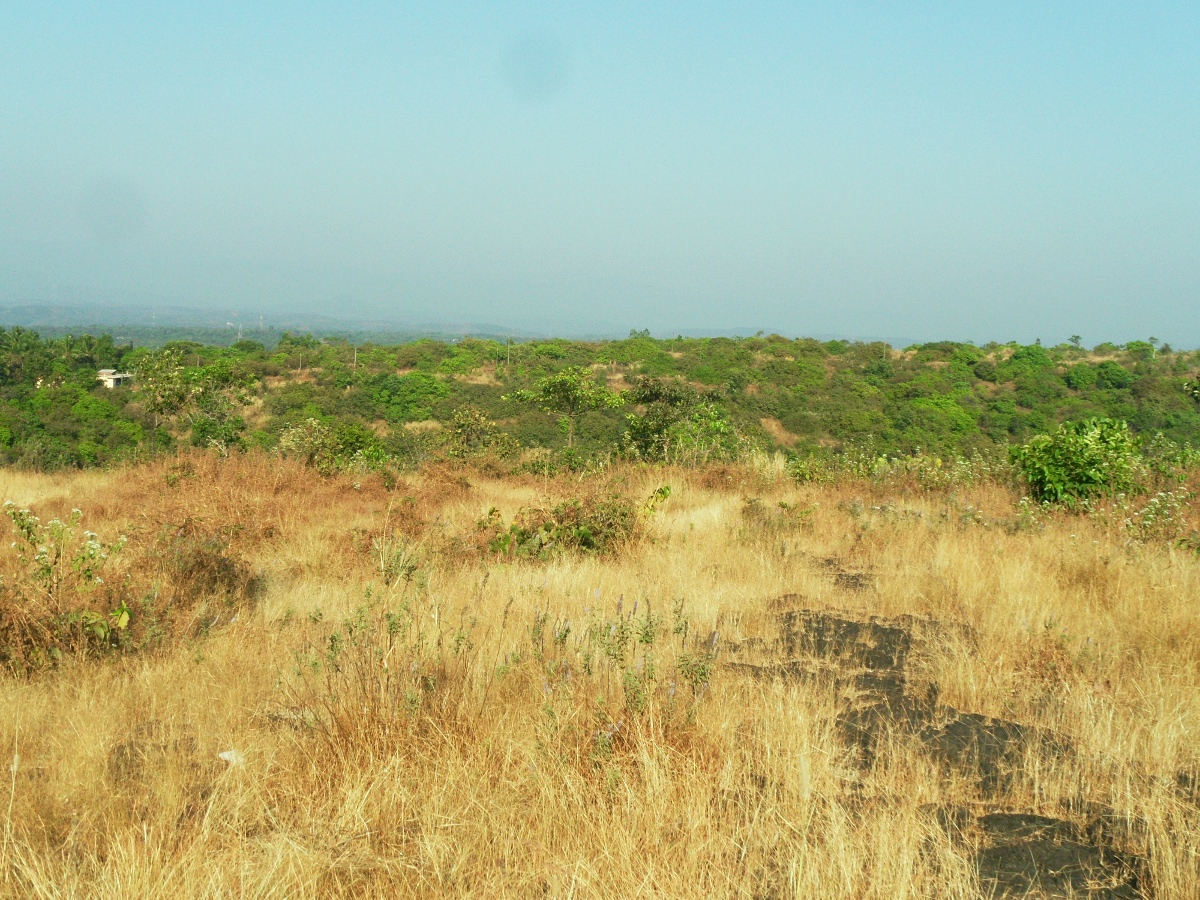
Padikkunnu

Mayyil is a Census Town and Grama Panchayat in Kannur District of Kerala State. Mayyil Panchayat established in 1962 by merging the villages of Kayaralam, Mayyil and Kandakkai.

== Location ==
Mayyil is located 20 kilometres (12 mi) northeast of the district headquarters Kannur, 13.5 kilometres (8.4 mi) southeast of the taluk headquarters Taliparamba, 21 kilometres (13 mi) northwest of Mattanur, 13 kilometres (8.1 mi) southwest of Sreekandapuram and 15 kilometres (9.3 mi) west of Irikkur.

== Educational institutions ==
- IMNS GHSS, Mayyil
- MAYYIL ALP School, Mayyil
- Institute of Technology, Mayyil
- ITM Arts & Science College, Mayyil
- Kayaralam AUP School
- Kayaralam North ALP School
- ITM Public School, Mayyil
- Mayyil Teacher Training Institute, Mayyil
- Mullakkodi AUP School, Arimbra, Mullakkodi
- Mullakkodi LP School, Mullakkodi
- Kandakkai K V A L P school, Kandakkai
- Kandakai LP School, Kandakai
- Thayampoyil ALP School, Thayampoyi
- Perumachery AUP school, Perumachery
- Pavannur ALP School, Pavannur
- Peruvangoor ALP School, Peruvangoor
- Spangle Academy, Professional Training, Kambil
- Cherupazhassi ALP School, Cherupazhassi

== Temples ==
- Velam maha ganapathi temple
- Chekiyattu sree darmashata temple
- Chekiyattu sree maha vishnu temple
- Nechikottu kavu, Kayaralam
- Chalagottu kavu, Kandakkai
- Arimbra Subhramanya Temple
- Sree Puthiya Bhagavathi Kaavu, Kaavinmoola
- Kandanaar Poyil Sree Muchilott Bhagavathi Kshethram, Cherupazhassi
- Kadoor Sree Ganapathi Shethram, Kadoor
- Udayam kottam shiva kshethram, kadoor ambalam
- Nambram Sree Muchilott Bhagavathi Kshethram, Naniyoor Nambram
- Kandakkai Kunnummal Muthappan Madappura
- Karonnan Kottam, Kayaralam
- Thalakkott Muchilott Kavu
- Thrikapaleswaram Sree Durga Devi Kshethram, Cherupazhassi

== Administration ==
Mayyil Panchayat is part of Irikkur Block Panchayat. Mayyil is politically a part of Taliparamba Assembly constituency under Kannur Loksabha constituency.

== Transportation ==
The national highway(NH 66) passes through Puthiyatheru (15 km south-west), Dharmasala (11 km west), Taliparamba (13 km north-west) away from Mayyil town. Goa and Mumbai can be accessed on the northern side and Cochin and Thiruvananthapuram can be accessed on the southern side. The road to the east of Iritty connects to Mysore and Bangalore.

The nearest railway station is Kannur on Mangalore-Palakkad line. Trains are available to almost all parts of India subject to advance booking over the internet. There are airports at Mattanur, Mangalore and Calicut. All of them are international airports but direct flights are available only to Middle Eastern countries. The nearest is Kannur International Airport located near Mattannur, about 24 km away from Mayyil, and the proposed 4 line airport road from Taliparamba to Mattannur passes through Mayyil.

== Demographics ==
As of 2011 Indian census, Mayyil census town had population of 12,490 among which 5,768 are males and 6,722 are females. Total geographic area of mayyil census town is 12.77 km^{2} (4.93 sq mi). Population of age group in 0-6 was 1,557 (12.5%) which constitutes 771 males and 786 females. Literacy rate of Mayyil town was 92.7% lower than state average of 94% where male literacy was 96.2% while female literacy rate was 89.7%.

Mayyil Grama Panchayat had total population of 29,649 which constitutes 13,810 males and 15,839 with an area spreads over 33.1 km^{2} (12.8 sq mi) and 6,387 households. Mayyil panchayat has administration over Mayyil census town (urban) and Kayaralam village (rural).

== Religion ==
As of 2011 India census, Mayyil census town had total population of 12,490 which constitute 59.8% Hindus, 40% Muslims and 0.2% others.

== Geography ==
Mayyil is surrounded by around half of its boundary by Valapattanam river.

== Libraries ==
The panchayat has a population of about 30,000 people in 33.08 km^{2} (12.77 sq mi) with a literacy rate of 93.52 percent, has 35 functioning libraries, the highest for a local body in Kerala state, all of which are digitally connected.
