= Malapattam =

- village
- Location in Kerala, India Malapattam (India)
- Coordinates: 12.04°N 75.46°E
- Country: India
- State: Kerala
- District: Kannur

Area
  - Total: 19.34 km^{2} (7.47 sq mi)

Population (2011)
  - Total: 9,628
  - Density: 497.8/km^{2} (1,289/sq mi)

Languages
  - Official: Malayalam, English
- Time zone: UTC+5:30 (IST)
- ISO 3166 code: IN-KL

Malapattam is a village in Kannur district in the Indian state of Kerala.

== Demographics ==
As of 2011 Census, Malapattam had a population of 9,628 with 4,497 (46.7%) males and 5,131 (53.3%) females. Malapattam village has an area of 19.34 km^{2} (7.47 sq mi) with 2,250 families residing in it. The male female sex ratio was 1,141 lower than state average of 1,084. In Malapattam, 10.55% of the population was under 6 years age. Malapattam had overall literacy of 92.9% higher than national average of 59% and lower than state average of 94%.

== Transportation ==
Malapattam was a traditionally isolated and remote village. The new bridge built in 2004 changed the situation and made a straight access to Kannur city. The national highway passes through Kannur town. Goa and Mumbai can be accessed on the northern side and Cochin and Thiruvananthapuram can be accessed on the southern side. The road to the east of Iritty connects to Mysore and Bangalore. The nearest railway station is Kannur on Mangalore-Palakkad line. Trains are available to almost all parts of India subject to advance booking over the internet. There are airports at Mattanur, Mangalore and Calicut. All of them are international airports but direct flights are available only to Middle Eastern countries.
