= Chadayan Govindan =

Indian politician (1929–1998)

Secretary, CPI(M) Kerala State Committee
- In office 1996-1998
- Preceded by: E.K. Nayanar
- Succeeded by: Pinarayi Vijayan
- Constituency: Azhikode

Personal details
- Born: 12 May 1929 Kambil, Kannur, British India
- Died: 9 September 1998 (aged 69) Thiruvananthapuram, Kerala, India
- Party: Communist Party of India (Marxist)
- Children: 4

Chadayan Govindan was a Communist politician and a former minister Of Kerala. He was the secretary of The Kerala State Committee of Communist Party of India (Marxist) (CPI(M)) until his death on 9 September 1998.

== Early life ==
Chadayan Govindan Was Born On 12 May 1929 In Kambil, Kolachery Panchayat In Kannur. His Father Was Kunhappa And His Mother Was Kalyani. His Family Was Very Poor And His School Education Had To Be Stopped In The Fifth Class. He Started Working As A Weaver From Young Age.

== Political life ==
Govindan became a party cell member in 1948. He resisted the physical attacks goondas very boldly and this gave him the image of a fire brand worker. His house was attacked following a march he organised as part of the Malabar District Board elections in 1949. His weaving equipments were destroyed. He went to Karnataka and engaged in a manual work.

After the Padikkunnu shooting, Chadayan Govindan was arrested and tortured in the police camp for one week. News came out that he was dead and hearing this people assembled in front of the camp. Later police informed that he was alive. He was arrested in 1965 as part of the nationwide assault on left wing leaders framing them as ‘Chinese Agents’. He has spent many years in the underground for party work.

Chadayan Govindan became Communist Party Irikkur Farka Committee Member in 1952 and became a full-time party worker in 1962. In 1964, he was Kannur Taluk Committee Member and District Council member of CPI. Later he became a member of CPI (M) Kannur district committee. In 1977 he was elected as Kannur District Committee Secretariat member and State Committee Member in 1978. He became Kannur District Secretary in 1979 and a member of the State Secretariat in 1985. Later he became the state secretary of CPI (M) in Kerala. He was a member of Narath Panchayat Board in 1954. He was elected to the Kerala Assembly from Azheekode Constituency in 1977. He was elected as the State Secretary of CPI (M) in 1996, when the then Secretary and former Chief Minister of Kerala E. K. Nayanar stepped down to become the Chief Minister for the third time. He suffered from cancer during his final days, and had frequent admissions in the R. C. C. in Thiruvananthapuram. He was admitted there for the final time on 25 August 1998, and died at 2:40 AM on 9 September, aged 69. His dead body was taken to his native place Kannur, and was cremated at Payyambalam Beach in the presence of numerous dignitaries, including Nayanar. He was survived by his wife and four sons. Pinarayi Vijayan, the then State Cabinet Minister for Electricity and Co-operation and former Chief Minister and current Opposition Leader of Kerala, succeeded him as the State Secretary of CPI (M).
