= Kannur (disambiguation) =

Kannur is a city in Kerala, India. It may also refer to:

- Kannur International Airport, an airport in the city
- Kannur district, a district in Kerala
- Kannur taluk, one among the 5 taluks of Kannur district
- Kannur Lok Sabha constituency, a parliamentary constituency in India
- Kannur Assembly constituency, an assembly constituency in Kerala
- Kannur railway station, a major railway station in Kerala
- Peral-Kannur, a village in Puthige Panchayat of Kasaragod district
- Kannur, a 1997 Indian Malayalam-language film
  - Veendum Kannur, a 2012 sequel

== See also ==
- Cannanore (disambiguation)
