= Cannanore (disambiguation) =

Kannur, formerly Cannanore, is a city in the Indian state of Kerala.

Cannanore or Kannur may also refer to:

- Kannur district, a district in Kerala, India
  - Kannur taluk, one among the five taluks of Kannur district
  - Kannur Lok Sabha constituency, a parliamentary constituency in India
  - Kannur Assembly constituency, an assembly constituency in Kerala
  - Kannur railway station, a major railway station in Kannur
- Kolathunadu (later Chirakkal kingdom), feudal kingdoms of medieval India
- Arakkal Kingdom, a former kingdom of India
- Laccadive Islands also Cannanore Islands, an island group of Lakshadweep, India

== See also ==
- Kannur (disambiguation)
