= Chembilode =

Grama Panchayat in Kerala, India

- Town
- Interactive map of Chembilode
- Coordinates: 11.8701°N 75.4538°E
- Country: India
- State: Kerala
- District: Kannur
- Taluk: Kannur
- Block Panchayat: Edakkad

Government
  - Type: Panchayat raj
  - Body: Chembilode Grama Panchayat

Area
  - Total: 20.99 km^{2} (8.10 sq mi)

Population (2011)
  - Total: 34,319
  - Density: 1,635/km^{2} (4,235/sq mi)

Languages
  - Official: Malayalam, English
- Time zone: UTC+5:30 (IST)
- PIN: 670621
- Vehicle registration: KL-13
- Literacy: 96.6%
- Sex ratio: 1204 ♂/♀
- Niyamasabha constituency: Dharmadam
- Lok Sabha constituency: Kannur
- Website: https://chembilodepanchayat.lsgkerala.gov.in/

Chembilode is a grama panchayat and revenue village in Kannur district of Kerala, India. It is located in Edakkad block panchayat and part of Kannur taluk.

== Geography ==
Chembilode is an urban panchayat which covers two census towns, Chala and Iriveri. Chembilode revenue village covers Chala CT area. The panchayat is bordered by Kannur Municipal Corporation and Munderi panchayat to the north, Kannur corporation to the west, Anjarakandy panchayat to the east, and Peralasseri and Kadambur panchayats to the south.

== Demographics ==
As per the 2011 Census of India, Chembilode Grama Panchayat had a population of 34,319 with 15,571 males and 18,748 females. The male female sex ratio was 1204 women per 1000 men. The total number of households were 7,050. The population in the age group 0-6 were 3,931, comprises 1,977 males and 1,954 females. The total number of literates were 29,357 with a literacy rate of 96.6%, higher than Kerala state average of 94%. The male literates were 13,324 (98%) and female literates were 16,033 (95.5%).

== Administration ==
Chembilode grama panchayat is divided into 21 wards, where elections are held for every five years. As of the 2025 Kerala local elections, the ruling party is LDF, who won 11 out of the 21 wards. Chembilode is part of Dharmadam Assembly constituency and Kannur Lok Sabha constituency. Chembilode Grama Panchayat emerged as front-runner in 100% fund utilisation among the panchayats in Kannur district for three consecutive years from 2007 to 2010.

=== Ward list ===
Chembilode panchayat comprises of the following 21 wards.

Ward no.	Name	Ward no.	Name
1	Chembilode North	2	Chembilode Central
3	Mowanchery	4	Chakkarakkal
5	Kanayannur North	6	Kanayannur East
7	Midavilode	8	Kanayannur West
9	Kakkoth	10	Vellachal
11	Iriveri	12	Muthukutti
13	Thalavil	14	Koyyode Central
15	Koyyode South	16	Thannada
17	Chala South	18	Chala North
19	Koyyode Maniyalamchira	20	Koyyode
21	Chembilode South		

== Educational Institutions ==
- Chembilode higher secondary school, Thalavil
- Chembilode UP school, Mowanchery
