= Chala, Kannur =

Chala
- Census Town
- Interactive map of Chala
- Coordinates: 11°50′50″N 75°26′00″E
- Country: India
- State: Kerala
- District: Kannur

Government
  - Body: Chembilode Grama Panchayat

Area
  - Total: 9.29 km^{2} (3.59 sq mi)

Population (2011)
  - Total: 17,088
  - Density: 1,840/km^{2} (4,760/sq mi)

Languages
  - Official: Malayalam, English
- Time zone: UTC+5:30 (IST)
- Vehicle registration: KL 13

Chala is a census town and suburb of Kannur city in the state of Kerala, India. It is located 10 km (6.2 mi) southeast of Kannur and lies on State Highway 38 towards Kuthuparamba and near National Highway 66. Chala census town falls under Chembilode Grama Panchayat while the western commercial area around Chala Junction (NH 66) is part of Kannur Municipal Corporation (ward number 32).

== Demographics ==
As of 2011 Census, Chala had a population of 17,088 with 7,698 males and 9,390 females. Chala census town has an area of 9.29 km (5.77 mi) with 3,486 families residing in it. Chala had an average literacy rate of 96.7%, higher than the state average of 94%. In Chala, 11% of the population was under 6 years of age.
