= Kannur taluk =

Taluk in Kerala, India

Kannur taluk is an administrative division of Kannur district of Kerala, India. Kannur district is divided into five taluks, Thalassery, Kannur, Payyanur, Iritty and Taliparamba. Thalassery has 35 villages, Kannur has 28, Payyanur has 22, Taliparamba has 28 villages and Iritty has 20 villages.

== Headquarters ==
The taluk office of Kannur is located at South Bazar or Caltex junction in Kannur. The headquarters is in an old British building near to the modern civil station.

== Constituent villages ==
Kannur Taluk has 28 villages.

- Anjarakkandy, Azhikode North, Azhikode South, Chelora
- Chembilode, Cherukkunnu, Chirakkal
- Edakkad, Elayavoor, Iriveri, Kadambur
- Kalliasseri, Kanhirode, Kannadiparamba, Kannapuram
- Kannur-1, Kannur-2, Makrery, Mattool
- Mavilayi, Munderi, Muzhappilangad, Narath
- Pallikkunnu, Pappinisseri, Puzhathi, Valapattanam and Valiyannur.

== Demographics ==
According to census 2011, Kannur taluk has a population of 784984 of which 360086 are male and 424898 were female.

== Religion ==
Religions in Kannur Sub district (2011)
1. Hinduism (60.6%)
2. Islam (36.2%)
3. Christianity (2.85%)
4. Other (0.29%)
