= Iriveri =

- Census Town
- Location in Kerala, India Iriveri (India)
- Coordinates: 11.871745°N 75.481007°E
- Country: India
- State: Kerala
- District: Kannur

Government
  - Type: Panchayati raj (India)
  - Body: Chembilode Panchayat

Area
  - Total: 11.77 km^{2} (4.54 sq mi)

Population (2011)
  - Total: 17,231
  - Density: 1,464/km^{2} (3,792/sq mi)

Languages
  - Official: Malayalam, English
- Time zone: UTC+5:30 (IST)
- ISO 3166 code: IN-KL
- Vehicle registration: KL 13

Iriveri is a census town in Kannur district in the Indian state of Kerala.

== Demographics ==
As of 2011 Census, Iriveri had a population of 17,232 with 7,873 males and 9,358 females. Iriveri census town has an area of 11.77 km^{2} (4.54 sq mi) with 3,564 families residing in it. The average sex ratio was 1189 higher than the state average of 1084. Iriveri had an average literacy rate of 96.5%, higher than the state average of 94%: male literacy was 98.2%, and female literacy was 95.1%. In Iriveri, 11.76% of the population was under 6 years of age.

== Economy ==
Agriculture, coconut and cashew plantations, Paddy and farmings are major occupation. Chakkarakkal is the nearest economical hub.

== Temples ==
One of the major attractions in Iriveri is the Iriveri Kavu, situated inside of a small forest, and is famous for Theyyam, a folk art performance during February. Ambiliyad Sri Krishna Temple and Manikkiyil Bhagavati Temple are also in Iriveri.

== Masjids ==
North Kerala's famous Muslim pilgrimage center Iriveri Juma Masjid and Makham situated in the middle of Iriveri and is famous for traditional Islamic Uroos and Nerchas, Iriveri Masjid was established in AD 702 by Khasi Hussain Madani (Ra).

== Transportation ==
The national highway passes through Kannur town. Goa and Mumbai can be accessed on the northern side and Cochin and Thiruvananthapuram can be accessed on the southern side. The road to the east of Iritty connects to Mysore and Bangalore. The nearest railway station is Kannur on Mangalore-Palakkad line. Trains are available to almost all parts of India subject to advance booking over the internet. There are airports at Mattanur, Mangalore and Calicut. All of them are international airports but direct flights are available only to Middle Eastern countries.
