= Kanhirode =

- Census Town
- Location in Kerala, India Kanhirode (India)
- Coordinates: 11.9083°N 75.4590°E
- Country: India
- State: Kerala
- District: Kannur
- Taluk: Kanuur

Government
  - Body: Munderi Grama Panchayat

Area
  - Total: 8.13 km^{2} (3.14 sq mi)

Population (2011)
  - Total: 15,353
  - Density: 1,890/km^{2} (4,890/sq mi)

Languages
  - Official: Malayalam, English
- Time zone: UTC+5:30 (IST)
- PIN: 670592
- ISO 3166 code: IN-KL
- Vehicle registration: KL 13

Kanhirode is a census town in Kannur district of Kerala state, India. Kanhirode is located 13 km east of Kannur city on Kannur-Mattanur road.

== Demographics ==
As of 2011 Census, Kanhirode had a population of 15,353 which constitute 7,099 males and 8,254 females. Kanhirode census town have an area of 8.13 km^{2} (3.14 sq mi) with 3,145 families residing in it. The average sex ratio was 1163 higher than the state average of 1084. In Kanhirode, 11.6% of the population was under 6 years of age. Kanhirode had an average literacy of 95.9% higher than the state average of 94%; male literacy was 98.2% and female literacy was 94%.

== Religion ==
As of 2011 India census, Kanhirode town had a population of 15,353 among which 8,917 (58%) are Hindus, 6318 (41.15%) are Muslims and 0.85% others.

== Administration ==
Kanhirode census town is a part of Munderi Grama Panchayat in Edakkad Block Panchayat. Kanhirode is politically part of Kannur Assembly constituency under Kannur Lok Sabha constituency.
