= Munderi, Kannur =

Munderi
- Census Town
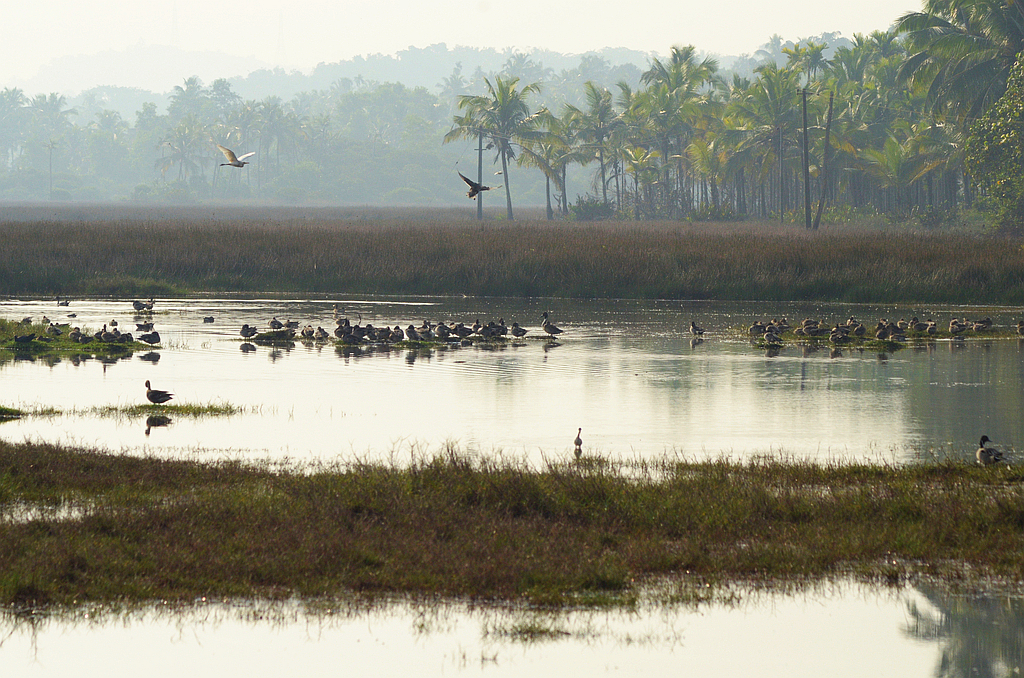
- Munderikkadavu Bird Sanctuary
- Interactive map of Munderi
- Coordinates: 11.9265°N 75.4393°E
- Country: India
- State: Kerala
- District: Kannur

Government
  - Type: Panchayat Raj
  - Body: Munderi Grama Panchayat

Area
  - Total: 12.29 km^{2} (4.75 sq mi)

Population (2011)
  - Total: 21,676
  - Density: 1,764/km^{2} (4,568/sq mi)

Languages
  - Official: Malayalam, English
- Time zone: UTC+5:30 (IST)
- ISO 3166 code: IN-KL

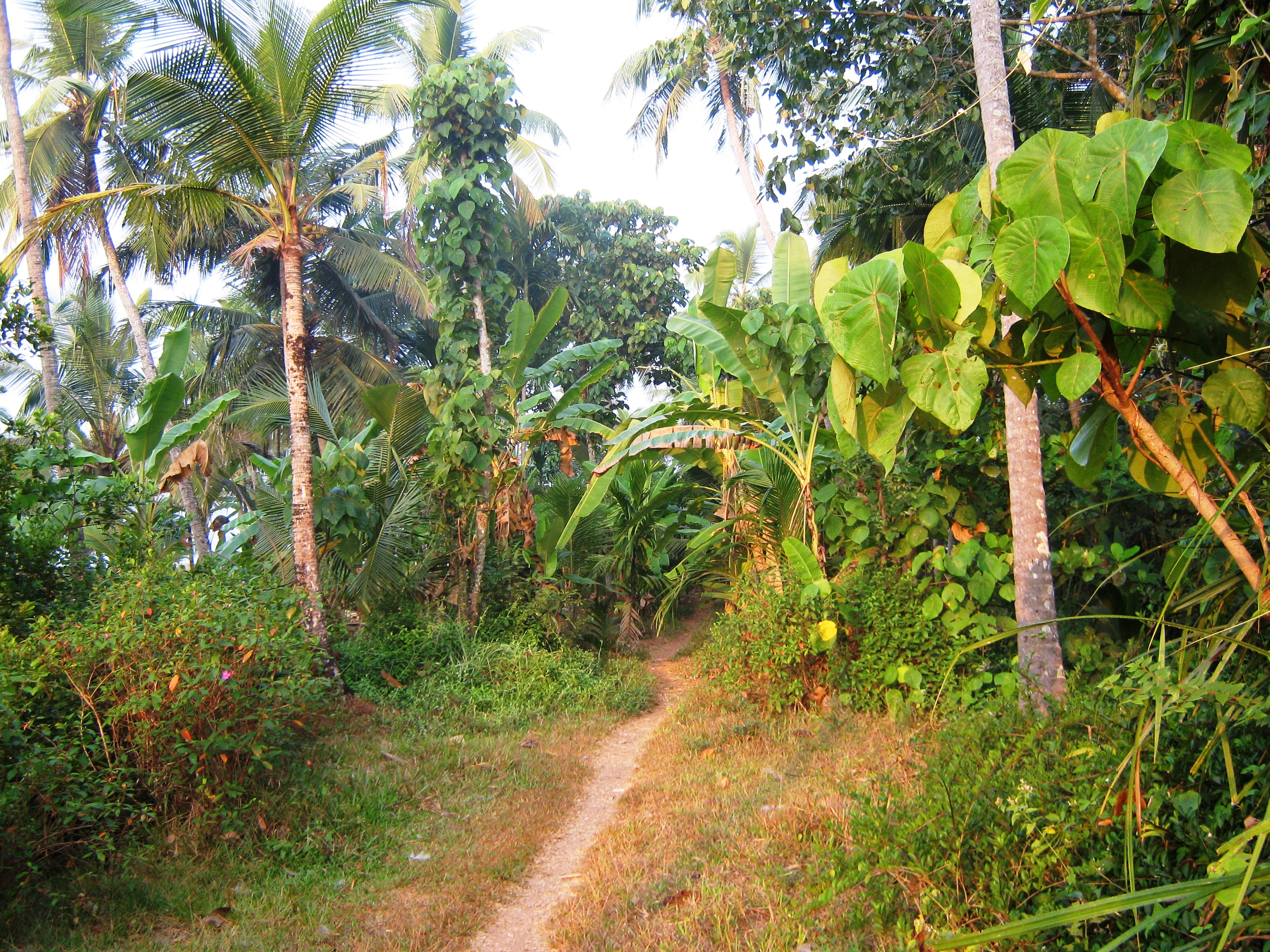
Munderi Motta

Munderi is a census town and grama panchayat in Kannur district in Kerala, India. The panchayat has a total population of 37,029 with 20.42 sq.km area and comprises of two revenue villages, Munderi and Kanhirode.

== Geography ==
Munderi Panchayat is bordered by Kolachery and Kuttiattoor panchayats to the north, Kannur Municipal Corporation to the west, Koodali Panchayat to the east, and Chembilode and Anjarakandy panchayats to the south.

== Administration ==
Munderi grama panchayat is administratively divided into 22 electoral wards and currently ruled by UDF party. It consists of Munderi and Kanhirode revenue villages. The panchayat is part of Edakkad block panchayat and politically falls under Kannur Assembly constituency and Kannur Lok Sabha constituency.

In the 2025 Kerala local elections, both the LDF and UDF won 11 seats each in the 22-member panchayat. The UDF's Raseena C.K. became president after a CPI(M) member's vote was declared invalid, and won the post of vice-president through a draw of lots after both fronts polled 11 votes each, with Congress' V. K. Sanesh being declared vice-president.

=== Ward list ===
Munderi Grama Panchayat is composed of the following 22 wards.

Ward no.	Name	Ward no.	Name
1	Munderi	2	Iruvankai
3	Kacheriparamb	4	Padannot
5	Puravoor	6	Eachur Kottam
7	Kudukkimotta	8	Kanhirode
9	Parothumchal	10	Thalamunda
11	Thattyode	12	Mowanchery
13	Kulathuvayal	14	Kanhirode Central
15	Kanhirode Theru	16	Ayyappanmala
17	Nallanchi	18	Eachur
19	Pannyottu	20	Mavilachal
21	Kanachery	22	Edayil Peedika

== Tourism ==
Munderi is home to the Munderi Kadavu Bird Sanctuary, a major wetland habitat forming part of the 7.5 km^{2} (2.9 sq mi) Kattampally wetland system. It is known for migratory birds and rich biodiversity, and is being developed into an eco-tourism hot spot. In March 2026, the first phase of an ecotourism initiative was inaugurated at Munderi Kadavu, introducing bird-watching towers and visitor facilities.

== Demographics ==
As of the 2011 Census of India, Munderi Census Town had a population of 21,676 in 4,246 households, comprising 9,904 males and 11,772 females, with a sex ratio of 1,189 females per 1,000 males. Munderi had a literacy rate of 94.9%, higher than the state average of 94%. Male literacy was 97.62% and female literacy was 92.64%.

== Educational Institutions ==
- Govt. HSS Munderi
- Munderi Central UP School
- Munderi East LP School
