= Kannur =

City in Kerala, India

Kannur Kaṇṇūr (Malayalam) Cannanore
- City
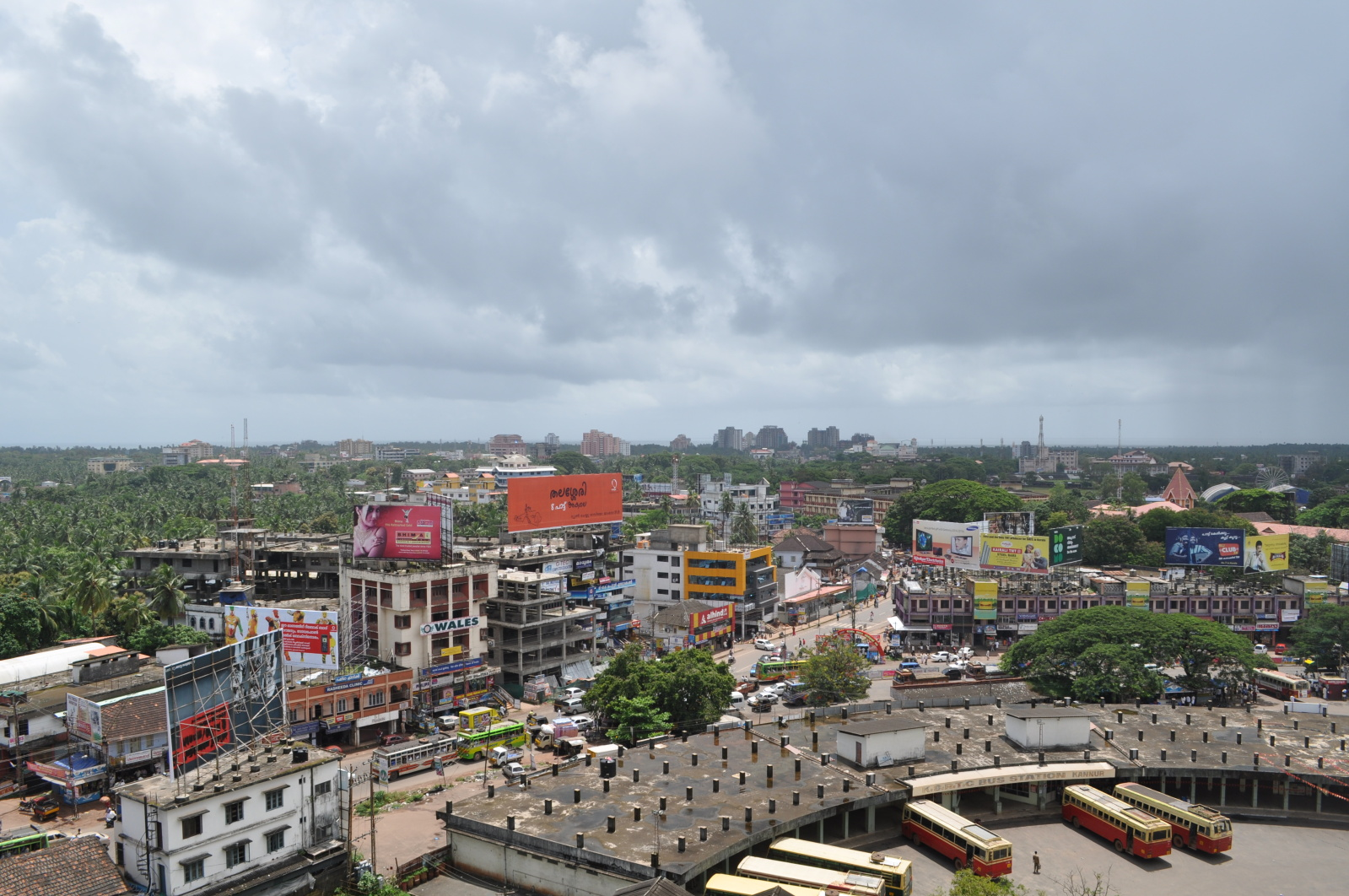
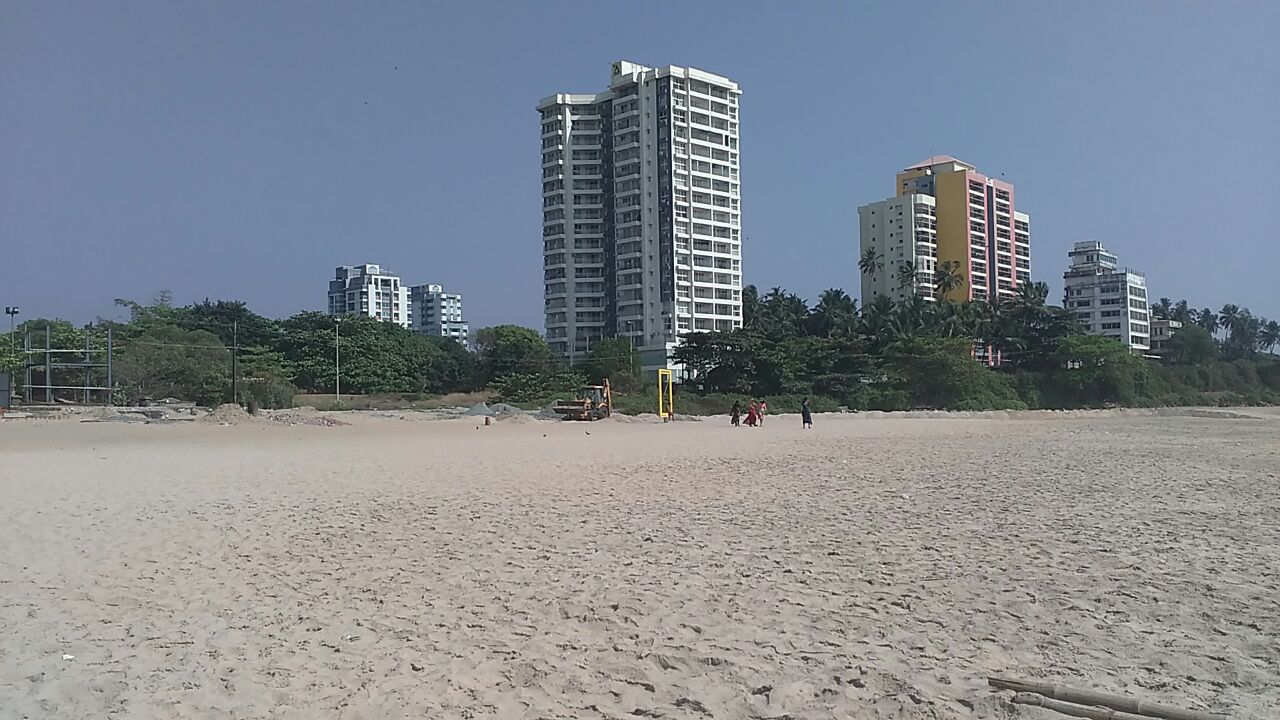
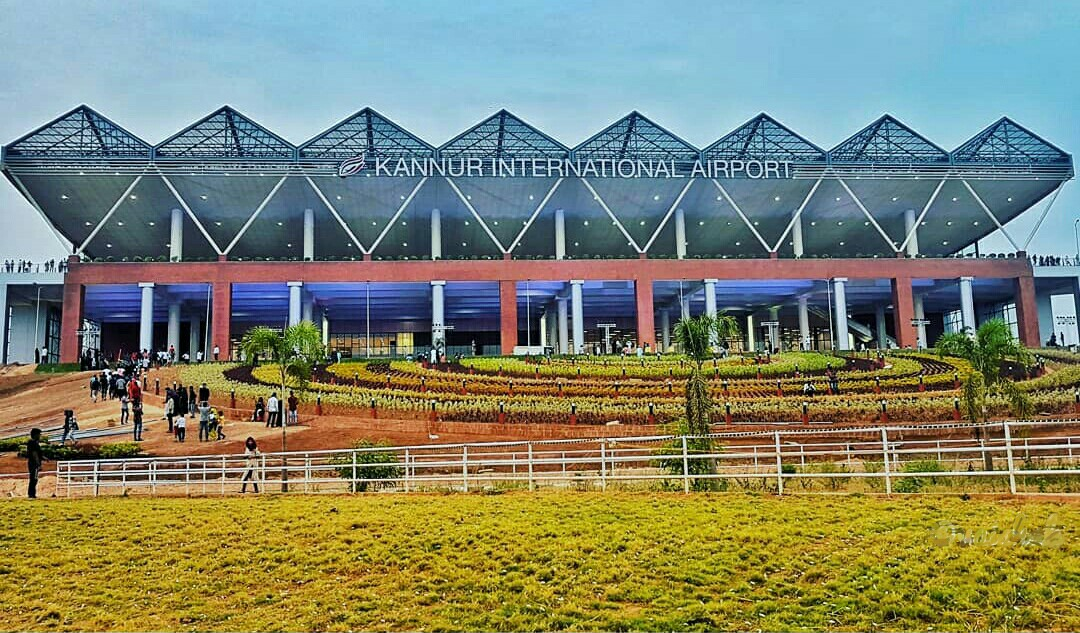
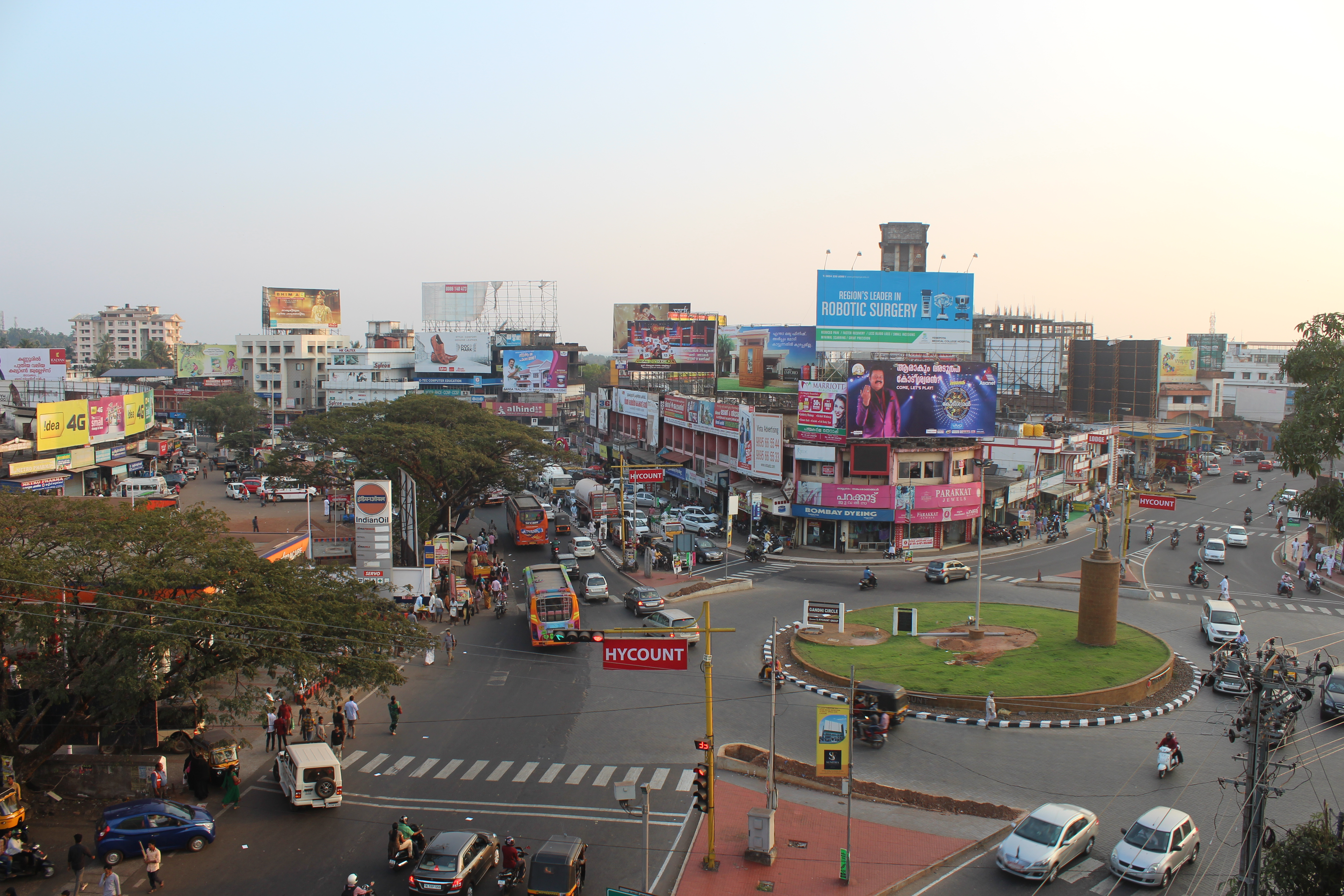
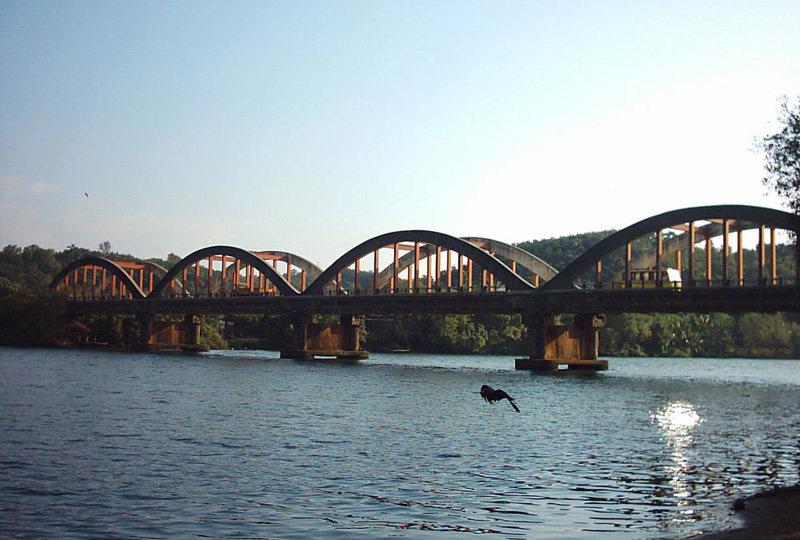
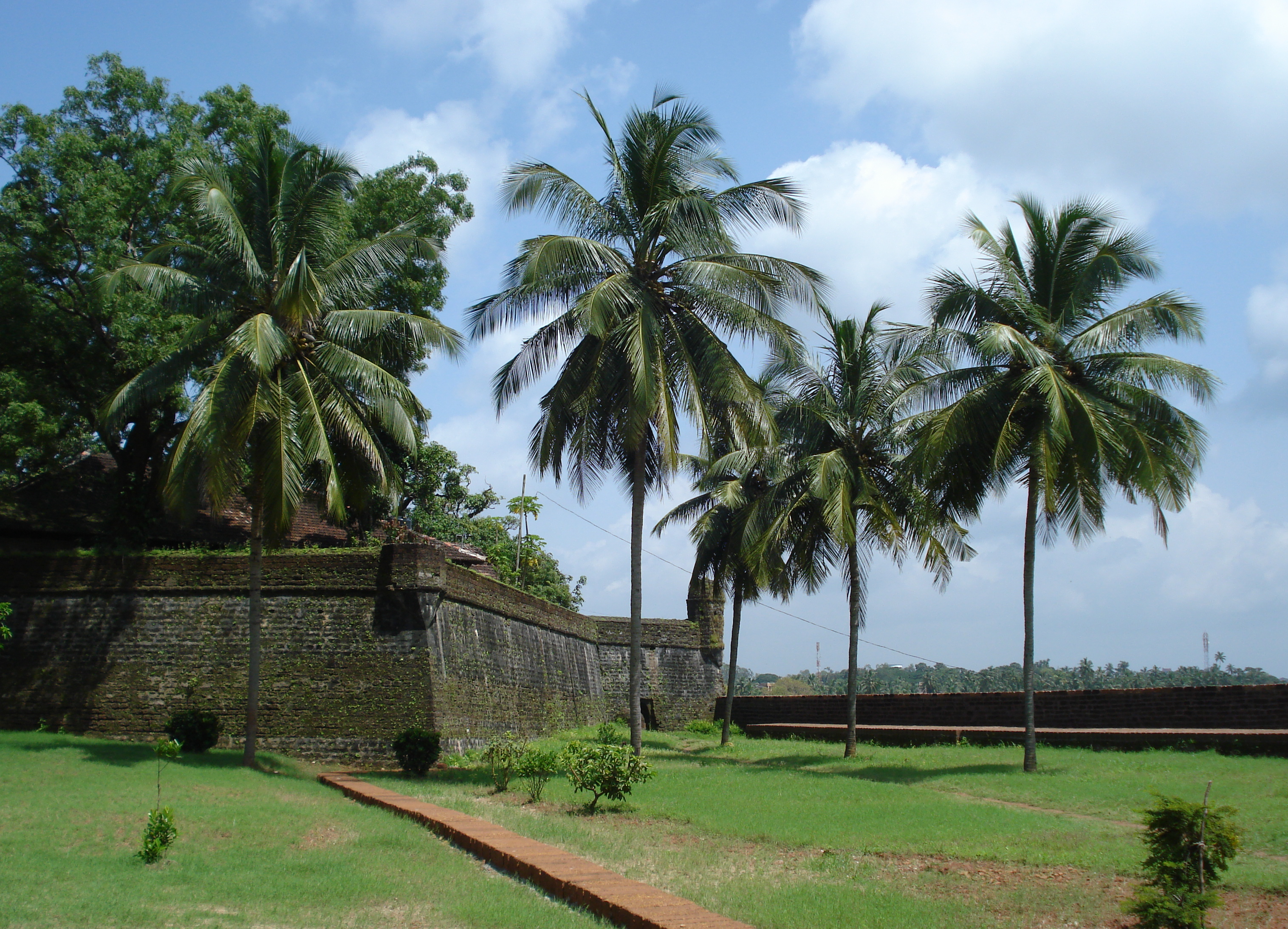
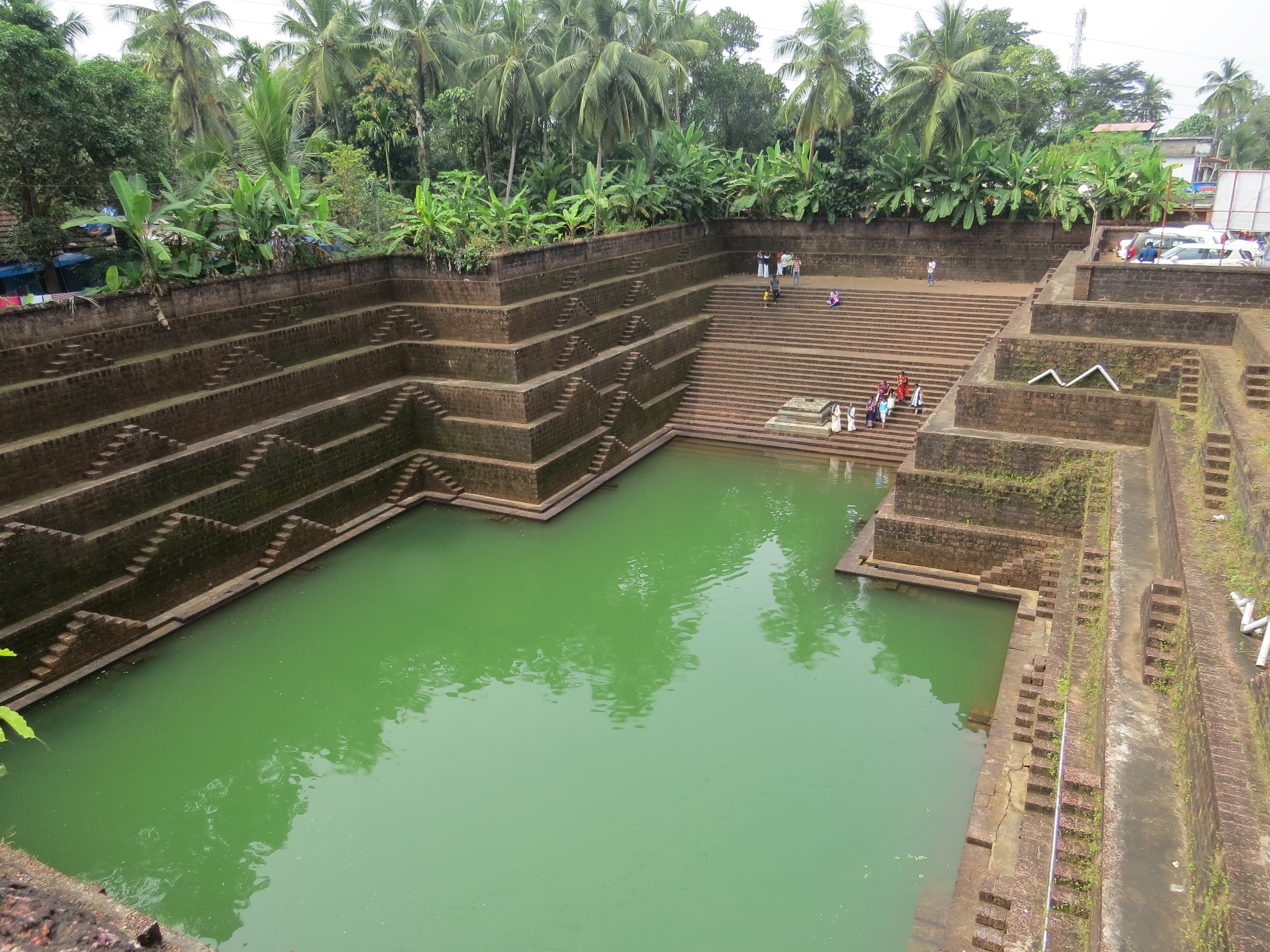
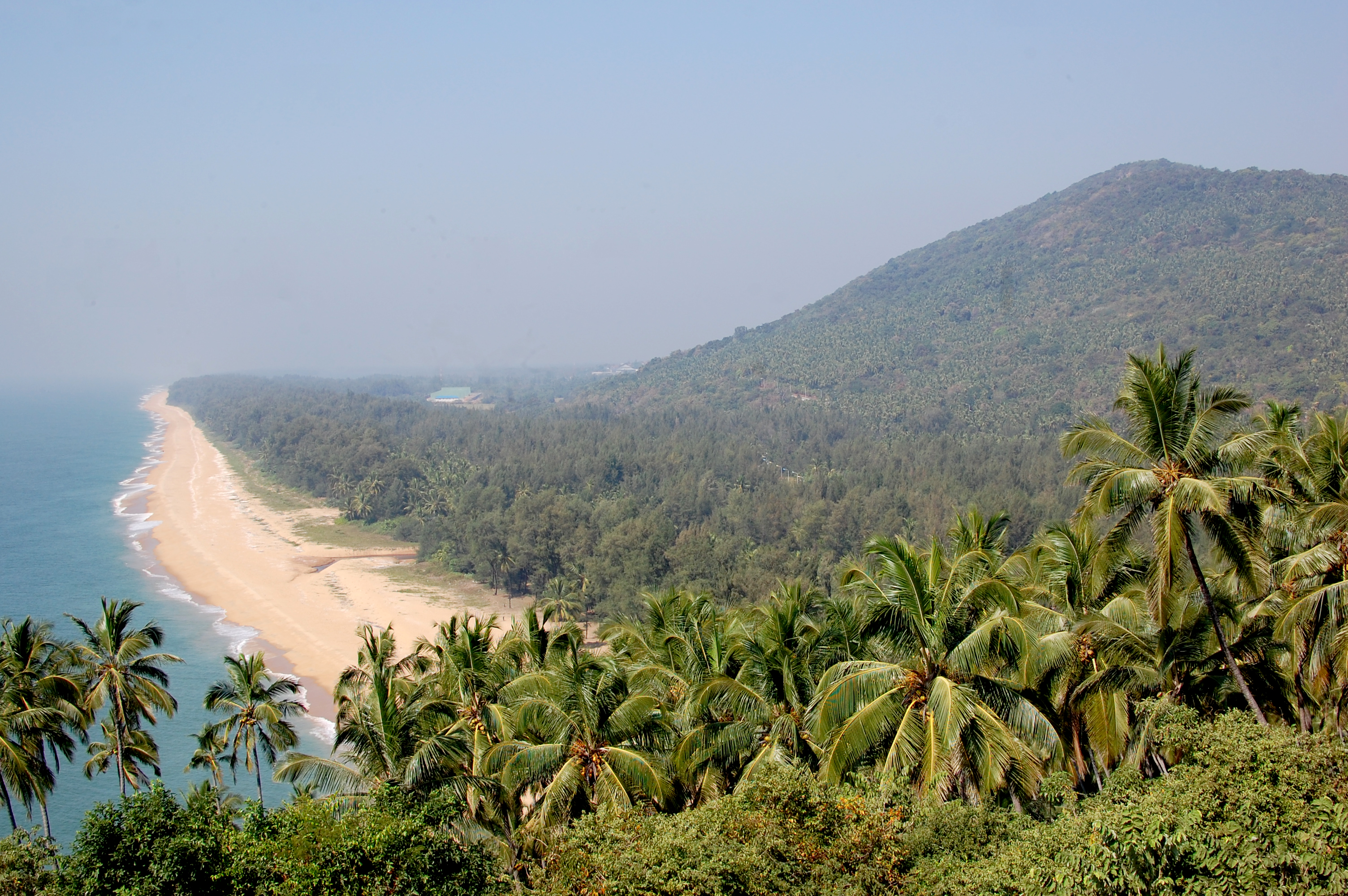
- Kannur skyline Payyambalam Beach Kannur International Airport Gandhi Circle Kuppam Bridge St. Angelo Fort Peralasseri Pond Ezhimala Hill
- Nickname: Land of looms and lores
- Kannur (Kerala) Kannur (India)
- Coordinates: 11°52′28.2″N 75°22′13.4″E
- Country: India
- State: Kerala
- District: Kannur
- Taluk: Kannur

Government
  - Type: Municipal Corporation
  - Body: Kannur Municipal Corporation
  - Mayor: P. Indira (INC)
  - Deputy mayor: K.P. Thahir (IUML)
  - MLAs: T.O Mohanan (Kannur) and K. V. Sumesh (Azhikode)
  - MP: K. Sudhakaran (INC)
  - Commissioner of Police: B.V. Vijaya Bharath Reddy IPS

Area
  - City: 78.35 km^{2} (30.25 sq mi)
  - Metro: 1,003 km^{2} (387 sq mi)
  - Rank: 5
- Elevation: 38.78 m (127.2 ft)

Population (2011)
  - City: 232,486
  - Rank: 6
  - Density: 2,967/km^{2} (7,685/sq mi)
  - Metro: 2,465,000
- Demonyms: Kannurkaran (Male); Kannurkari (Female); Kannurkar (Plural)

Languages
  - Official: Malayalam, English
- Time zone: UTC+5:30 (IST)
- PIN: 670001
- Telephone code: +91497xxxxxxx
- ISO 3166 code: IN-KL
- Vehicle registration: KL-13
- Sex ratio: 1000:1090 ♂/♀
- Literacy rate: 96.23%
- Lok Sabha constituency: Kannur
- Niyamasabha constituencies: Kannur & Azhikode
- International airport: Kannur International Airport
- Website: www.kannur.nic.in kannurcorporation.lsgkerala.gov.in

Kannur (Malayalam: [kɐɳːuːr]), formerly known in English as Cannanore, is a city and municipal corporation in the state of Kerala, India. It is the administrative headquarters of the Kannur district and situated 280 kilometres (170 mi) north of the major port city and commercial hub Kochi and 146 kilometres (91 mi) south of the major port city and commercial hub, Mangalore. It is the fifth largest city in Kerala. During British colonial rule in India, when Kannur was a part of the Malabar District (Madras Presidency), the city was known as Cannanore. Kannur is the fifth largest urban agglomeration in Kerala. As of the 2011 census, Kannur Municipal Corporation, the local body which administers mainland area of city, had a population of 232,486.

Kannur was the headquarters of Kolathunadu, one of the four most important dynasties on the Malabar Coast, along with the Zamorin of Calicut, Kingdom of Cochin and Kingdom of Quilon. The Arakkal kingdom had right over the city of Kannur and Laccadive Islands in the late medieval period. Kannur municipality was formed on 1 November 1866 by the Madras Act 10 of 1865 (Amendment of the Improvements in Towns Act 1850) of the British Indian Empire, along with the municipalities of Thalassery, Kozhikode, Palakkad and Fort Kochi, making them the first modern municipalities in the state. It was upgraded to a municipal corporation in 2015.

Kannur Cantonment is the only cantonment board in Kerala. The Indian Naval Academy at Ezhimala is Asia's largest, and the world's third-largest, naval academy. Muzhappilangad beach is the longest drive-in beach in Asia and appeared among the top six best beaches for driving in the world in a BBC Top Gear article. During British rule, Kannur's chief importance laid in producing Thalassery pepper.

== History ==
Names, routes and locations of the Periplus of the Erythraean Sea (1st century CE)

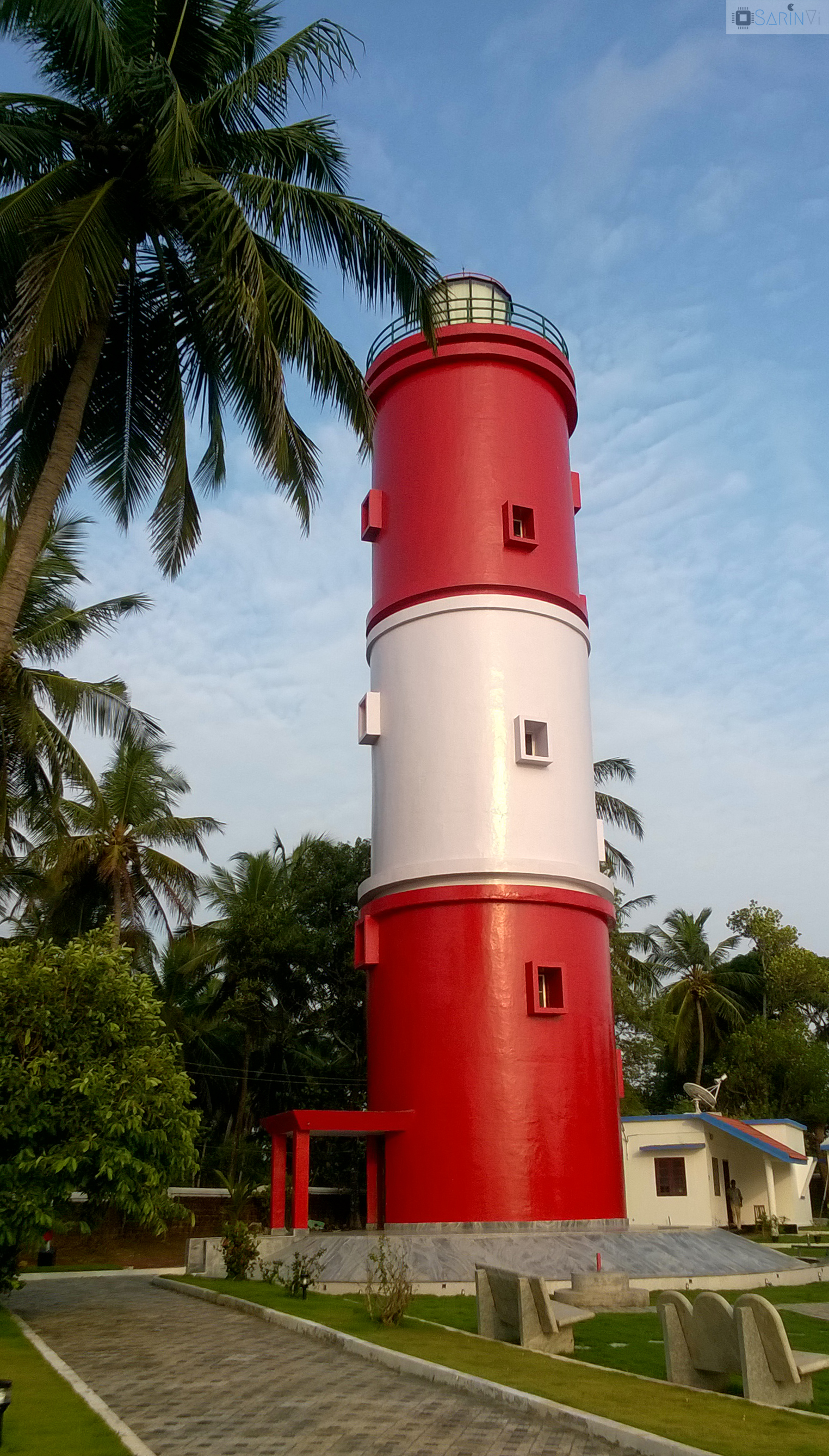
Kannur Lighthouse

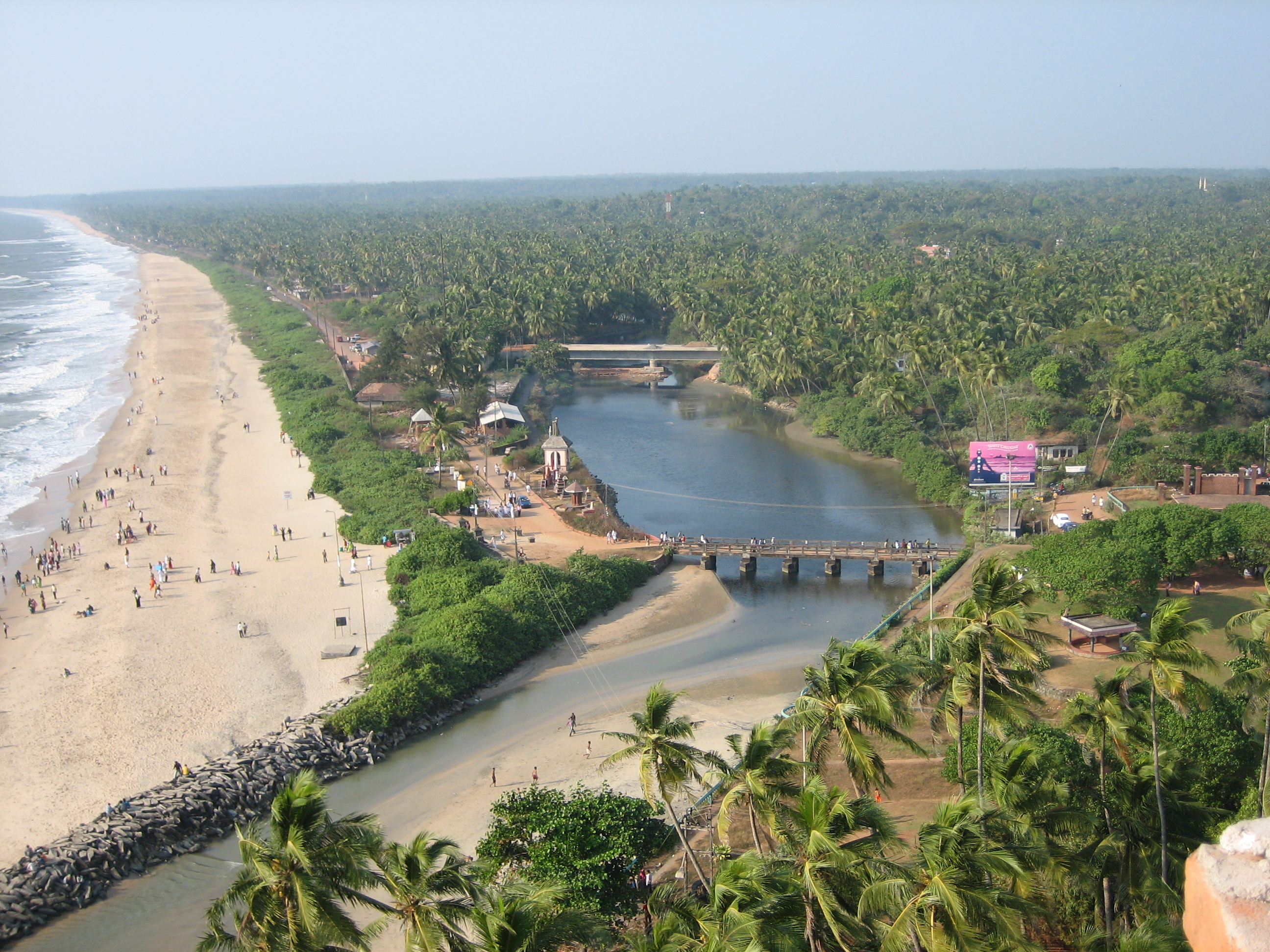
Payyambalam beach

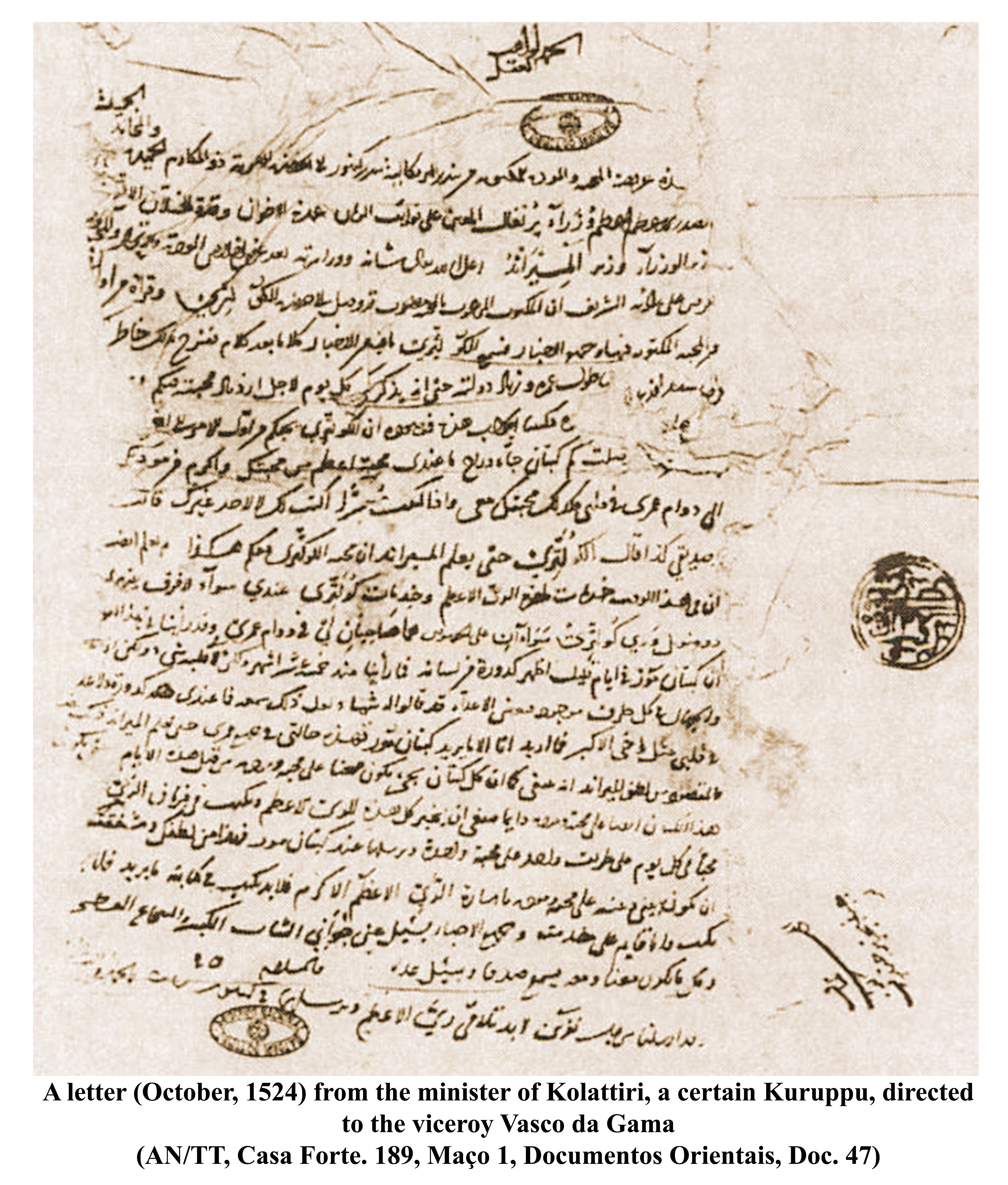
Kolathiri Raja's ( The Ruler Of Kannur ) Minister Kuruppu's Arabic Letter To Vasco da Gama (1524)

=== Pre-history and Ancient era ===
The earliest evidence of human habitation in the region are rock-cut caves and megalithic burial sites of the Neolithic age. The Taliparamba-Kannur-Thalassery area abounds in rock-cut caves, dolmens, burial stone circles and menhirs, all of megalith. Kannur District was the seat of powerful kingdom based at Ezhimala in the Sangam period (1st–5th century CE). The ancient port of Naura, which is mentioned in the Periplus of the Erythraean Sea as a port somewhere north of Muziris is identified with Kannur. Pliny the Elder (1st century CE) states that the port of Tyndis was located at the northwestern border of Keprobotos (Chera dynasty). The region, which lies north of the port at Tyndis, was ruled by the kingdom of Ezhimala during the Sangam period.

According to the Periplus of the Erythraean Sea, a region known as Limyrike began at Naura and Tyndis. However the Ptolemy mentions only Tyndis as the Limyrike's starting point. The region probably ended at Kanyakumari; it thus roughly corresponds to the present-day Malabar Coast. The value of Rome's annual trade with the region was estimated at 50,000,000 sesterces. Pliny the Elder mentioned that Limyrike was prone by pirates. The Cosmas Indicopleustes mentioned that the Limyrike was a source of peppers.

The kingdom of Ezhimala had jurisdiction over two Nadus – The coastal Poozhinadu and the hilly eastern Karkanadu. According to the works of Sangam literature, Poozhinadu consisted much of the coastal belt between Mangalore and Kozhikode. Karkanadu consisted of Wayanad-Gudalur hilly region with parts of Kodagu (Coorg). It is said that Nannan, the most renowned ruler of Ezhimala dynasty, took refuge at Wayanad hills in the 5th century CE when he was lost to Cheras, just before his execution in a battle, according to the Sangam works.

=== Early Middle Ages ===
According to Kerala Muslim tradition, Kannur along with surrounding Madayi and Dharmadom were home to three of the oldest mosques in the Indian subcontinent. According to the Legend of Cheraman Perumals, the first Indian mosque was built in 624 AD at Kodungallur with the mandate of the last ruler (the Cheraman Perumal) of Chera dynasty, who left from Dharmadom to Mecca and converted to Islam during the lifetime of Muhammad (c. 570–632). According to Qissat Shakarwati Farmad, the Masjids at Kodungallur, Kollam, Madayi, Barkur, Mangalore, Kasaragod, Kannur, Dharmadam, Panthalayani, and Chaliyam, were built during the era of Malik Dinar, and they are among the oldest Masjids in the Indian subcontinent. It is believed that Malik Dinar died at Thalangara in Kasaragod town.

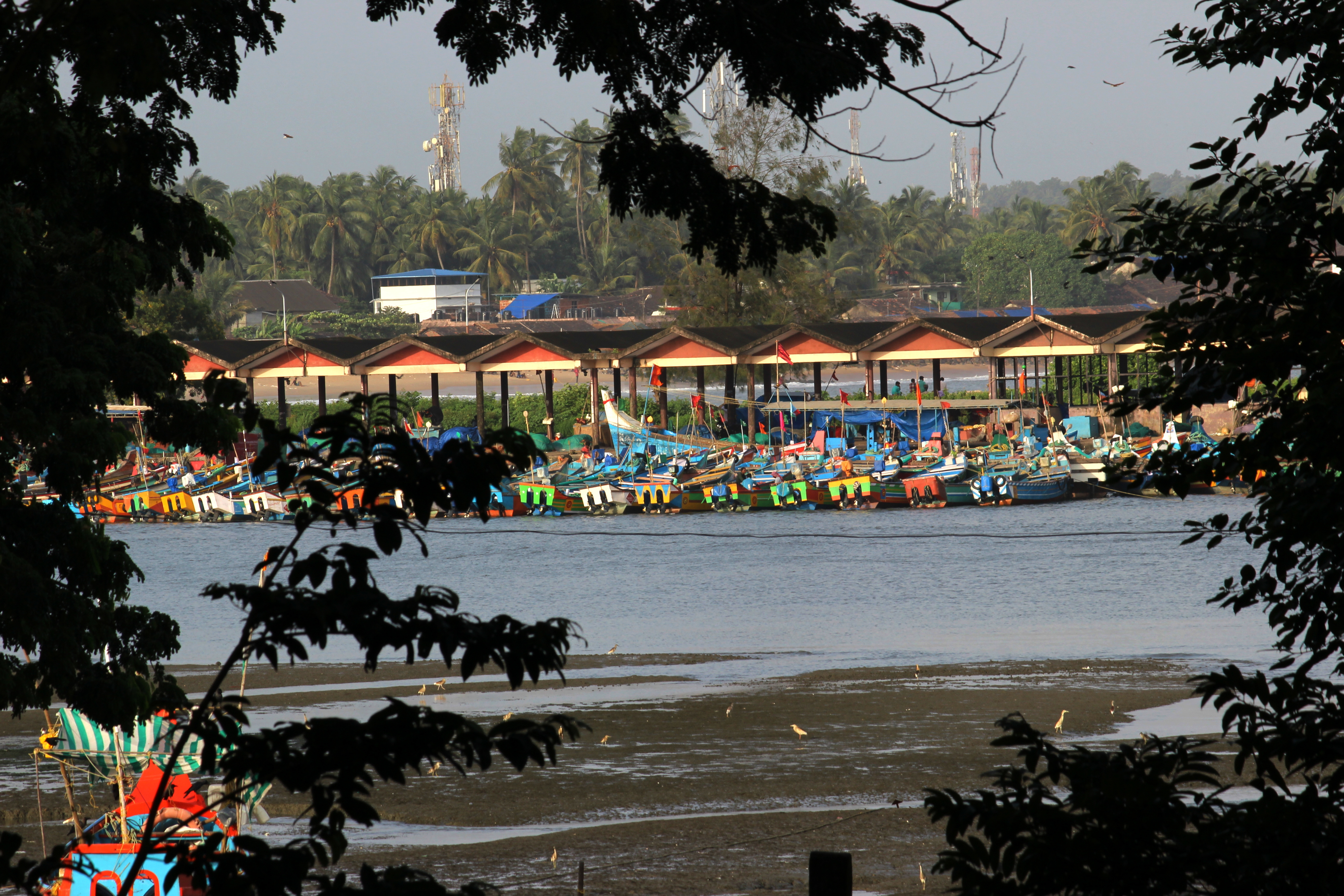
Mappila Bay harbour at Ayikkara. On one side, there is St. Angelo Fort (built in 1505) and on the other side is Arakkal palace.

Ezhimala kingdom was succeeded by Mushika dynasty in the early medieval period, most possibly due to the migration of Tuluva Brahmins from Tulu Nadu. The Mushika-vamsha Mahakavya, written by Athula in the 11th century, throws light on the recorded past of the Mushika Royal Family up until that point. The Indian anthropologist Ayinapalli Aiyappan states that a powerful and warlike clan of the Bunt community of Tulu Nadu was called Kola Bari and the Kolathiri Raja of Kolathunadu was a descendant of this clan. The kingdom of Kolathunadu, who were the descendants of Mushika dynasty, at the peak of its power reportedly extended from Netravati River (Mangalore) in the north to Korapuzha (Kozhikode) in the south with Arabian Sea on the west and Kodagu hills on the eastern boundary, also including the isolated islands of Lakshadweep in the Arabian Sea.

An Old Malayalam inscription (Ramanthali inscriptions), dated to 1075 CE, mentioning king Kunda Alupa, the ruler of Alupa dynasty of Mangalore, can be found at Ezhimala near Kannur. The Arabic inscription on a copper slab within the Madayi Mosque in Kannur records its foundation year as 1124 CE. In his book on travels (Il Milione), Marco Polo recounts his visit to the area in the mid 1290s. Other visitors included Faxian, the Buddhist pilgrim and Ibn Batuta, writer and historian of Tangiers. The Kolathunadu in the late medieval period emerged into independent 10 principalities i.e., Kadathanadu (Vadakara), Randathara or Poyanad (Dharmadom), Kottayam (Thalassery), Nileshwaram, Iruvazhinadu (Panoor, Kurumbranad etc., under separate royal chieftains due to the outcome of internal dissensions. The Nileshwaram dynasty on the northernmost part of Kolathiri dominion, were relatives to both Kolathunadu as well as the Zamorin of Calicut, in the early medieval period.

Kannur was an important trading center in the 12th century, with active business connections with Persia and Arabia. The port at Kozhikode held the superior economic and political position in medieval Kerala coast, while Kannur, Kollam, and Kochi, were commercially important secondary ports, where the traders from various parts of the world would gather.

=== Era of European influences ===
Kannur served as the East India Company military headquarters on India's west coast until 1887. The modern town is referred to as Kannur Town. Kannur, as a district and surrounding areas, were mostly ruled by the famous Kolathiri Rajas. When the state of Kerala was formed the district took the name Kannur since the administrative offices were established here. Before that, Kannur was the headquarters of Chirakkal taluk of Malabar District in the Madras Presidency. During the period of Company rule in India, the East India Company preferred Madras and Cochin as their major stations and Kannur started to lose its old glory. The people of Kannur are still waiting for their old glory to get back and they feel they are being sidelined because the state administration is located the exact opposite side of the state. Part of the original city of Kannur was under Kerala's only Muslim Royalty called the Arakkal and this area is still known as city.

The Portuguese explorer Vasco da Gama arrived at Kappad Kozhikode in 1498 during the Age of Discovery, thus opening a direct sea route from Europe to South Asia. In 1501 a Portuguese factory was planted here by Pedro Álvares Cabral, and in 1502 da Gama made a treaty with the Raja. The St. Angelo Fort at Kannur was built in 1505 by Dom Francisco de Almeida, the first Portuguese Viceroy of India. The Dutch captured the fort from the Portuguese in 1663. They modernised the fort and built the bastions Hollandia, Zeelandia, and Frieslandia that are the major features of the present structure. The original Portuguese fort was pulled down later. A painting of this fort and the fishing ferry behind it can be seen in the Rijksmuseum Amsterdam. The Dutch sold the fort to king Ali Raja of Arakkal in 1772.

During the 17th century, Kannur was the capital city of the only Muslim Sultanate in Kerala, known as Arakkal, who also ruled the Laccadive Islands in addition to the city of Kannur. Arakkal Kingdom and Chirakkal kingdom were two vassal kingdoms based in the city of Kannur. The island of Dharmadom near Kannur, along with Thalassery, was ceded to the East India Company as early as 1734, which were claimed by all of the Kolattu Rajas, Kottayam Rajas, Mannanar and Arakkal Bibi in the late medieval period, where the British initiated a factory and English settlement following the cession. Then the East India Company captured the fort Kannur in 1790 and used it as one of their major military stations on the Malabar Coast. During the period of British colonial rule, Kannur was part of the Madras province in the Malabar District.

In 1761, the British captured Mahé, and the settlement was handed over to the ruler of Kadathanadu. The British restored Mahé to the French as a part of the 1763 Treaty of Paris. In 1779, the Anglo-French war broke out, resulting in the French loss of Mahé. In 1783, the British agreed to restore to the French their settlements in India, and Mahé was handed over to the French in 1785.

Initially the British had to suffer local resistance against their rule under the leadership of Kerala Varma Pazhassi Raja, who had popular support in Thalassery-Wayanad region. The guerrilla war launched by Pazhassi Raja, the ruler of Kottayam province, against the East India Company had a huge impact on the history of Kannur. Changes in the socio-economic and political sectors in Kerala during the initial decades of the 20th century created conditions congenial for the growth of the Communist Party. Extension of English education initiated by Christian missionaries in 1906 and later carried forward by government, rebellion for wearing a cloth to cover upper parts of body, installing an idol at Aruvippuram in 1888, Malayali Memorial in 1891, establishment of SNDP Yogam in 1903, activities, struggles etc. became factors helpful to accelerate changes in Kerala society during a short time. These movements eventually coalesced into the Indian independence movement.

Very soon, ideas about socialism and Soviet Revolution reached Kerala. Such ideas got propagated in Kerala through the works of Swadeshabhimani Ramakrishna Pillai, Sahodaran Ayyappan, P. Kesavadev and others. By the beginning of the 1930s, some other useful developments were taking place. Important among them was Nivarthana Agitation in Travancore. That was the demand of people suppressed so far as untouchables and weaker sections for participation in government. This brought to the forefront struggles like proportional representation in government and reservation of jobs. This imparted a new enthusiasm among oppressed masses.

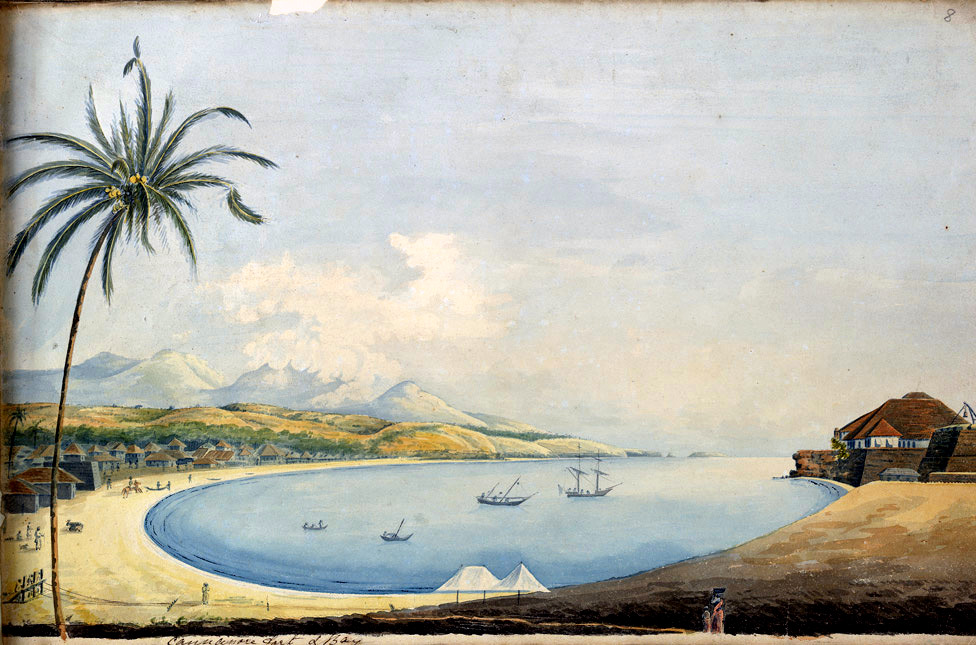
Cannonore fort & Bay'; a watercolor by John Johnston, c.1795-1801

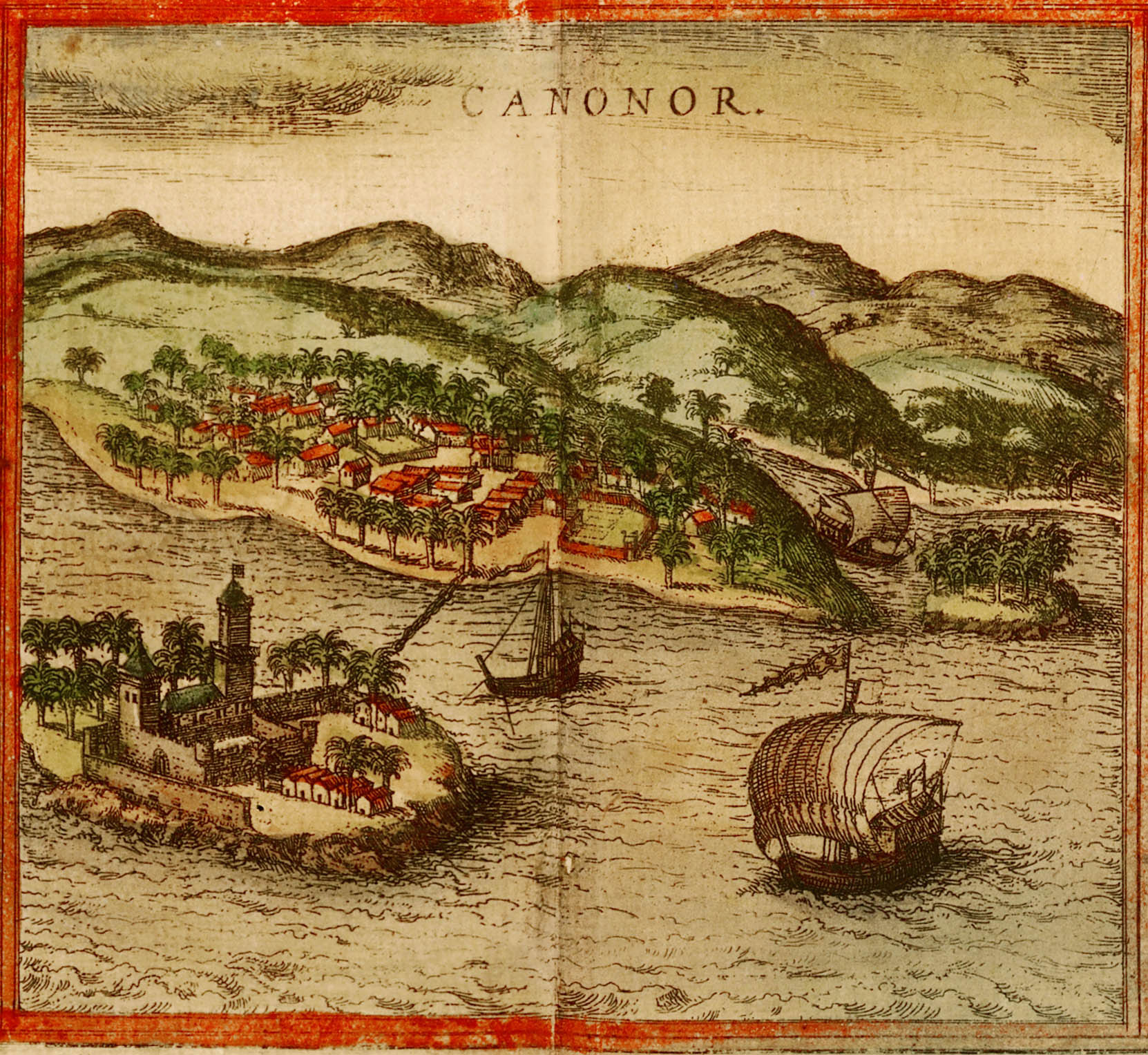
A portrait of Kannur drawn in 1572, from Georg Braun and Frans Hogenberg's atlas Civitates orbis terrarum, Volume I

== Geography ==
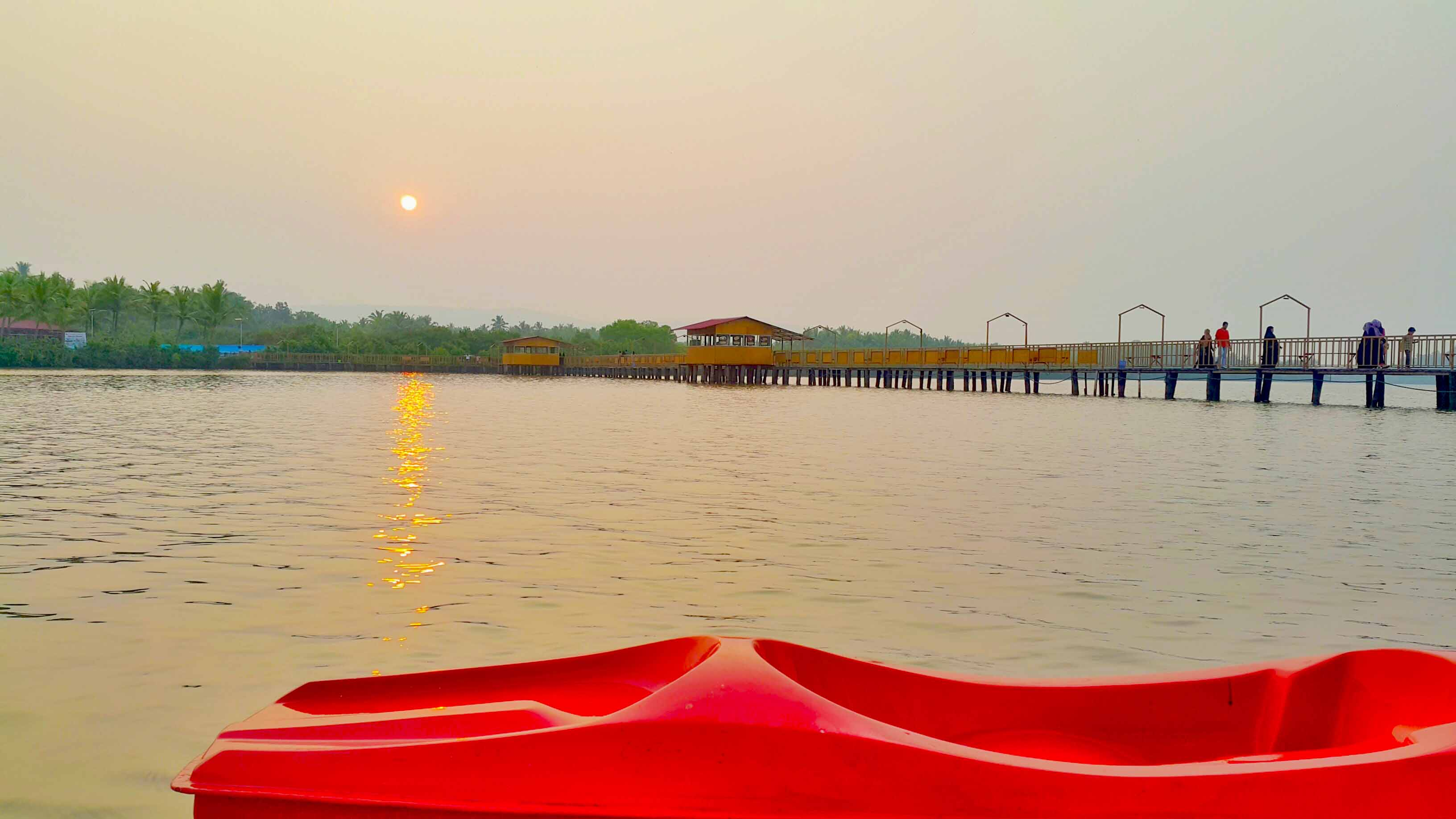
Vayalapra Lake near Madayi

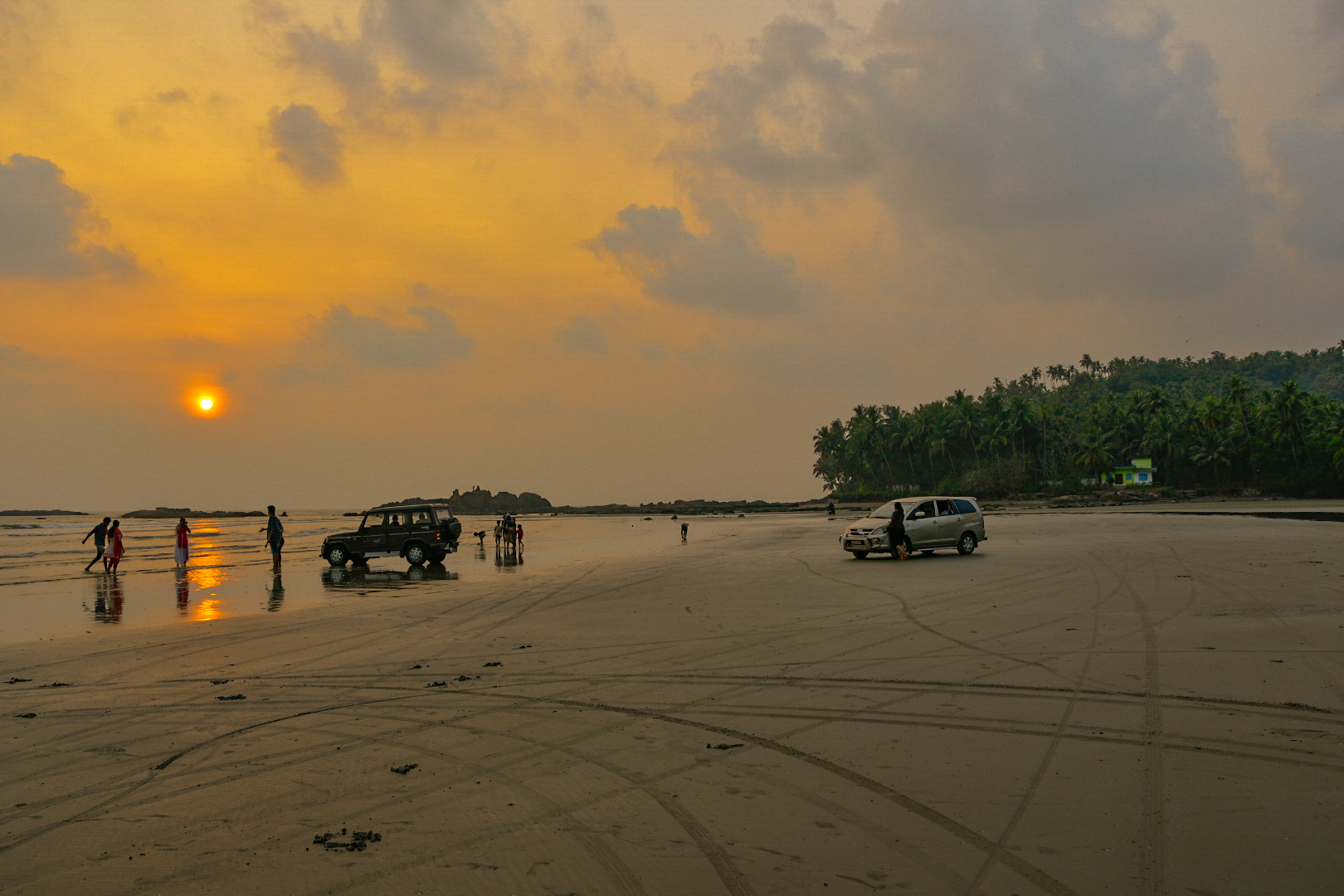
Muzhappilangad Beach, the longest Drive-in Beach in Asia, is located in Kannur

Kannur has an elevation of 1.02 metres or 3.3 feet along the coast of the Laccadive Sea, with a sandy coastal area. The city has an 8 kilometres (5.0 miles)-long seashore and a 3 kilometres (1.9 miles)-long beach at Payyambalam. Kannur is located north of Kozhikode, south of Kasargod and Mangalore, west of the Western Ghat regions of Kodagu and Wayanad, and east of the Laccadive Sea. Mappila Bay harbour at Ayikkara. On one side, there is St. Angelo Fort (built in 1505) and on the other side is Arakkal palace. Muzhappilangad Beach, the longest Drive-in Beach in Asia, is located in Kannur. Vayalapra Lake is near Madayi.

=== Climate ===
Kannur experiences a very wet tropical monsoon climate (Am under the Köppen climate classification.) In the months of April and May, the average daily maximum temperature is about 35 °C (95 °F). Temperatures are moderate in December and January: about 24 °C or 75.2 °F. Like other areas on the Malabar Coast, this city receives heavy rainfall during the Southwest monsoon. The annual average rainfall is 3,438 millimetres or 135 inches, around 68 per cent of which is received in summer.

Climate data for Kannur (1991–2020, extremes 1978–present)
Month	Jan	Feb	Mar	Apr	May	Jun	Jul	Aug	Sep	Oct	Nov	Dec	Year
Record high °C (°F)	36.8 (98.2)	39.0 (102.2)	39.1 (102.4)	39.2 (102.6)	39.1 (102.4)	36.8 (98.2)	33.9 (93.0)	33.6 (92.5)	34.2 (93.6)	35.7 (96.3)	37.0 (98.6)	36.8 (98.2)	39.2 (102.6)
Mean daily maximum °C (°F)	33.6 (92.5)	34.3 (93.7)	34.9 (94.8)	35.0 (95.0)	34.0 (93.2)	30.6 (87.1)	29.5 (85.1)	29.8 (85.6)	30.8 (87.4)	31.6 (88.9)	32.8 (91.0)	33.3 (91.9)	32.5 (90.5)
Mean daily minimum °C (°F)	21.9 (71.4)	22.9 (73.2)	24.7 (76.5)	25.9 (78.6)	25.6 (78.1)	23.9 (75.0)	23.3 (73.9)	23.4 (74.1)	23.7 (74.7)	23.7 (74.7)	23.6 (74.5)	22.4 (72.3)	23.7 (74.7)
Record low °C (°F)	16.4 (61.5)	17.8 (64.0)	19.0 (66.2)	21.7 (71.1)	20.0 (68.0)	20.6 (69.1)	20.4 (68.7)	20.7 (69.3)	20.9 (69.6)	19.4 (66.9)	17.8 (64.0)	16.1 (61.0)	16.1 (61.0)
Average rainfall mm (inches)	0.5 (0.02)	0.7 (0.03)	15.8 (0.62)	54.2 (2.13)	221.5 (8.72)	946.3 (37.26)	877.2 (34.54)	541.4 (21.31)	270.9 (10.67)	300.4 (11.83)	109.0 (4.29)	27.0 (1.06)	3,364.9 (132.48)
Average rainy days	0.1	0.1	0.6	2.9	7.8	23.5	26.2	21.7	12.3	11.9	4.9	1.1	113.1
Average relative humidity (%) (at 17:30 IST)	63	64	65	66	71	84	87	85	81	79	74	66	74
Source: India Meteorological Department

== Civic administration ==
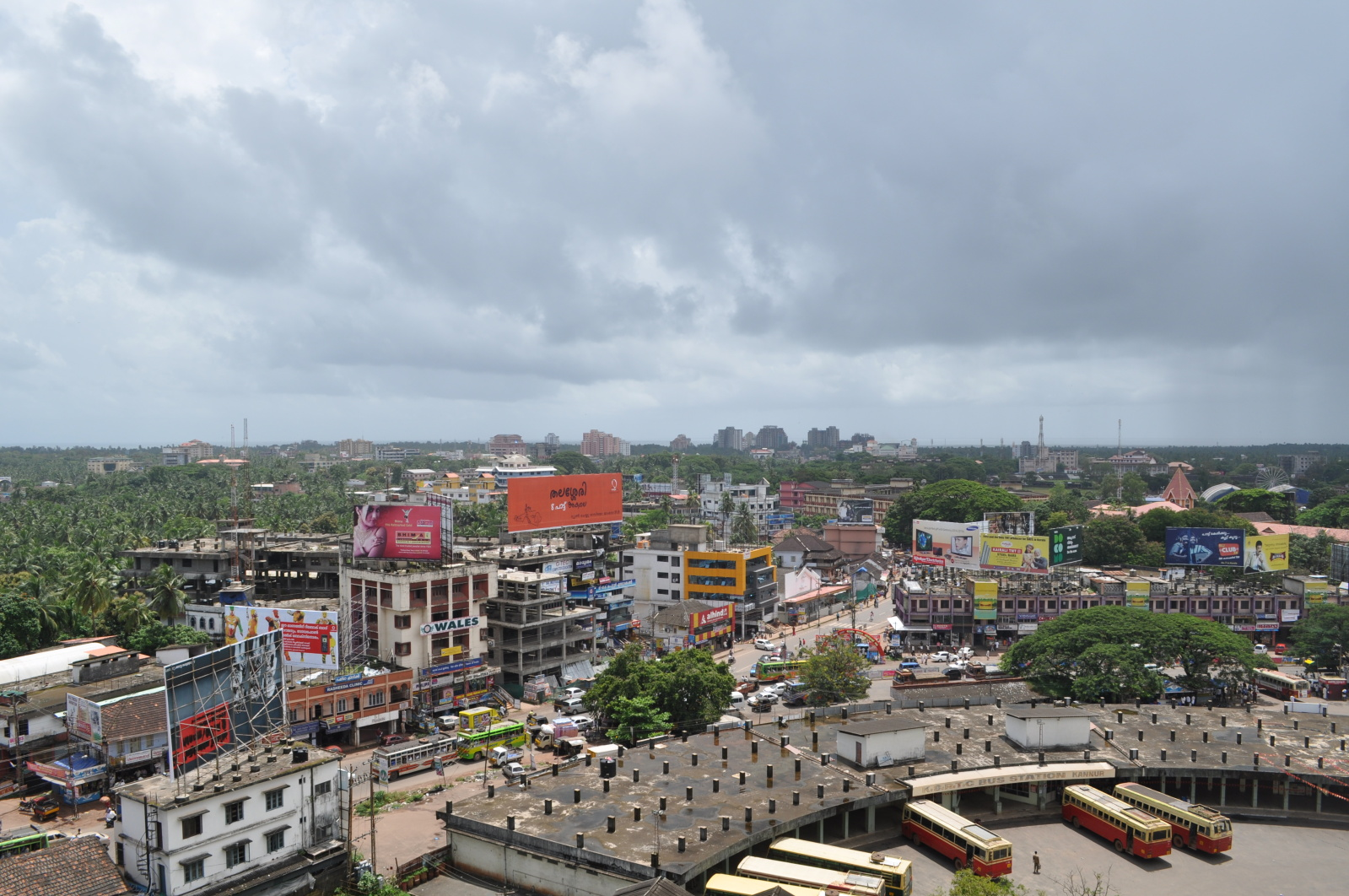
Skyline of Kannur city

Kannur municipality was formed on 1 November 1866 according to the Madras Act 10 of 1865 (Amendment of the Improvements in Towns act 1850) of the British Indian Empire, along with the municipalities of Thalassery, Kozhikode, Palakkad, and Fort Kochi, making them the first modern municipalities in the state. It was upgraded into a Municipal Corporation in the year 2015.

The city is administered by the Kannur Municipal Corporation, headed by a mayor. The corporation is headed by a Mayor and council, and manages 78.35 km^{2} of Kannur city, with a population of about 232,486 within that area. For administrative purposes, the city is divided into 55 divisions, from which the members of the corporation council are elected for five years. Kannur Municipal Corporation is divided into six zones: Kannur town, Pallikunnu, Puzhathi, Edakkad, Elayavoor, and Chelora.

Kannur Municipal Corporation
Mayor	Adv. P Indira (INC)
Deputy Mayor	K.P. Thahir (IUML)
Corporation Secretary	NIL

Kannur Corporation is the fifth City Corporation in Kerala after the creation of the state. Established in 2015, Kannur Corporation's first mayor was E. P. Latha. Kannur corporation has two assembly constituencies – Kannur and Azhikode – both of which are part of Kannur parliamentary constituency.

=== Kannur Municipal Corporation Election 2025 ===
Kannur Municipal Corporation Election 2025
S.No.	Party name	Party symbol	Number of Councillors
01	UDF		36
02	LDF		15
03	BJP		04
04	SDPI		01

=== Kannur Municipal Corporation Election 2020 ===
Kannur Municipal Corporation Election 2020
S.No.	Party name	Party symbol	Number of Councillors
01	UDF		34
02	LDF		19
03	BJP		01
04	Independents		01

=== Law and order ===
The Kannur City Police is headed by a Police Commissioner, an Indian Police Service (IPS) officer. The Kannur City Police is divided into three police subdivisions; Kannur, Thalassery, and Koothuparamba, each under an assistant commissioner (AC). There are 24 police stations in the Kannur City Police. Apart from regular law and order, the city police comprise the traffic police, bomb squad, dog squad, fingerprint bureau, women's cell, juvenile wing, narcotics cell, riot force, armed reserve camps, district crime records bureau and a women's station.

== Sports ==
Kannur city has two main stadiums. Jawahar Municipal Stadium and Mundayad Indoor Stadium.

Jawahar Municipal Stadium is an outdoor stadium owned by Kannur Municipal Corporation. It has a football ground and an athletic track. The stadium has a capacity of about 30,000 spectators and was renovated in 2024. It is the home ground of Kannur Warriors FC and hosts Super League Kerala matches.

Mundayad Indoor Stadium is located at Mundayad, within the Corporation limits. It was built at a cost of ₹23.5 crore on 16.2 acres of land for the 35th National Games. The stadium can accommodate 3,000 spectators and was built to host basketball and wrestling competitions.

The Kannur Police Ground also known as Kannur Police Maidan is a major open ground in the city centre at Talap. It is owned by Kerala Police and is used for parades, exhibitions, sports tournaments and public meetings.

== Infrastructure ==
=== Roads ===
The Kannur City Road Improvement Project (KCRIP) is implemented by Kerala Road Fund Board (KRFB). Under the project, 11 city roads covering 44 km are proposed to be widened at a cost of ₹738 crore. The main part of the development project covers a twelve-kilometer distance on the national highway, stretching from Manna Junction to Chala Junction via Puthiyatheru, Caltex, Thana, and Chovva. This stretch also experiences the heaviest traffic congestion. The project aims to widen eleven roads and upgrade them to higher standards, including Plaza Junction - JTS Road, the stretch from Kottali to Kannothumchal, the road from Chalad to Kunjipally via Pallikkunnu, and Thayyil - Thekkipeedika Road. The project includes flyovers at South Bazar and Mele Chovva.

The 2026-27 state and municipal budgets allocated funds for major infrastructure projects in the city. This includes ₹20 crore for completing the new corporation headquarters complex and ₹60 crore for developing a four-lane road from Mele Chovva to Kanhirode.

=== Utilities ===
The Kannur Municipal Corporation manages urban waste through treatment plants and landfill remediation. Public wastewater is managed by a 10-lakh-litre sewage treatment plant at Padanapalam. The plant was built under the central government's AMRUT project. An expanded centralized facility is being developed at Marakkarkandy.

A biomining project was launched to clear over 120,000 cubic metres of legacy waste at the Chelora trenching ground, which is six decades old. The cleared land is planned for future sanitation facilities. The clearance work has faced delays due to administrative issues and audits by the anti-corruption bureau.

In the 2026-27 budget, ₹6 crore was allocated for a modern bio-solid waste management system and ₹1 crore for a robotic waste removal system.

== Demographics ==
Religions in Kannur City (2011)

source: Kannur City Census 2011 data
1. Hinduism (56.3%)
2. Islam (37.9%)
3. Christianity (5.00%)
4. Others (0.80%)

According to the 2011 census of India, Kannur city has a population of 232,486. Males constitute 46.2% of the population and females 53.8%. Kannur has an average literacy rate of 96.23%, higher than the national average of 74.04%. Male literacy is 98% and female literacy is 94%. In Kannur, 12% of the population is under six years of age.

The Anglo-Indian community in Kannur live mainly in the Kannur Cantonment of Burnacherry and its surrounding areas of Thillery, No.3 Bazaar and Camp Bazaar. Malayalam is the administrative and local language.

== Education ==
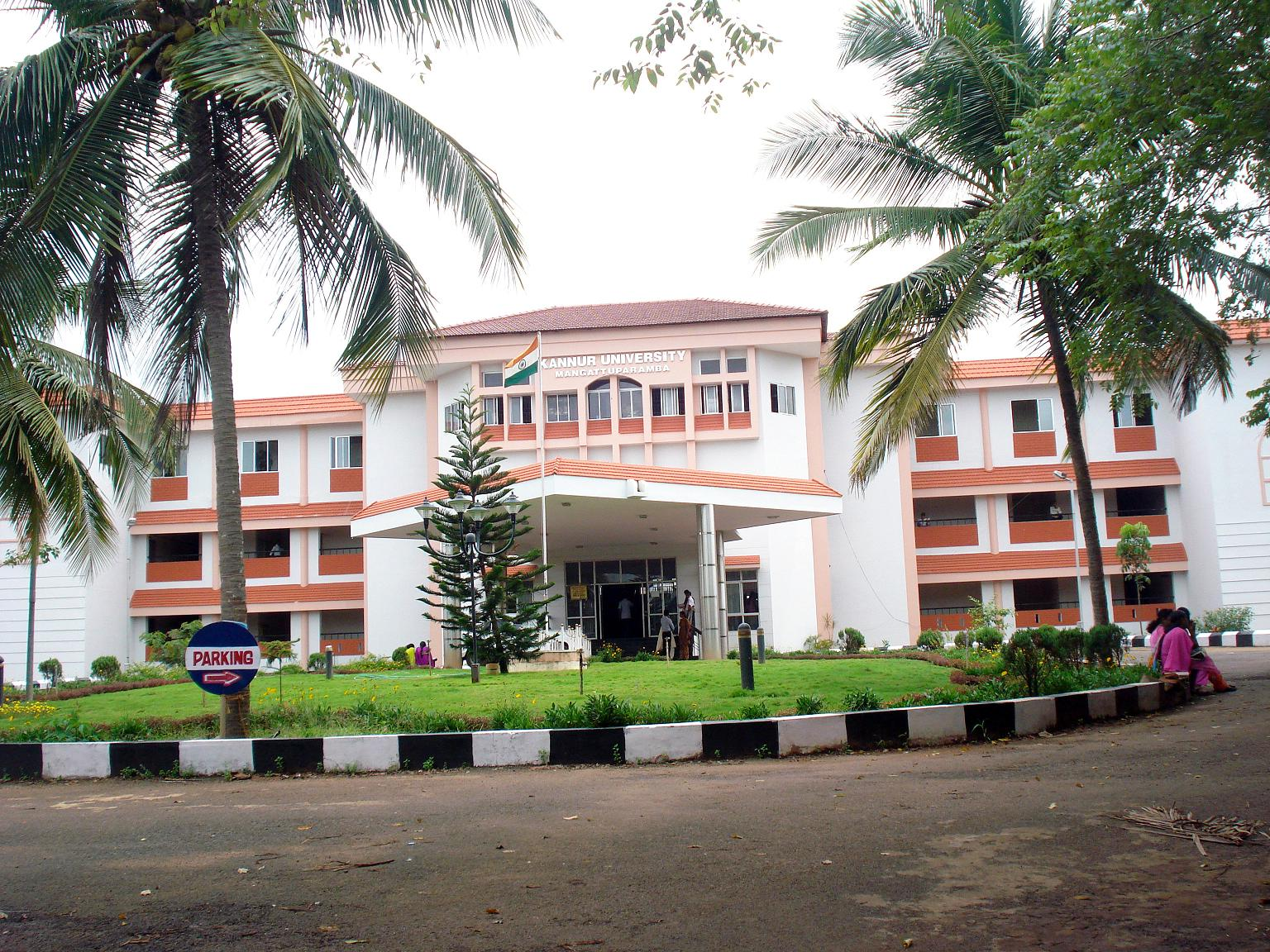
The Kannur University

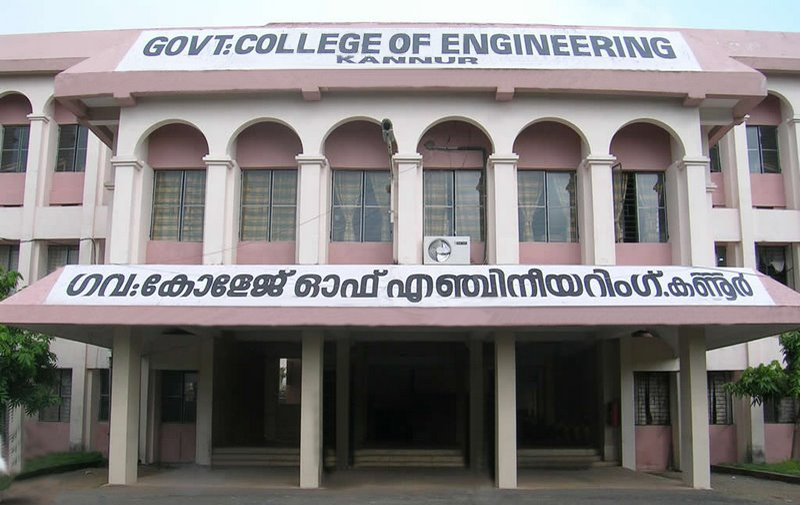
Main block of Government College of Engineering, Kannur

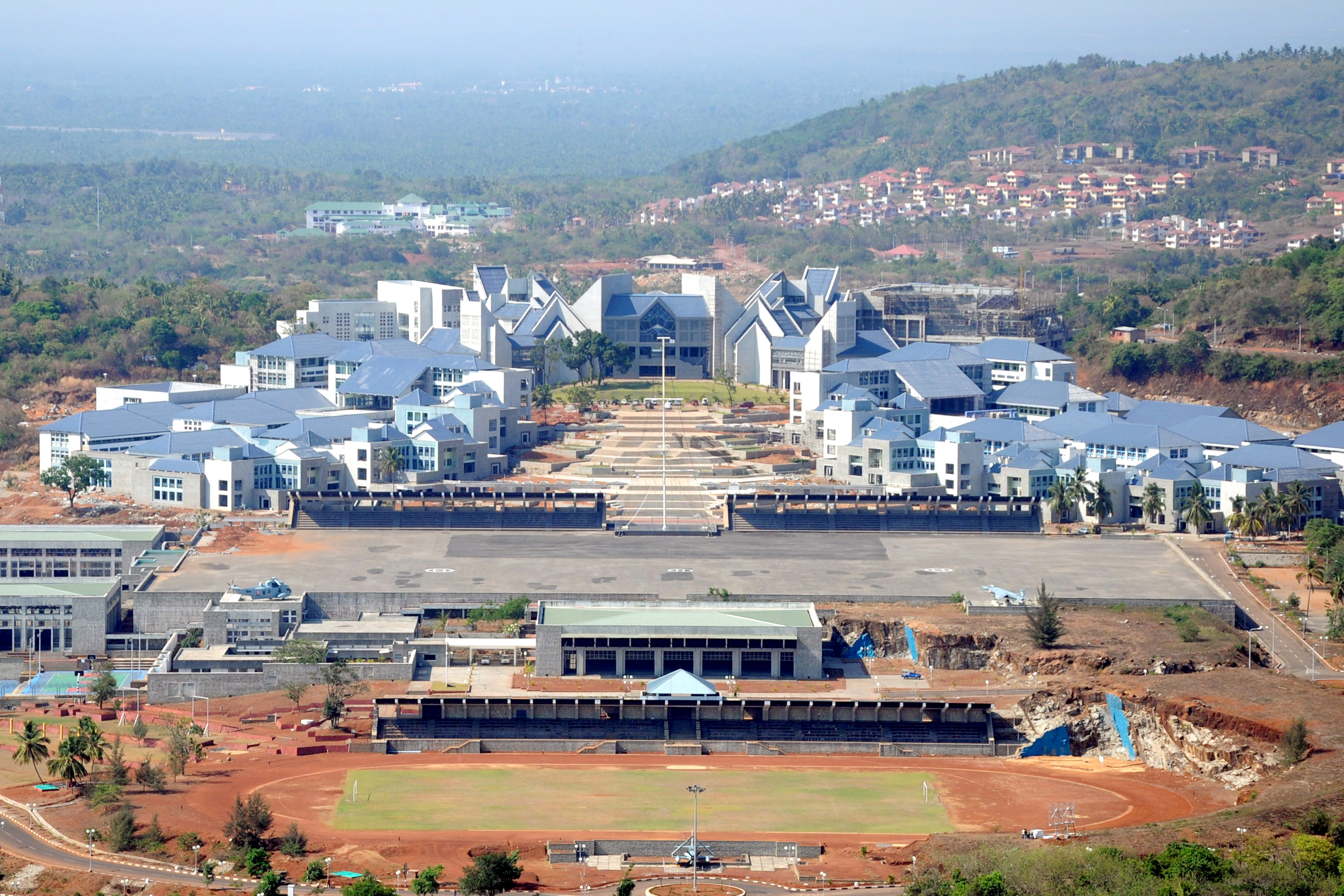
Indian Naval Academy at Ezhimala, Kannur, is the largest naval academy in Asia

Government Medical College, Kannur

Indian Naval Academy is situated in Ezhimala, Kannur. Naval cadets are trained here in 2500 acres vast campus. Kannur District has five Kendriya Vidyalaya at Kannur, Keltron Nagar, Payyanur, Ezhimala, and Thalassery, Peringome.

Kannur University was established by Act 22 of 1996 of the Kerala Legislative Assembly. The university by the name "Malabar University" had come into existence earlier by the promulgation of an ordinance by the governor of Kerala, on 9 November 1995. The university was inaugurated on 2 March 1996 by A. K. Antony, the Chief Minister of Kerala. The objective of the Kannur University Act 1996 was to establish in the state of Kerala a teaching, residential and affiliating university so as to provide for the development of higher education in Kasargod and Kannur revenue districts and the Mananthavady Taluk of Wayanad district. Kannur University is a multi-campus university.

Government Brennen College, the first college in Kannur, established in the year 1862, provide education to more than 2500 students. Government College of Engineering, Kannur was established in 1986 near Dharmasala, Kannur as a center for imparting engineering education in northern Kerala. The college is among the top ten engineering colleges of the state, providing higher studies in the field of technical education.

The Government Medical College, Kannur was established in 1993 at Pariyaram to serve Kannur city and surroundings. The thirteenth National Institute of Fashion Technology (NIFT) Campus is located at Dharmashala, Kannur 16 km (9.9 mi) north of Kannur City.

== Tourism ==
Kannur is a major coastal tourist destination in Malabar coast, known for its historical architecture, beaches and cultural heritage.

=== Historical Architecture ===
- St. Angelo Fort (Kannur Fort): A triangular laterite fort located about 3 km from the city centre, facing the Arabian Sea. Built in 1505 by Dom Francisco de Almeida, the first Portuguese Viceroy of India. It was captured by the Dutch in 1663, sold to the Arakkal Family in 1772 and later seized by the British in 1790. Now protected by the Archaeological Survey of India (ASI), it has old bastions, cannons and views of Mappila Bay and Dharmadam Island.
- Arakkal Museum: A museum located in the former palace (durbar hall) of the Arakkal Kingdom, the only Muslim royal family of Kerala. It displays royal artifacts, documents and furniture related to the Arakkal dynasty. The museum is about 3 km from Kannur city centre.
- Kannur Lighthouse: A lighthouse located near Payyambalam Beach, about 2.5 km from Kannur city centre. It was first built in 1903 and offers views of the Arabian Sea and the surrounding coastline.
- Chirakkal Kovilakam: The former palace of the Chirakkal Rajas, who were the rulers of Kolathunadu. It is one of the oldest royal houses in North Malabar and is located about 6 km from Kannur city. The palace complex includes traditional Kerala architecture and sacred ponds. The Kovilakam also houses Kerala Folklore Academy established in 1995.

=== Beaches ===
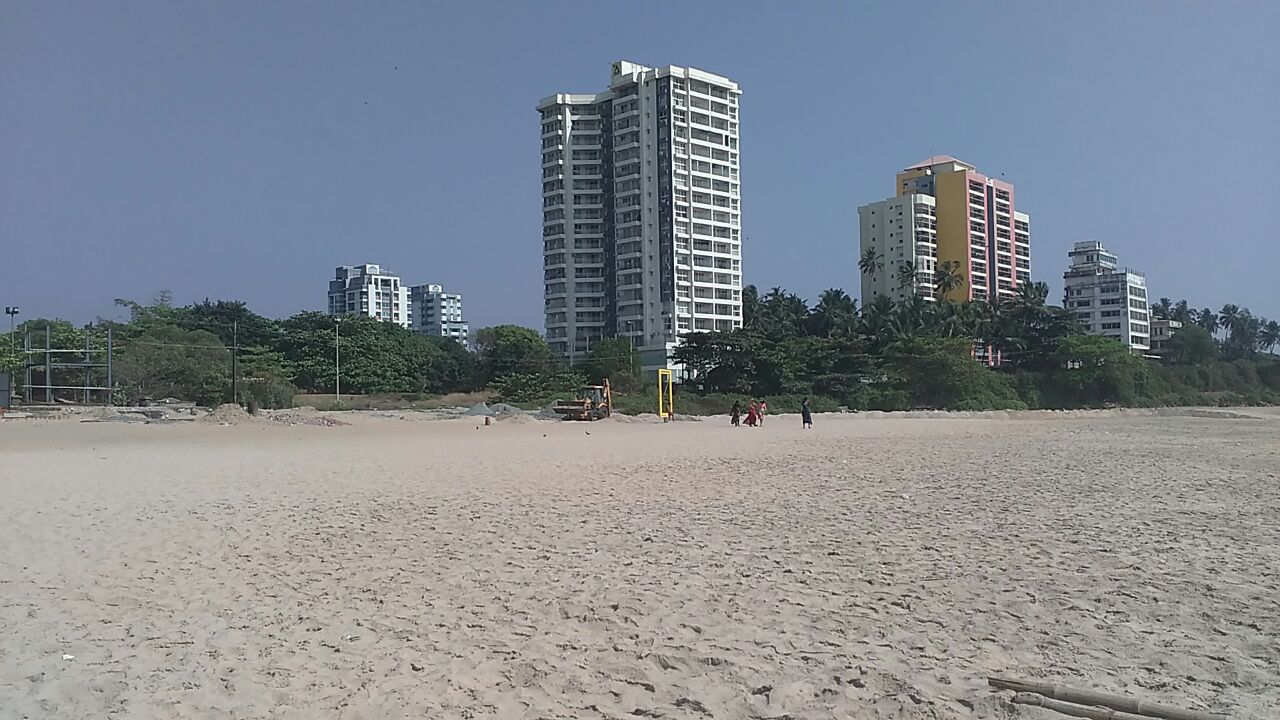
View of Payyambalam Beach

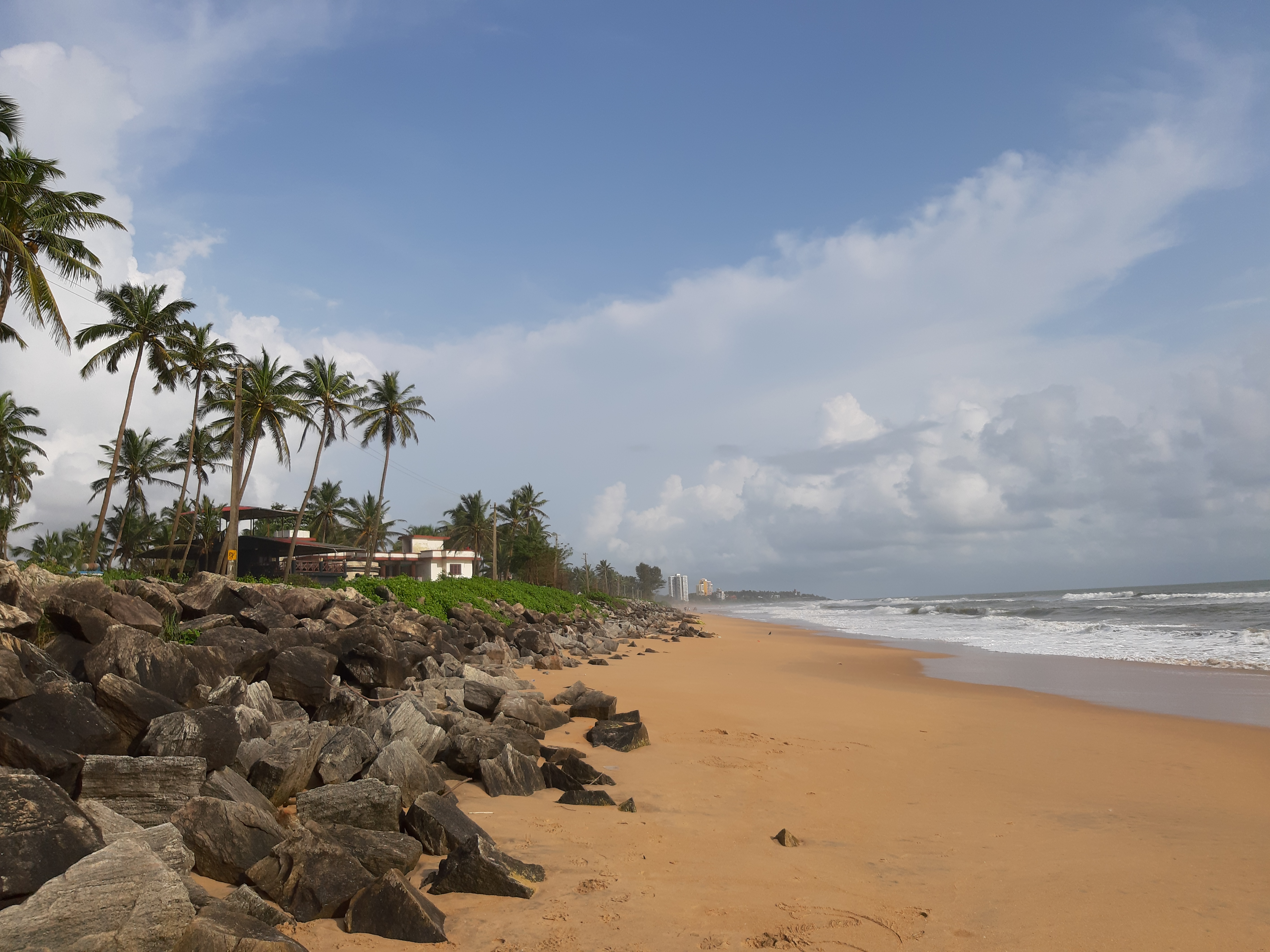
Payyambalam Beach

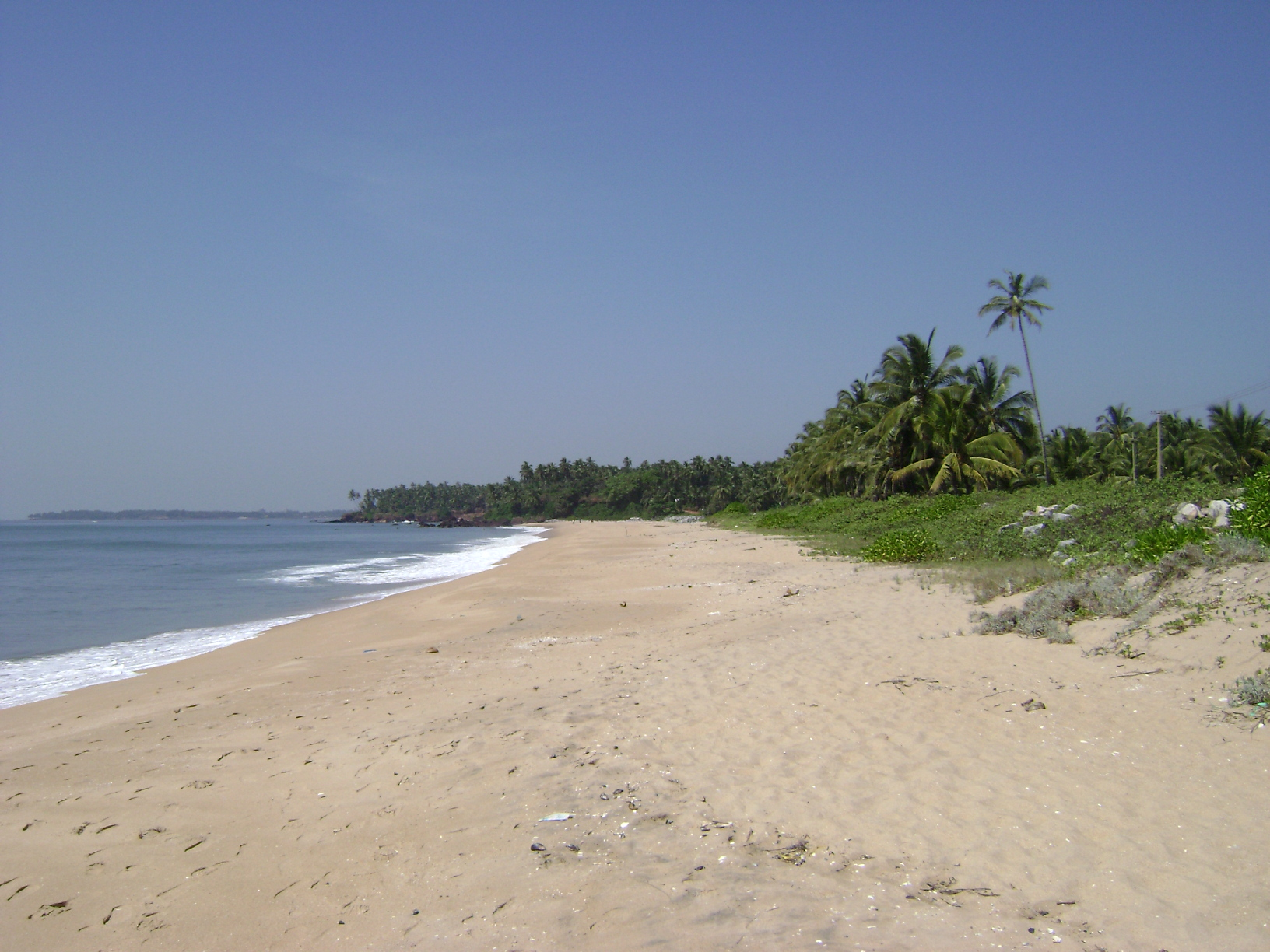
Thottada Beach

- Payyambalam Beach: The main beach of Kannur city, located about 2 km from the centre. It is known for its long coastline, well-maintained garden and the nearby Mother and Child sculpture by Kanayi Kunhiraman.
- Thottada Beach: A beach located about 7 km from Kannur city centre. It is known as a relatively less crowded beach compared to Payyambalam and has a small river (Thottada river) joining the sea nearby.
- Baby Beach: A small, quiet beach near St. Angelo Fort and close to the city centre, mainly used by local people.
- Meenkunnu Beach: Located about 10 km north of the city, known for its relatively clean coastline and views.
- Muzhappilangad Beach: It is located in Muzhappilangad, about 15 km south of the city, and known as Kerala's only drive-in beach where vehicles can drive on the sand.

== Media ==
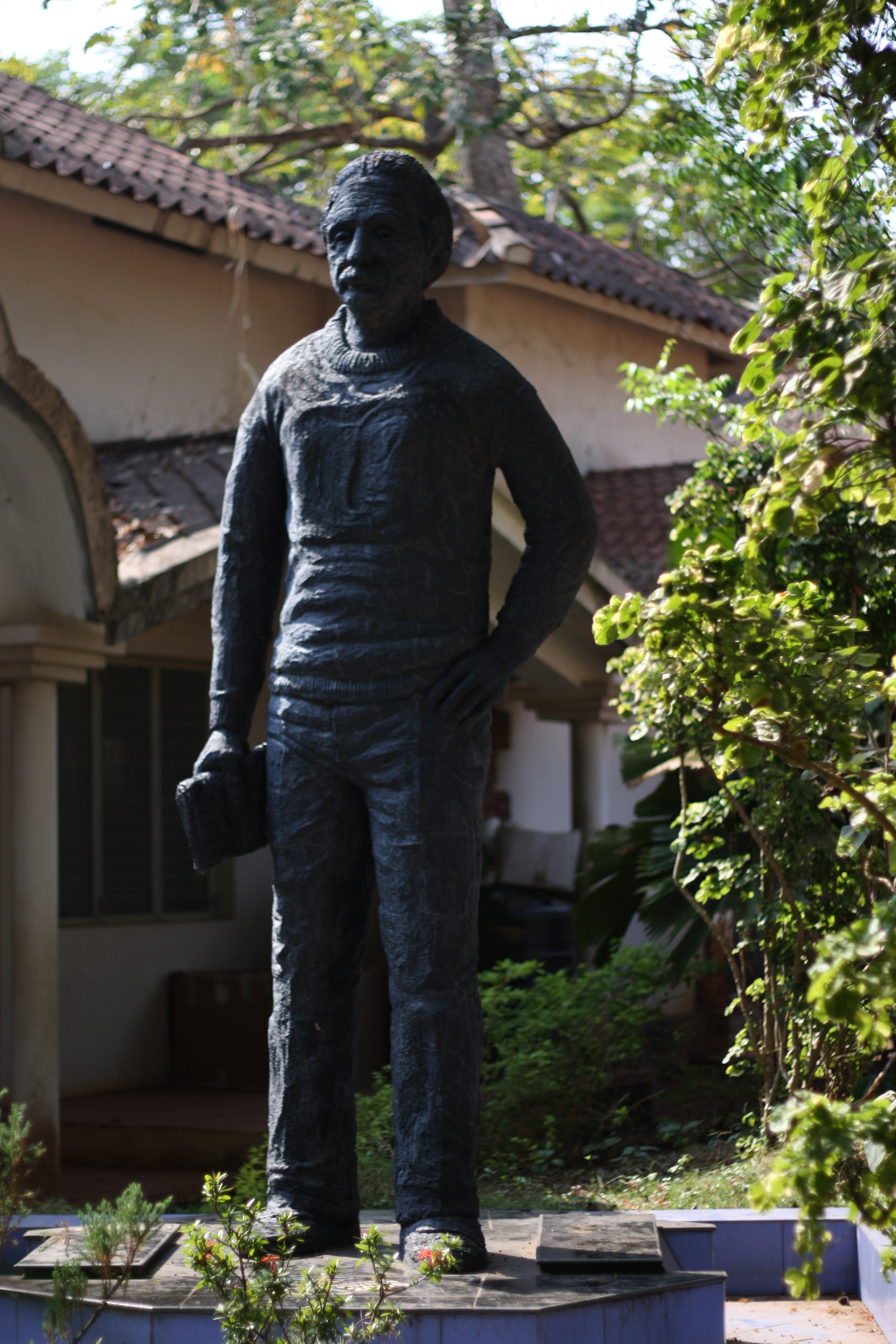
Statue of Albert Einstein at the Science Park, Kannur

Many local cable television channels are available in Kannur. The most popular cable channels are City Channel, City Gold, City Juke, Network Channels, Zeal Network, Kannur Vision, World Vision, Worldvision Music, Chakkarakkal, Gramika channel Koothuparamba and Kannurone.

All India Radio is broadcast in Kannur at 101.5 MHz. Private FM radio stations in Kannur include: Radio Mango 91.9 (Malayala Manorama Co Ltd), Club FM 94.3 (Mathrubhumi Printing And Publishing Co Ltd), Red FM 93.5 (Sun Network) and Best FM 95.0 (Asianet Communications Ltd).

A number of newspapers are published from Kannur, including the Malayala Manorama, Mathrubhumi, Madhyamam, Deshabhimani, Deepika, Rashtra Deepika, Chandrika, Kerala Kaumudi, Mangalam, Janmabhumi, Veekshanam, Thejas, Siraj, Suprabhaatham, Janayugom and The New Indian Express.

== Culture ==
Kannur is known as the "Land of Looms and Lores" for its handloom industry and folk traditions. The culture of the city includes Dravidian traditions, Moplah heritage and colonial influences.

Kerala Folklore Academy, an autonomous centre for cultural affairs constituted by the Government of Kerala situated in Chirakkal, Kannur to promote and project the traditional art forms of Kerala.

=== Performing arts ===
- Theyyam: Kannur district is the main centre for Theyyam, a ritual art form performed from October to May at shrines, ancestral houses (tharavadus) and sacred groves (kavus). Within Kannur city, performances are held at major kavus and temples during the season. Performers wear large headgear (mudi) and heavy makeup.
- Kalaripayattu: Ponnyam, a village near Kannur is known as the birthplace of the northern style of Kalaripayattu (Vadakkan Kalari). Several traditional training centres (kalaris) are located in and around the city.
- Folk traditions: Vadakkan Pattukal (Northern Ballads) are folk songs about local heroes. Poorakkali and Marathukali are traditional art forms performed during temple festivals in the region.

=== Festivals ===
- Kannur Dasara: Kannur Dasara is organised by Kannur Municipal Corporation during Navaratri, a 10-day cultural festival. It is held at venues like Town Square and Collectorate Grounds. The city is decorated with lights, and the festival includes music, dance programmes and commercial exhibitions. Kerala's major festivals such as Onam and Vishu are celebrated widely in the city.

=== Crafts ===
Kannur is known for its handloom industry and was called the "Manchester of Kerala". Handloom weaving is a traditional industry in the city. Apart from the handloom museum in Kannur city, the main handloom production centres in Kannur district are Azhikode, Chirakkal, Kanhirode, Panoor, Kuthuparamba and Kalliasseri.

== Cuisine ==
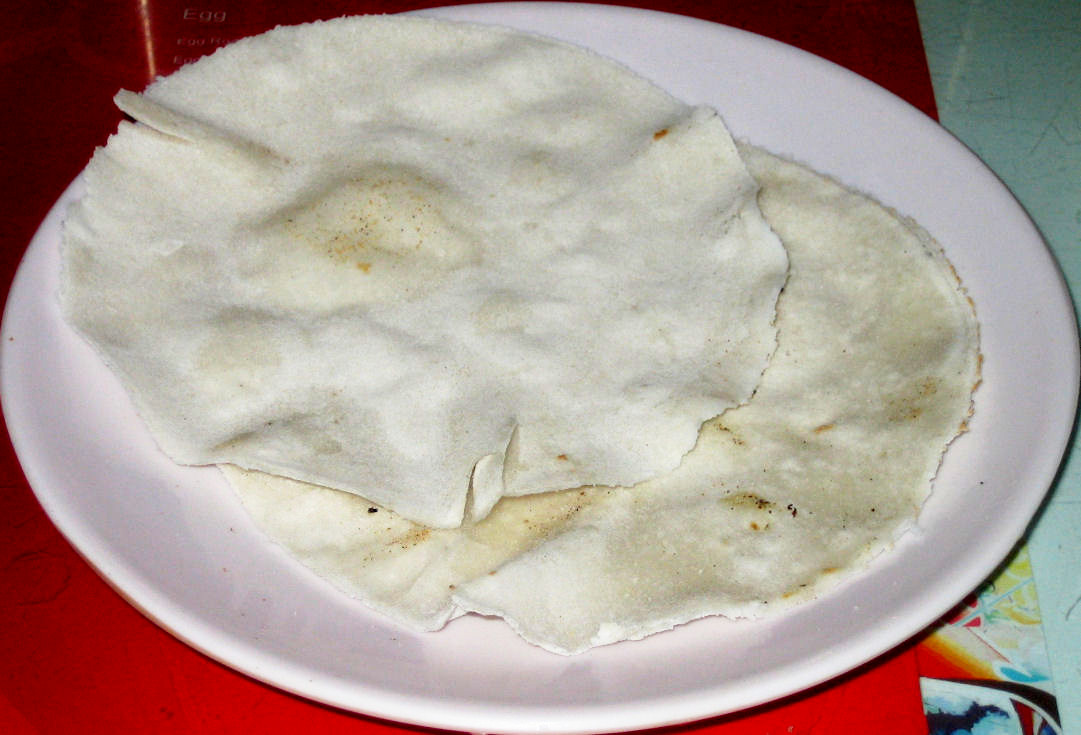
Pathiri, a pancake made of rice flour, is one of the common breakfast dishes in Kannur

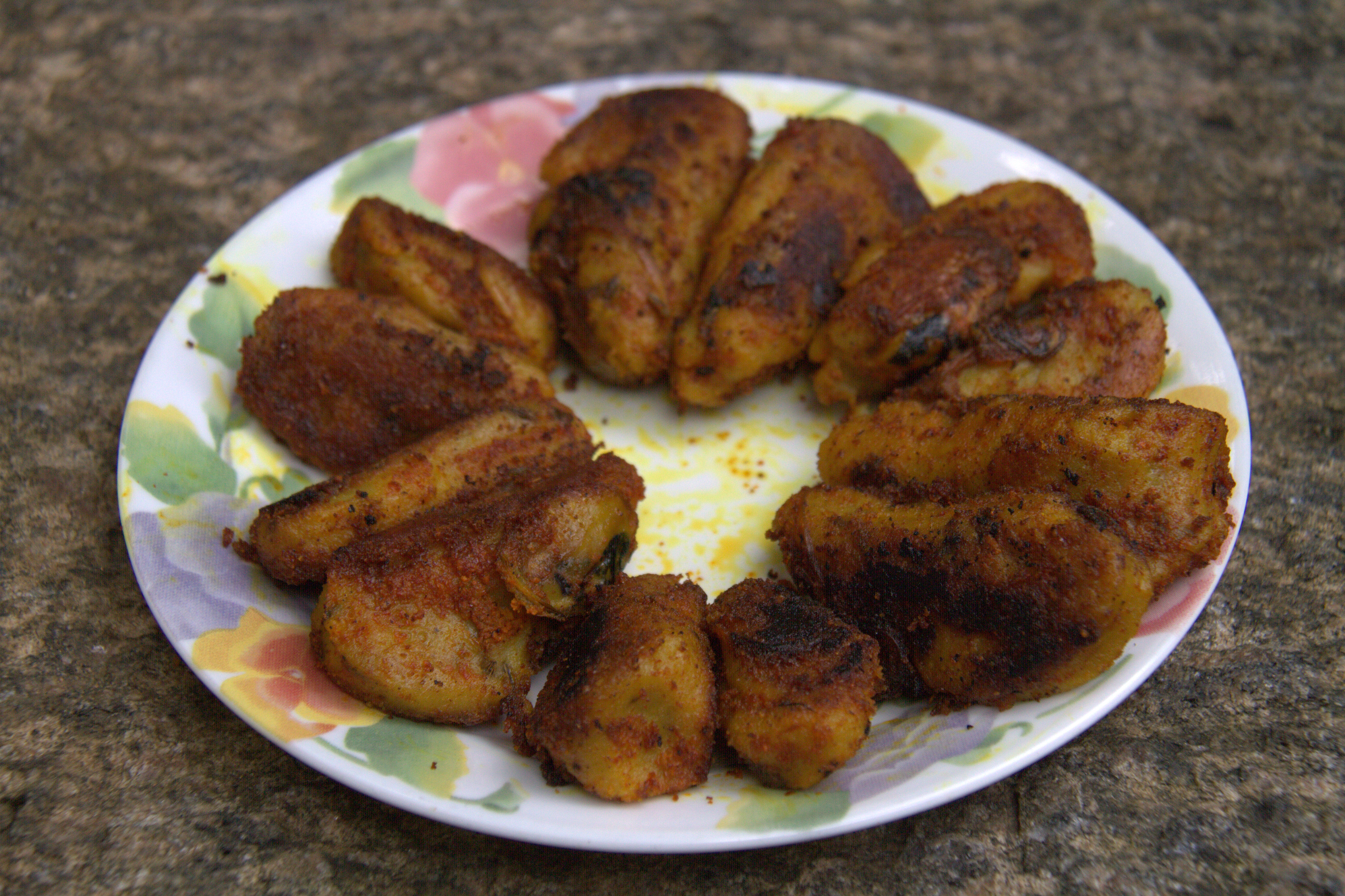
Kallummakkaya nirachathu or arikkadukka (mussels stuffed with rice)

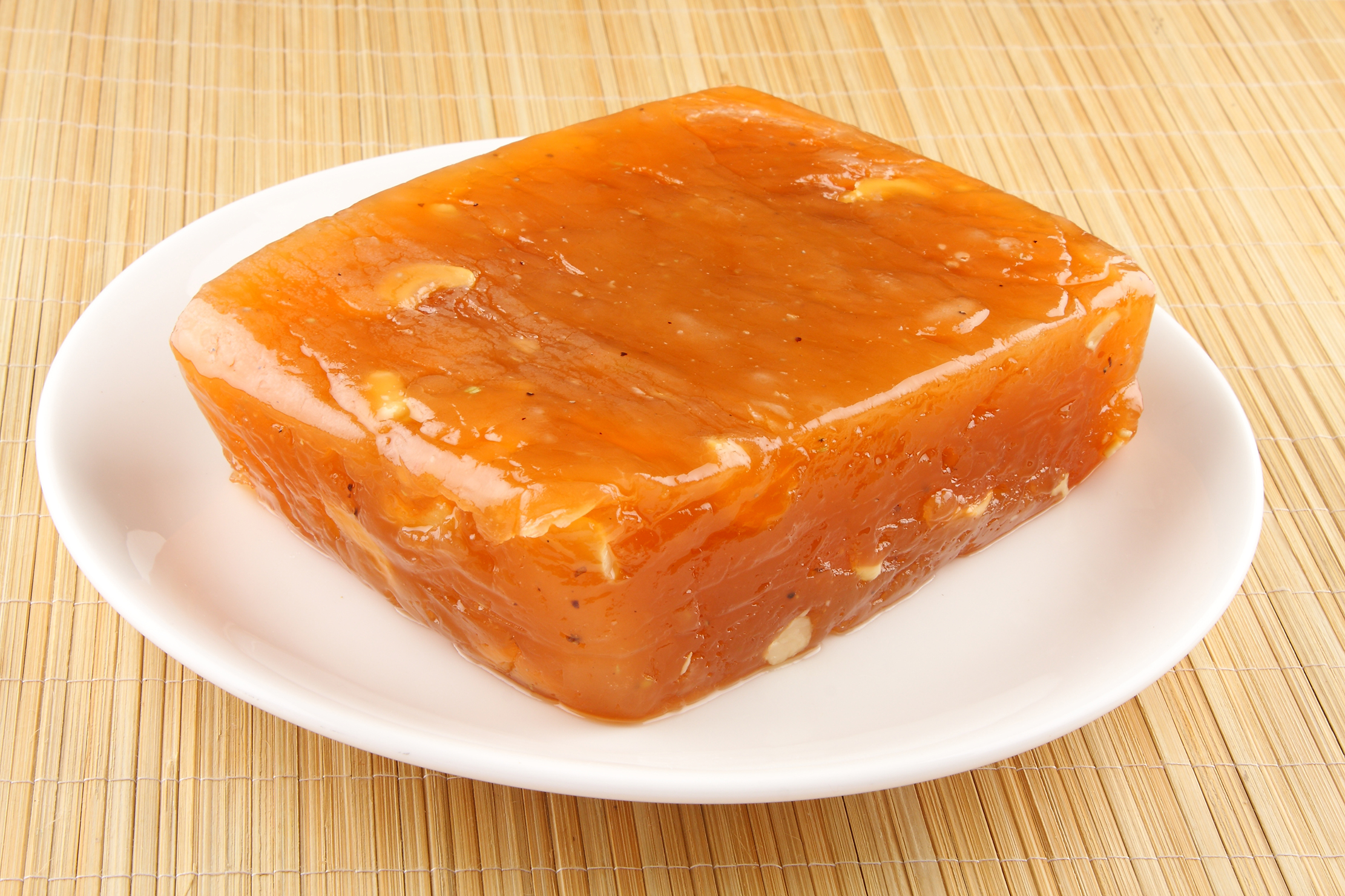
Halwas are popular in Kannur and Thalassery

The Kannur cuisine depicts it culture and heritage. It is famous for Malabar biriyani. The city is also famous for Haluva called as Sweet Meat by Europeans due to the texture of the sweet. Another specialty is banana chips, which are made crisp and wafer-thin. Other popular dishes include seafood preparations (prawns, mussels, mackerel) . Vegetarian fare includes the sadya.

Kannur cuisine is a blend of traditional Kerala, Persian, Yemenese and Arab food culture. This confluence of culinary cultures is best seen in the preparation of most dishes. Kallummakkaya (mussels) curry, irachi puttu (irachi meaning meat), parottas (soft flatbread), Pathiri (a type of rice pancake) and ghee rice are some of the other specialties. The characteristic use of spices is the hallmark of Kannur cuisine—black pepper, cardamom and clove are used profusely.

The Kerala version of biryani, popularly known as kuzhi mandi in Malayalam is another popular item, which has an influence from Yemen. Various varieties of biriyanis like Thalassery biriyani, and Kannur biriyani, are prepared here.

The snacks include unnakkaya (deep-fried, boiled ripe banana paste covering a mixture of cashew, raisins and sugar), pazham nirachathu (ripe banana filled with coconut grating, molasses or sugar), muttamala made of eggs, chatti pathiri, a dessert made of flour, like a baked, layered chapati with rich filling, arikkadukka, and more.

== Transportation ==
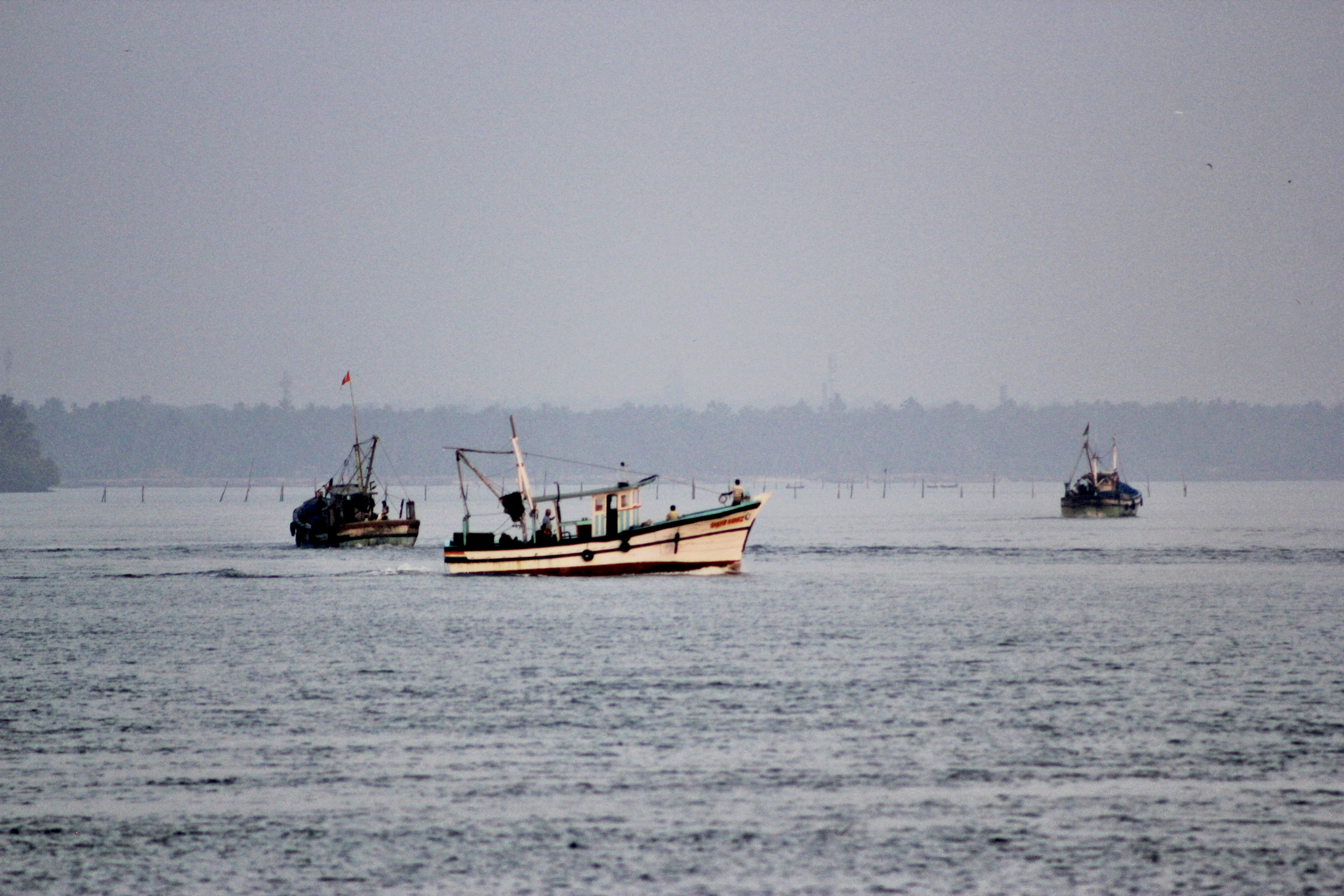
Fishing boats at Matool Azheekkal

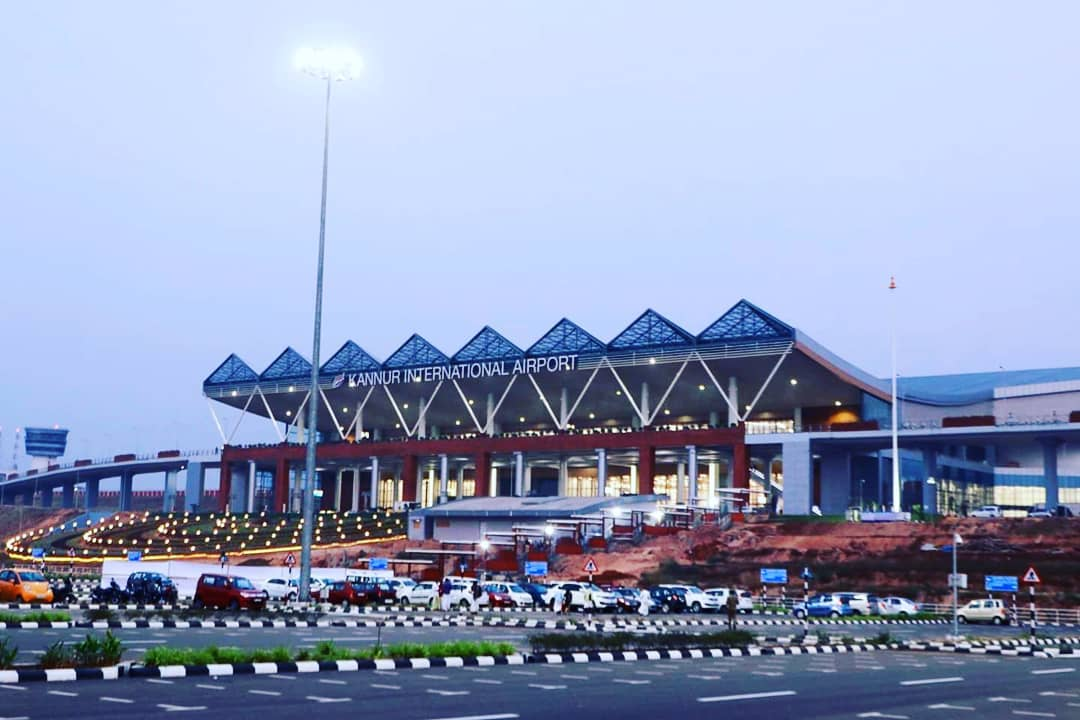
Kannur International Airport serves the city of Kannur

Kannur has a good road network connecting to Mangalore, Bangalore, Mysore, Kodagu and Cochin. The railway station is also well connected to all parts of India. The Kannur International Airport which is about 26 km from the city began operations on 9 December 2018 and is the fourth international airport in the state. Other nearby airports are at Calicut, Mysore and Mangalore.

Kannur is on National Highway 66 or NH 66 (formerly National Highway 17) between Kozhikode and Mangalore. This highway is scheduled to be expanded to four lanes. A bypass for Kannur city is proposed under the NH widening project. Kannur is connected to Kodagu, Mysore and Bangalore in Karnataka by the Kannur-Coorg-Mysore Highway. This highway was upgraded to National Highway in 2017.

Kannur railway station

Kannur railway station is one of the major stations of the Southern Railway zone, under the jurisdiction of the Palakkad. All trains including the Thiruvananthapuram Rajdhani Express and Kochuveli Garib Rath stop at Kannur. Six daily trains and around 15 weekly or bi-weekly trains connect Kannur to the capital Thiruvananthapuram. Kannur is well connected through rail with Mangalore and Kozhikode.

Kannur South railway station and Edakkad railway stations are located under Kannur Corporation limits. Chirakkal railway station is located north of the city. Only passenger trains halt at these three stations.

Kannur International Airport in Mattanur was inaugurated on 9 December 2018. It is the fourth international airport in Kerala. The airport has a 4,000 metres (13,000 ft) runway (the longest in the State) and state of the art passenger terminal as well other amenities. It is well connected by a comprehensive network of roads and a proposal for railway line has also been mooted. In the 2016–17 Union Railway budget, ₹4 billion (US$42 million) were dedicated for this under Extra Budgetary Resource (EBR) in which a part of the bill will be borne by the State Government towards the railway line.

== Notable people ==
=== Literature ===
- Sukumar Azhikode
- Oyyarathu Chandu Menon
- Cherusseri Namboothiri
- N. Prabhakaran
- T. Padmanabhan
- T. K. D. Muzhappilangad

=== Sports ===
- Manuel Frederick
- Jimmy George
- V. P. Sathyan
- Denson Devadas
- C. K. Vineeth
- Sahal Abdul Samad
- Tintu Luka
- Chundangapoyil Rizwan
- Sudha Shah

=== Politicians ===
- M. V. Raghavan
- Pinarayi Vijayan
- K. Karunakaran
- E. K. Nayanar
- K. K. Shailaja
- P. Jayarajan
- E. Ahamed
- M. V. Govindan
- Kodiyeri Balakrishnan
- John Brittas
- E. P. Jayarajan
- Kadannappalli Ramachandran
- A. N. Shamseer
- K. Sudhakaran
- M. V. Jayarajan
- James Mathew
- T. V. Rajesh
- M. V. Nikesh Kumar

=== Actors ===
- Sreenivasan
- M. N. Nambiar
- Malavika Mohanan
- Anaswara Rajan
- Samvrutha Sunil
- Mamta Mohandas
- Vineeth
- Vineeth Kumar
- Deepak Parambol
- Sanusha
- Sanoop Santhosh
- Nikhila Vimal
- Nivetha Thomas
- Sreekala Sasidharan
- Sneha Paliyeri
- Anju Aravind
- Athmiya Rajan
- Sruthi Lakshmi
- Parvathy Nambiar
- Ganapathi S Poduval
- Madonna Sebastian
- Sana Khan
- Santhosh Keezhattoor
- Shamna Kasim

=== Filmmakers ===
- Bejoy Nambiar
- Salim Ahamed
- Vineeth Sreenivasan
- Dhyan Sreenivasan

=== Music (composers) ===
- Kaithapram Damodaran Namboothiri
- Kannur Rajan
- Deepak Dev
- Ifthi
- Shaan Rahman
- Sushin Shyam
- Sayanora Philip

=== Music (playback singers) ===
- Vineeth Sreenivasan
- Shaan Rahman
- Sushin Shyam
- Sayanora Philip
- Arun Alat

=== Cinematographer ===
- K. U. Mohanan

== See also ==
- Kannur North
- Kannur East
- Places of worship in Kannur district
- Largest Indian cities by GDP
