= Kannur South =

Chovva
- Suburb
- Interactive map of Chovva
- Coordinates: 11°52′18″N 75°23′49″E
- Country: India
- State: Kerala
- District: Kannur

Government
  - Body: Kannur Municipal Corporation

Languages
  - Official: Malayalam, English
- Time zone: UTC+5:30 (IST)
- Postal code: 670018
- ISO 3166 code: IN-KL
- Vehicle registration: KL-13

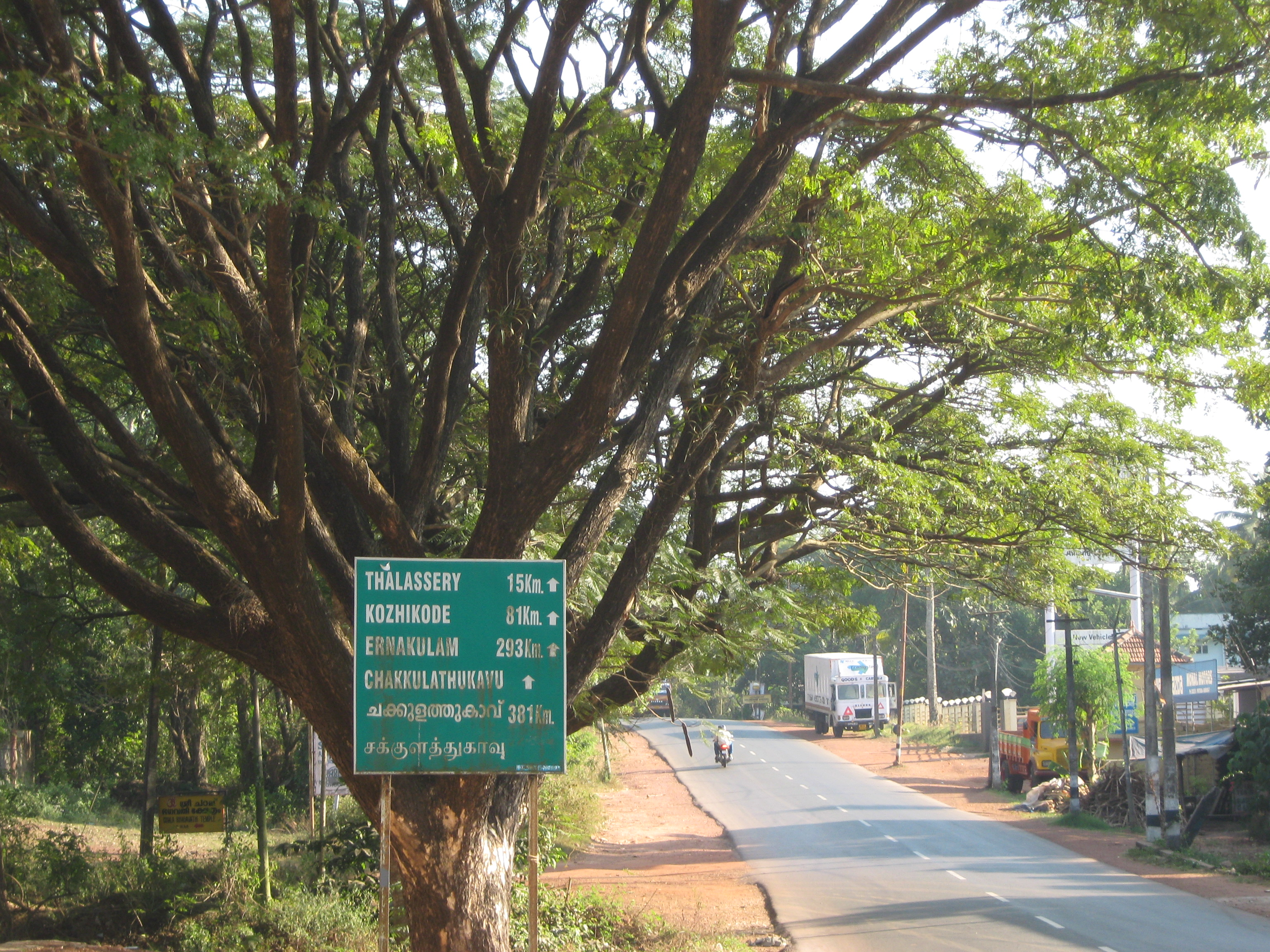
The Road to Thalassery

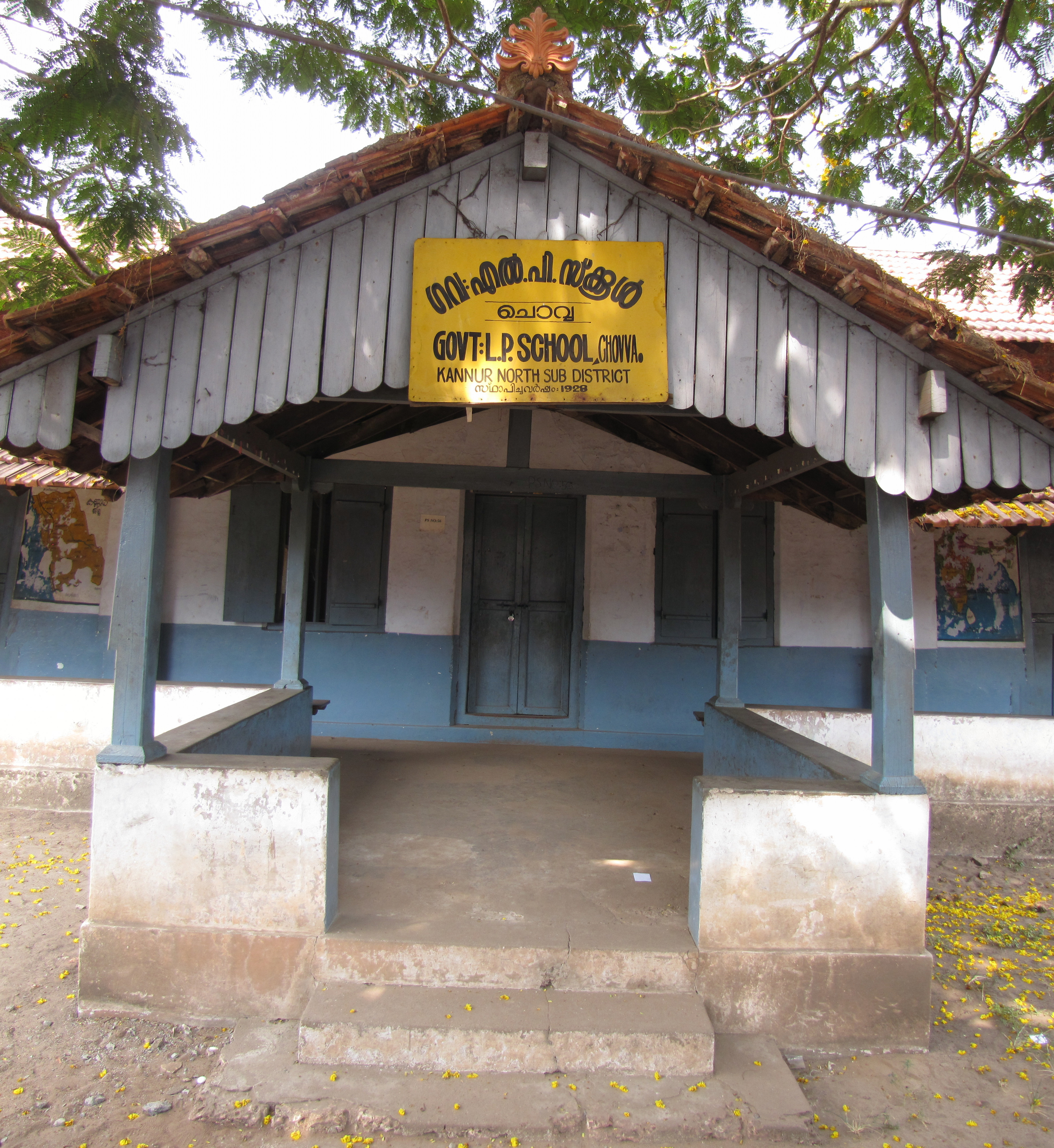
Chovva School

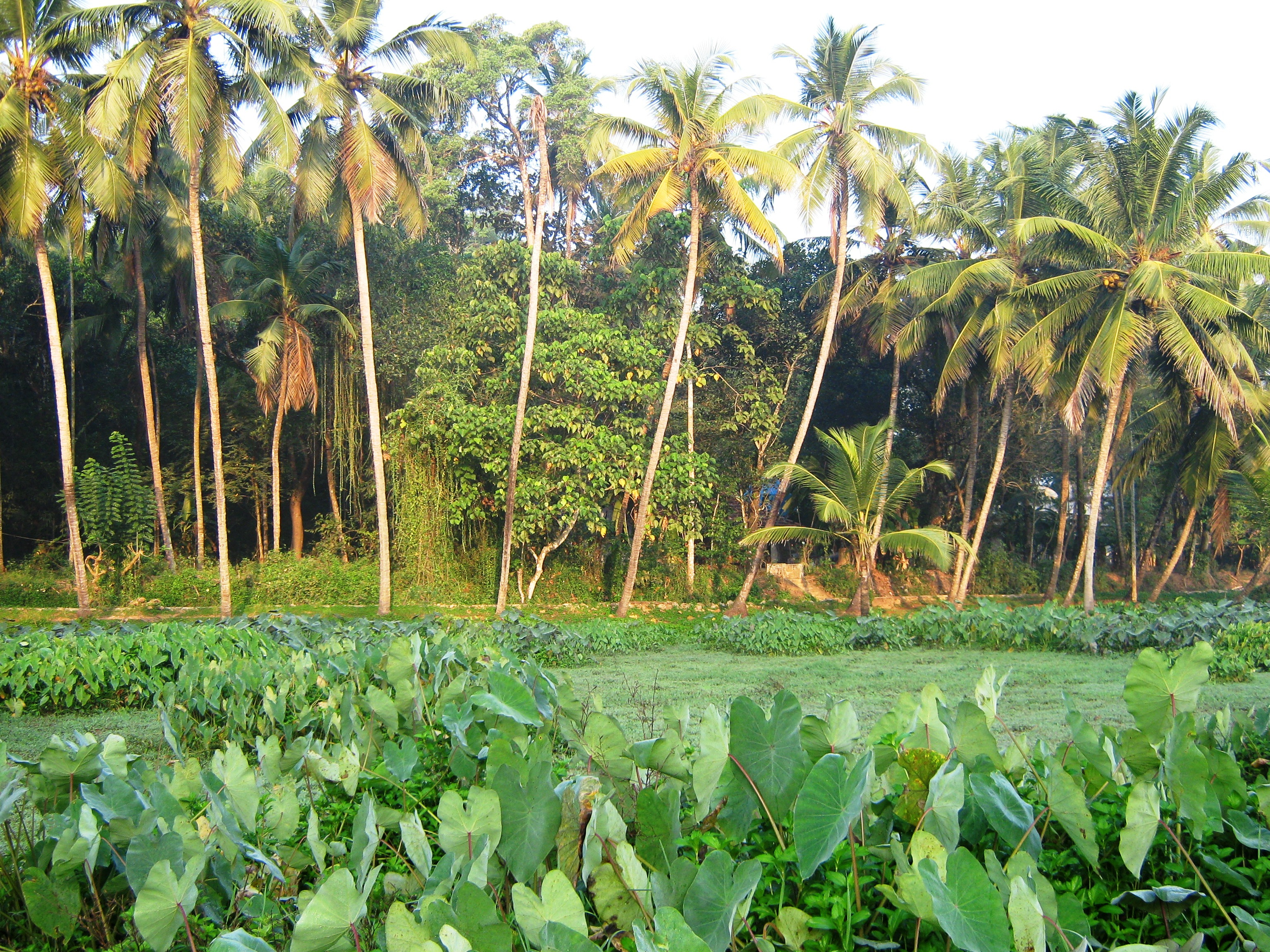
Edachovva, Kannur

Kannur South or Chovva or Thottada is a residential suburb in Kannur District of Kerala, India, which mainly consists of two areas. The National Highway 66 runs through both Thazhechovva and Melechovva. The name Chovva is believed to be derived from the Malayalam word "Chovvu" meaning propriety. Mele and Thazhe are Upper and Lower respectively, indicating that Mele Chovva is relatively at higher altitude compared with Thazhe chovva (a few meters)

Chovva comes under Kannur Municipal Corporations. Other residential suburbs are in Kannur Municipal Corporation Talap, Thana, Kakkad, Chalad, Kannur City, Mundayad, Thottada, Chelora etc.

== Thazhe Chovva ==
Thazhe Chovva is a small town on National Highway 66 between Kannur and Thalassery. It is approx 4 km from Kannur towards south. The nearest Railway station is Kannur South railway station which is about a kilometer from the Thazhe chovva market. Chala-Nadal bypass road which links Thazhe Chovva with Nadal and Chala opened in 2001. This bypass is relatively a straight road saves time by avoiding Chovva railway crossing and the Nadal railway crossing on National Highway 66.

The famous The Cannanore Co-operative spinning mills which employees hundreds people for decades is situated in this town. Chovva Juma Masjid on NH 66 and Sree Muthappan Temple at Charapuram (about a kilometre from Thazhe Chovva on the Thillanur Road) are the two main places of worship in Chovva. The Kottungal Kavvu on S.N college road is another place of worship which has yearly festivals with the traditional Muthappan Theyyam. Muthu Mariyamman Kovil & Kanchi Kamakshi Amman Kovil are other two famous devi kshetram (Temple) for navaratri festivities situated near railway gate on S.N.college road. Masjid Da'awa (Thanke Kunnu Road) and Hamza Palli (Elayavoor Road) are other two mosques in here. Thazhe Chovva is also a home of small community settlements from Andhra Pradesh (Erumakkudi) and Tamil Nadu (Labbatheru).

There is a small river with a bridge that flows through the town locally known as Chovva Thodu or Kaanaam River and merges to Arabian Sea . The only fish market available in Chovva situated near chovva thodu. The major roads branches from this town are City Road (leads to City through Thayyil), Kappad Road (leads to Anjarakandi through Kappad), Elayavoor Road and Thanke Kunnu Road (leads to Attadappa)

One of the oldest reading room and library in Kannur situated in Thazhe Chovva Tezhukkil Peedika. Chovva Govt. LP School and Gowri Vilasam UP School are institutions provide primary education to local students. SN College is hardly 1 km from Thazhe Chovva main bus stop.

== See also ==
- Kannur
