= Edakkad Assembly constituency =

Constituency of the Kerala Legislative Assembly

Coordinates: 11.81°N 75.44°E

Edakkad
- Former constituency for the Kerala Legislative Assembly

Constituency details
- Country: India
- Region: South India
- State: Kerala
- District: Kannur
- Established: 1965
- Abolished: 2008
- Total electors: 1,60,984 (2006)
- Reservation: None

Edakkad was one of the 140 state legislative assembly constituencies in Kerala state in southern India, before the 2008 delimitation of constituencies. It was one of the seven state legislative assembly constituencies included in Kannur Lok Sabha constituency until the 2008 delimitation. The last election to the constituency was conducted in 2006, and the MLA was Kadannappalli Ramachandran of Congress (Secular).

After the delimitation in 2008, Chelora, Edakkad, and Munderi Gram Panchayats became a part of Kannur Assembly constituency, whereas Anjarakkandy, Chembilode, Kadambur, Muzhappilangad, and Peralasseri were added to the newly formed Dharmadam Assembly constituency.

Edakkad Assembly constituency came into existence in 1965. It was created by replacing Cannanore-II Assembly constituency which had existed from 1957 to 1965.

== Local self-governed segments ==
Edakkad Assembly constituency was composed of the following local self-governed segments:

Sl no.	Name	Status (Grama panchayat/Municipality)	Taluk	Now part of
1	Chelora	Grama panchayat	Kannur	Kannur constituency
2	Edakkad	Grama panchayat	Kannur	Kannur constituency
3	Munderi	Grama Panchayat	Kannur	Kannur constituency
4	Anjarakkandy	Grama panchayat	Kannur	Dharmadam constituency
5	Chembilode	Grama panchayat	Kannur	Dharmadam constituency
6	Kadambur	Grama panchayat	Kannur	Dharmadam constituency
7	Muzhappilangad	Grama panchayat	Kannur	Dharmadam constituency
8	Peralasseri	Grama panchayat	Kannur	Dharmadam constituency

The Gram panchayats of Chelora and Edakkad has now merged with the Kannur Municipal Corporation in 2015.

== Election history ==
Election	Votes polled	Winner				Runner-up 1				Runner-up 2				Margin of victory	
Year		Name	Party	Votes		Name	Party	Votes		Name	Party	Votes		Votes	Percent
Constituency defunct as a result of delimitation (2011)
2006	125022 (77.7%)	Kadannappalli Ramachandran	Cong(S)	72579	58.07%	K. C. Kadambooran	DIC	41907	33.53%	N. K. E. Chandrasekharan Master	BJP	4334	3.47%	30672	24.54%
2001	129807 (81.4%)	M. V. Jayarajan	CPI(M)	65835	50.74%	N Ramakrishnan	INC	60506	46.63%	R. V. Sreekanth	BJP	2440	1.88%	5329	4.11%
1996	116603 (78.0%)	M. V. Jayarajan	CPI(M)	59239	51.52%	A. D. Musthafa	INC	51955	45.18%	U. T. Jayanandan	BJP	3049	2.65%	7284	6.34%
1991**	112591 (83.1%)	O. Bharathan	CPI(M)	54965	49.02%	K. Sudhakaran	INC	54746	48.83%	P. Krishnan	BJP	2413	2.15%	219	0.19%
1987	92235 (85.5%)	O. Bharathan	CPI(M)	45008	49.00%	A. P. Jayaseelan	INC	41012	44.65%	M. K. Saseendran	BJP	3832	4.17%	3996	4.35%
1982	73217 (80.5%)	A. K. Saseendran	IC(S)	38837	53.38%	K. Sudhakaran	Ind.	31294	43.02%	K. V. Mohanan	Ind.	1261	1.73%	7543	10.36%
1980	70913 (80.1%)	P. P. V. Moosa	AIML	39843	56.37%	K. Sudhakaran	JNP	29886	42.28%	K. V. Koran	Ind.	617	0.87%	9957	14.09%
1977	67594 (83.8%)	P. P. V. Moosa	ML(O)	34266	51.91%	N Ramakrishnan	INC	30947	46.88%	P. P. Mammu Saheb	Ind.	394	0.60%	3319	5.03%
Major delimitation of constituency
1970	64164 (81.3%)	N Ramakrishnan	INC	31199	49.06%	C. Kannan	CPI(M)	27559	43.34%	T. K. Sreenivasan	NC(O)	4835	7.60%	3640	5.72%
1967	56372 (82.4%)	C. Kannan	CPI(M)	32563	58.99%	P. P. Lakshmanan	INC	22125	40.08%	A. P. C. Moidu	Ind.	512	0.93%	10348	18.91%
1965	54771 (81.7%)	C. Kannan	CPI(M)	30716	57.11%	P. P. Lakshmanan	INC	23072	42.89%	Only two candidates contested				7644	14.22%

** The 1991 Legislative Assembly election to Edakkad was declared void by Kerala High Court for Electoral malpractice and K. Sudhakaran was declared as the winner on 14 August 1992. This decision was upheld by Supreme Court of India in 1996.

== Election results ==
Percentage change (±%) denotes the change in the number of votes from the immediate previous election.

=== 2006 ===
There were 1,60,984 registered voters in Edakkad Constituency for the 2006 Kerala Niyamasabha Election.

2006 Kerala Legislative Assembly election: Edakkad
Party	Candidate	Votes	%	±%
Cong(S)	Kadannappalli Ramachandran	72,579	58.07%	▲58.07
DIC	K. C. Kadambooran	41,907	33.53%	▲33.53
BJP	N. K. E. Chandrasekharan Master	4,334	3.47%	▲1.59
Independent	M. V. Pradeep Kumar	3,471	2.78%	N/A
Independent	C. M. Ramachandran	2,700	2.16%	N/A
Margin of victory		30,672	24.54%	N/A
Turnout		1,25,022	77.66%	▼3.70
Cong(S) gain from CPI(M)		Swing	N/A	

=== 2001 ===
There were 1,59,551 registered voters in Edakkad Constituency for the 2001 Kerala Niyamasabha Election.

2001 Kerala Legislative Assembly election: Edakkad
Party	Candidate	Votes	%	±%
CPI(M)	M. V. Jayarajan	65,835	50.74%	▼0.78
INC	N Ramakrishnan	60,506	46.63%	▲1.45
BJP	R. V. Sreekanth	2,440	1.88%	▼0.77
Independent	K. P. Sureshan	968	0.75%	N/A
Margin of victory		5,329	4.11%	▼2.23
Turnout		1,29,807	81.36%	▲3.40
CPI(M) hold		Swing	▼2.23	

== See also ==
- Edakkad
- Kannur (State Assembly constituency)
- Dharmadam (State Assembly constituency)
- Kannur district
- List of constituencies of the Kerala Legislative Assembly
- 2006 Kerala Legislative Assembly election
