= Chirakkalkulam =

- Neighborhood
- Interactive map of Chirakkalkulam
- Coordinates: 11°51′50″N 75°22′36″E
- Country: India
- State: Kerala
- District: Kannur

Government
  - Body: Kannur Municipal Corporation

Languages
  - Official: Malayalam, English
- Time zone: UTC+5:30 (IST)
- ISO 3166 code: IN-KL
- Vehicle registration: KL-

Chirakkalkulam is a residential neighborhood in Kannur Municipal Corporation of Kerala state, India. Chirakkalkulam is located between Thayatheru and Kannur City. Chirakkalkulam's significance arises from the birth of the historic Arakkal Kingdom.

== See also ==
- Arakkal Kingdom
- Kannur City
- Thayatheru
- Kannur
- Chalad
