= T.O Mohanan =

Indian politician

T. O. Mohanan

Member of the Kerala Legislative Assembly
- Incumbent
- Assumed office 21 May 2026
- Preceded by: Kadannappalli Ramachandran
- Constituency: Kannur

4th Mayor of Kannur Corporation
- In office December 2020 – December 2023
- Preceded by: C. Seenath
- Succeeded by: Muslih Madathil

Personal details
- Born: T. O. Mohanan; 1966 (age 59–60) Kannur district, Kerala, India
- Party: Indian National Congress
- Parent: Gopalan Nambiar (father)
- Education: LLB, Government Law College, Kozhikode
- Occupation: Advocate, Politician

Adv. T. O. Mohanan (born 1966) is an Indian politician and lawyer serving as the member of the legislative assembly (MLA) for the Kannur constituency in the Kerala Legislative Assembly. A prominent leader of the Indian National Congress, he was elected in the 2026 Kerala Legislative Assembly election, wresting the seat back for the United Democratic Front (UDF). He previously served as the mayor of the Kannur Municipal Corporation.

== Early life and education ==
T. O. Mohanan was born to a Gopalan Nambiar in the Kannur district of Kerala. He pursued his legal studies at the Government Law College, Kozhikode, under the University of Calicut, obtaining his LLB in 1998. Prior to his entry into state-level politics, he practiced as an advocate and was active in various social and political organizations in Kannur.

== Political career ==
Mohanan has held several key positions within the Indian National Congress and the UDF in Kannur. He served as the mayor of the Kannur Municipal Corporation, where he was noted for his focus on urban development and infrastructure projects.

In the 2026 Kerala Assembly elections, he was nominated by the Congress to contest from the Kannur constituency, a seat the party sought to recapture from the LDF. He secured a significant victory, polling 70,620 votes and defeating the incumbent veteran leader Kadannappalli Ramachandran of the Congress (Secular) by a margin of 18,551 votes. His campaign highlighted urban grievances and the need for a change in representation for the constituency.

== Controversies ==
=== Melechovva Flyover Project ===
In 2026, T. O. Mohanan faced criticism regarding the proposed Melechovva Flyover project in Kannur, which had been initiated under the previous state government to address traffic congestion. During a meeting convened by Mohanan with local residents and business owners, concerns were raised that the flyover's design was unscientific and could potentially worsen traffic conditions. Following a site inspection, Mohanan directed that construction be suspended pending a final decision.

The project had already undergone preliminary works, including drainage construction, and approximately 100 commercial buildings had been demolished to facilitate its implementation. Critics questioned the possible abandonment of a project that had received financial and technical approvals and for which substantial preparatory work had been completed. Mohanan stated that the concerns raised by residents would be presented to the relevant authorities and that the project should be reconsidered if it was not beneficial to the public.

== Election results ==
=== 2026 Kerala Legislative Assembly election ===
Party	Candidate	Votes	%	±%	
	INC	Adv. T. O. Mohanan	70,620	51.34	+11.85
	Congress (Secular)	Kadannappalli Ramachandran	52,069	37.86	-6.64
	BJP	C. Raghunath	12,854	9.35	-4.50
Margin of victory		18,551	13.48		
Total valid votes		1,37,543			
INC gain from Congress (Secular)		Swing	+9.25		
