= Marakkarkandy =

- Suburb
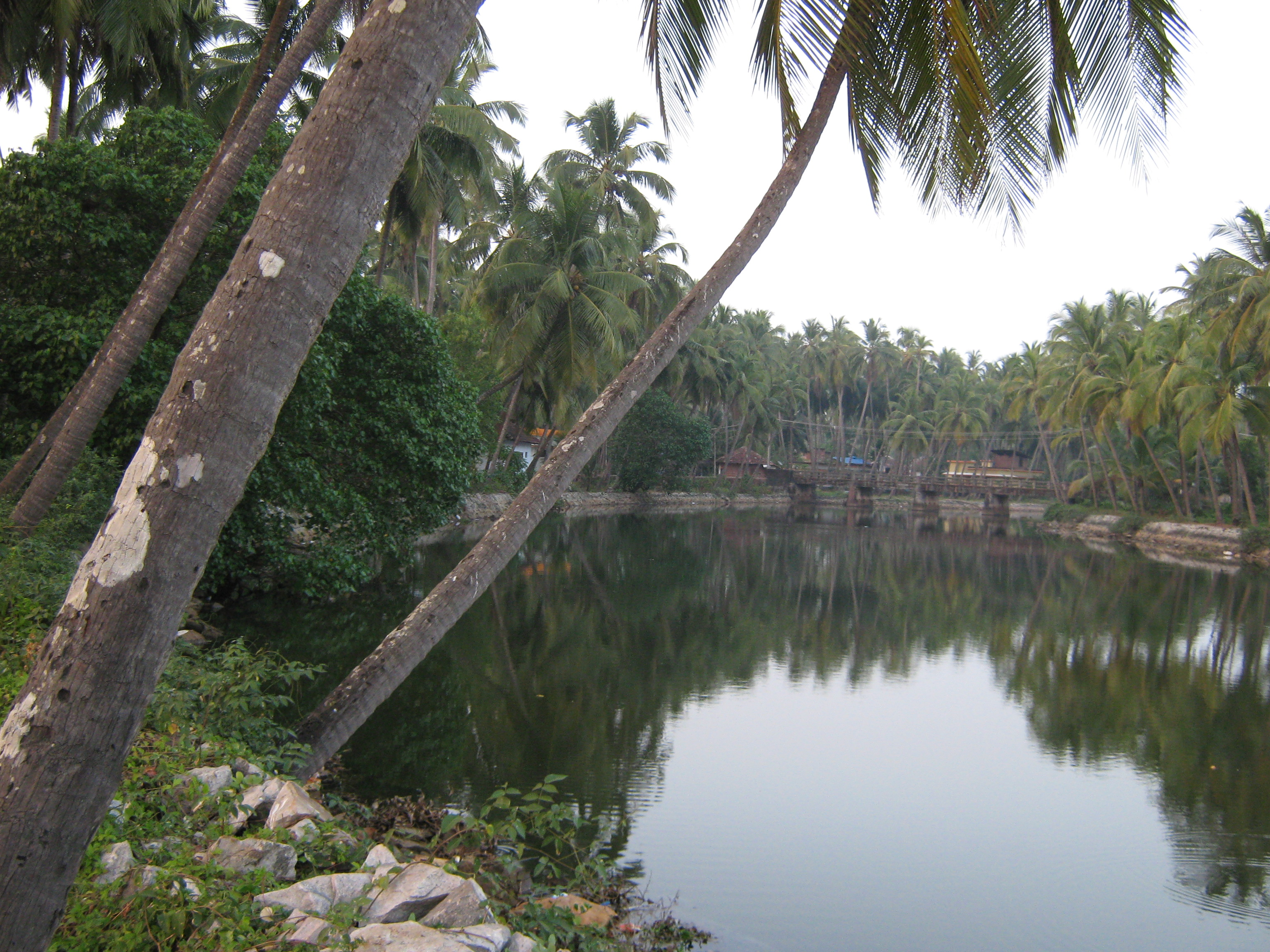
- Maidanappally
- Interactive map of Marakkarkandy
- Coordinates: 11°51′17″N 75°22′59″E
- Country: India
- State: Kerala
- District: Kannur

Languages
  - Official: Malayalam, English
- Time zone: UTC+5:30 (IST)
- ISO 3166 code: IN-KL
- Vehicle registration: KL-13

Marakkarkandy is a suburb of Kannur city in Kerala state, India. It is part of the Kannur Municipal Corporation, located 2 km (1.2 mi) from Thayyil and 6 km (3.7 mi) from Kannur city centre.

Historically, the area was under the rule of the Arakkal dynasty before independence. The Rajiv Gandhi Mini Stadium is located in Marakkarkandy.

Notable people from Marakkarkandy include actress Shamna Kasim and Shakil Ahmed, Chief Secretary of Meghalaya.

== Nearby suburbs ==
- Ayikkara
- Neerchal
- Thayyil
- Kuruva
- Maidhanappally
- Avera Hills
- Kanam Beach
- Adi-Kadalayi
- Thottada Beach
- Kodaparamba
- Burnacherry

== Image gallery ==
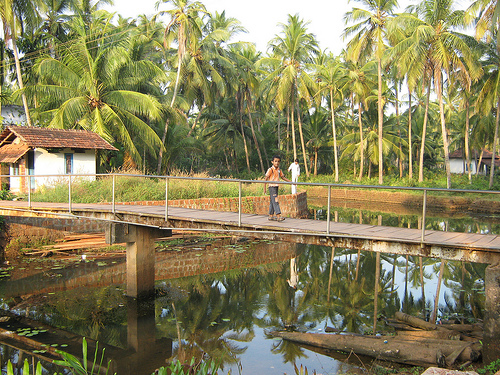
Wooden bridge at Uruvachal

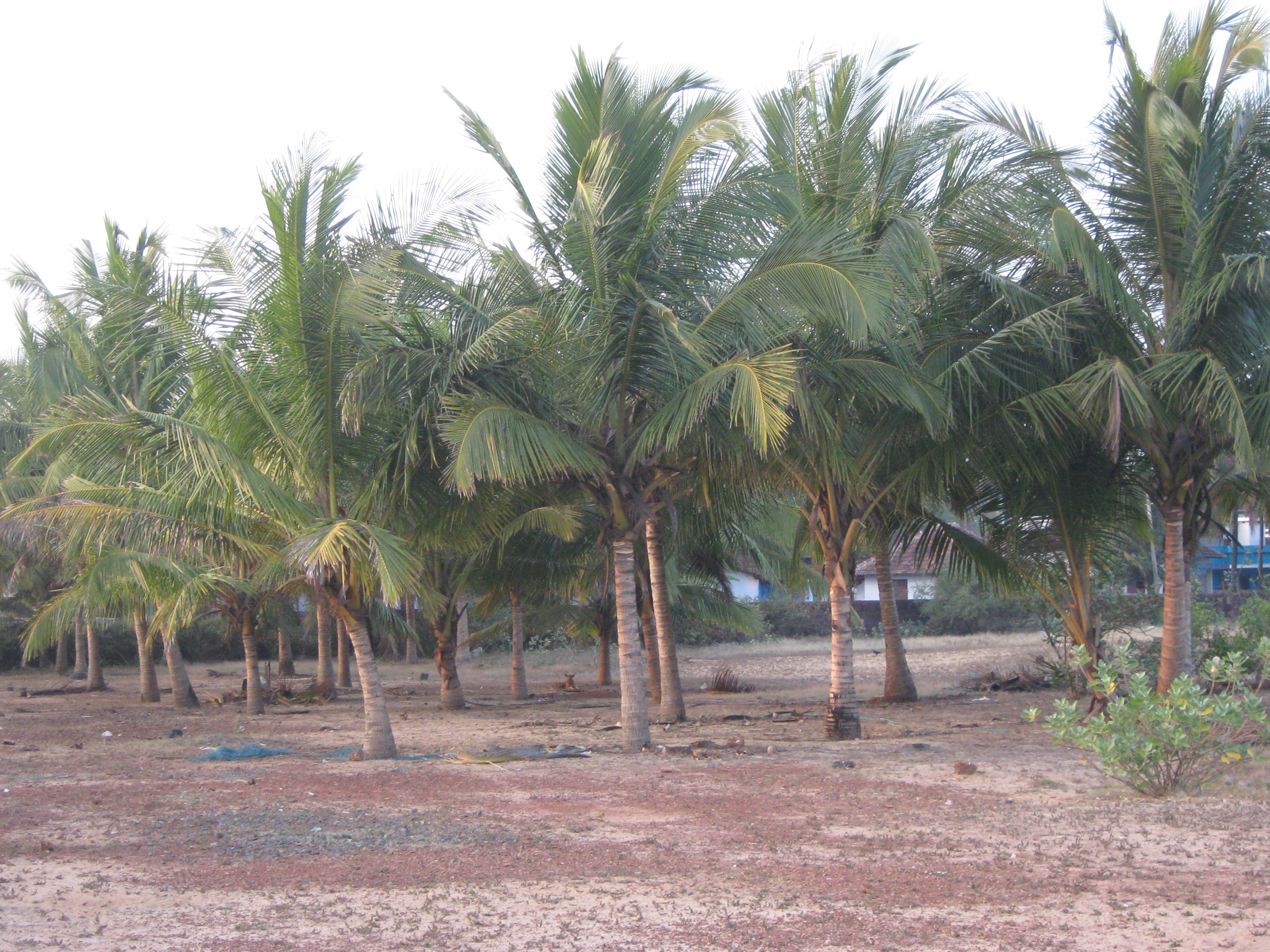
Maidhanappally

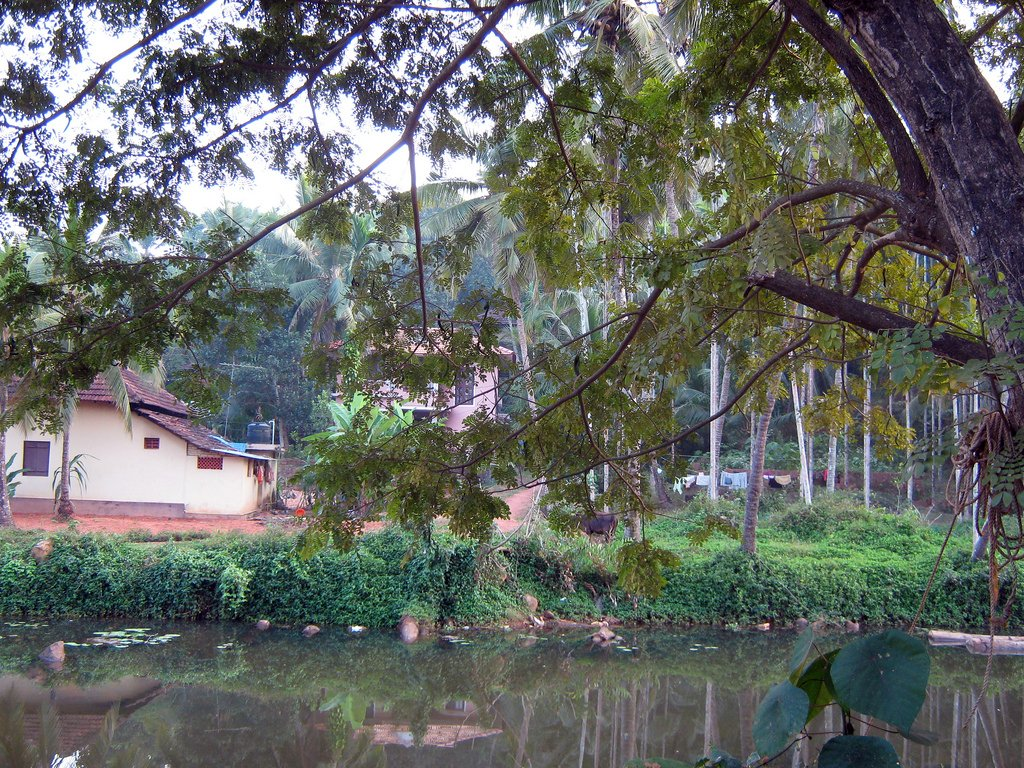
Uruvachal village

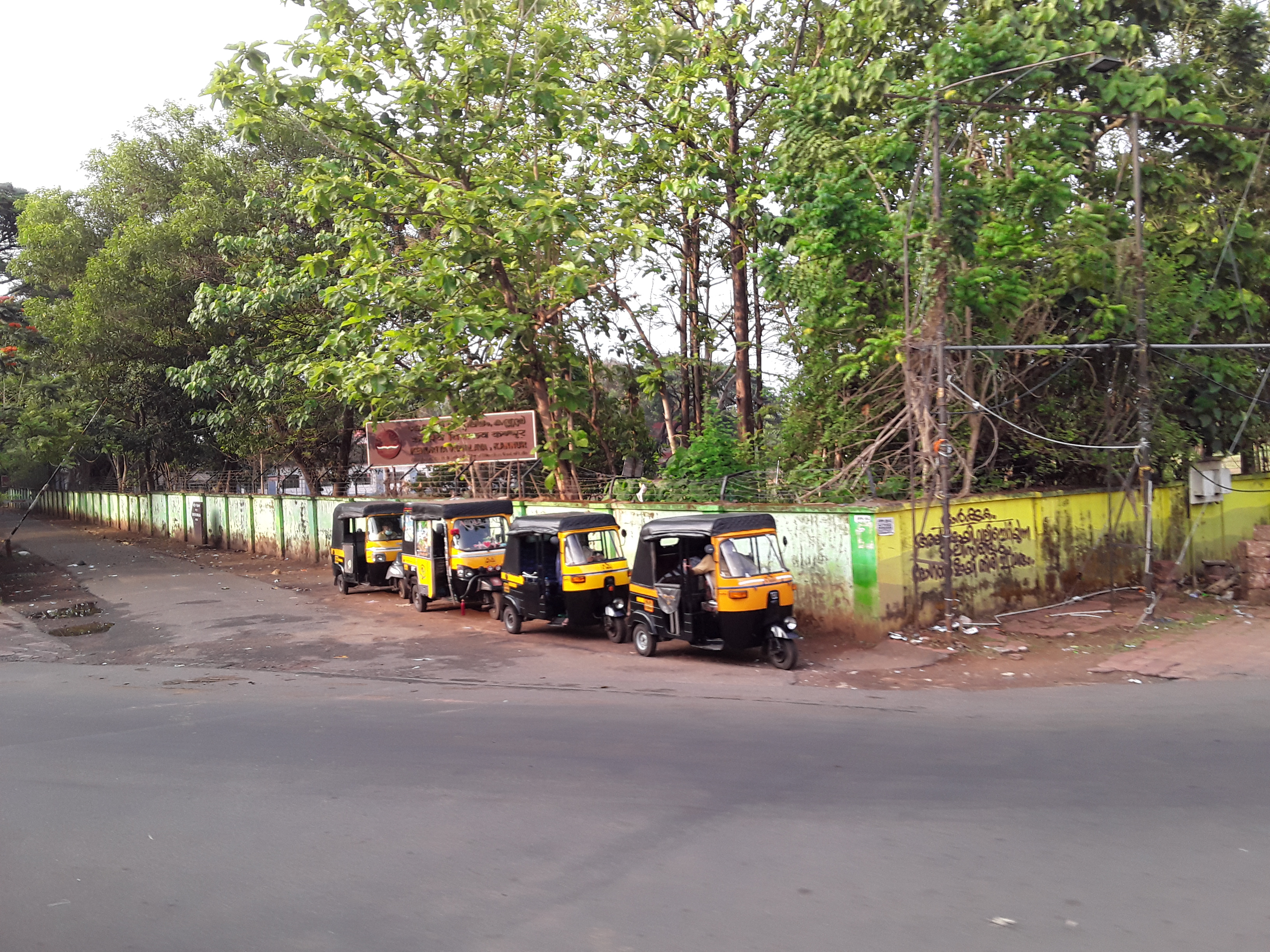
Auto stand

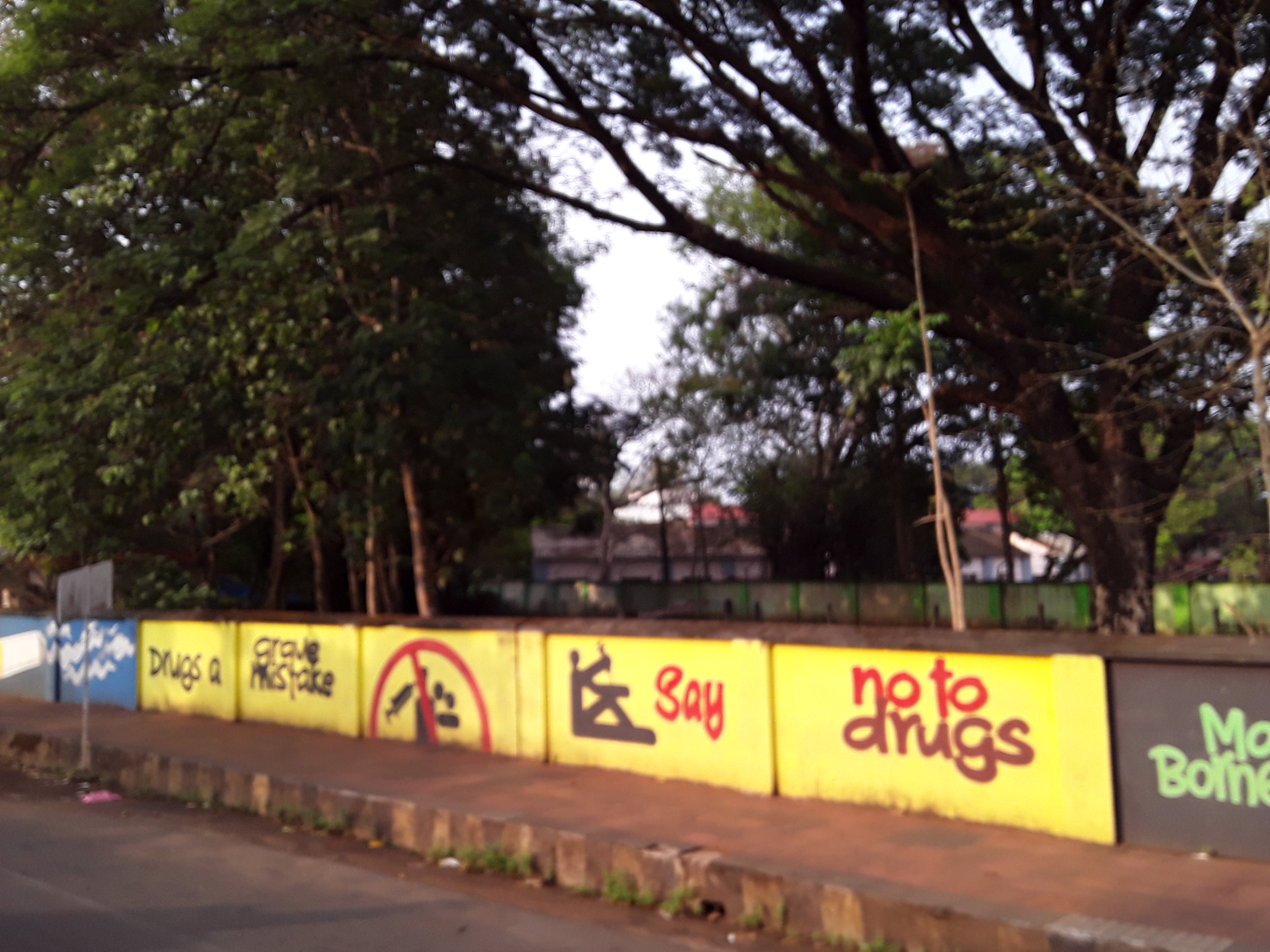
Wall Campaign

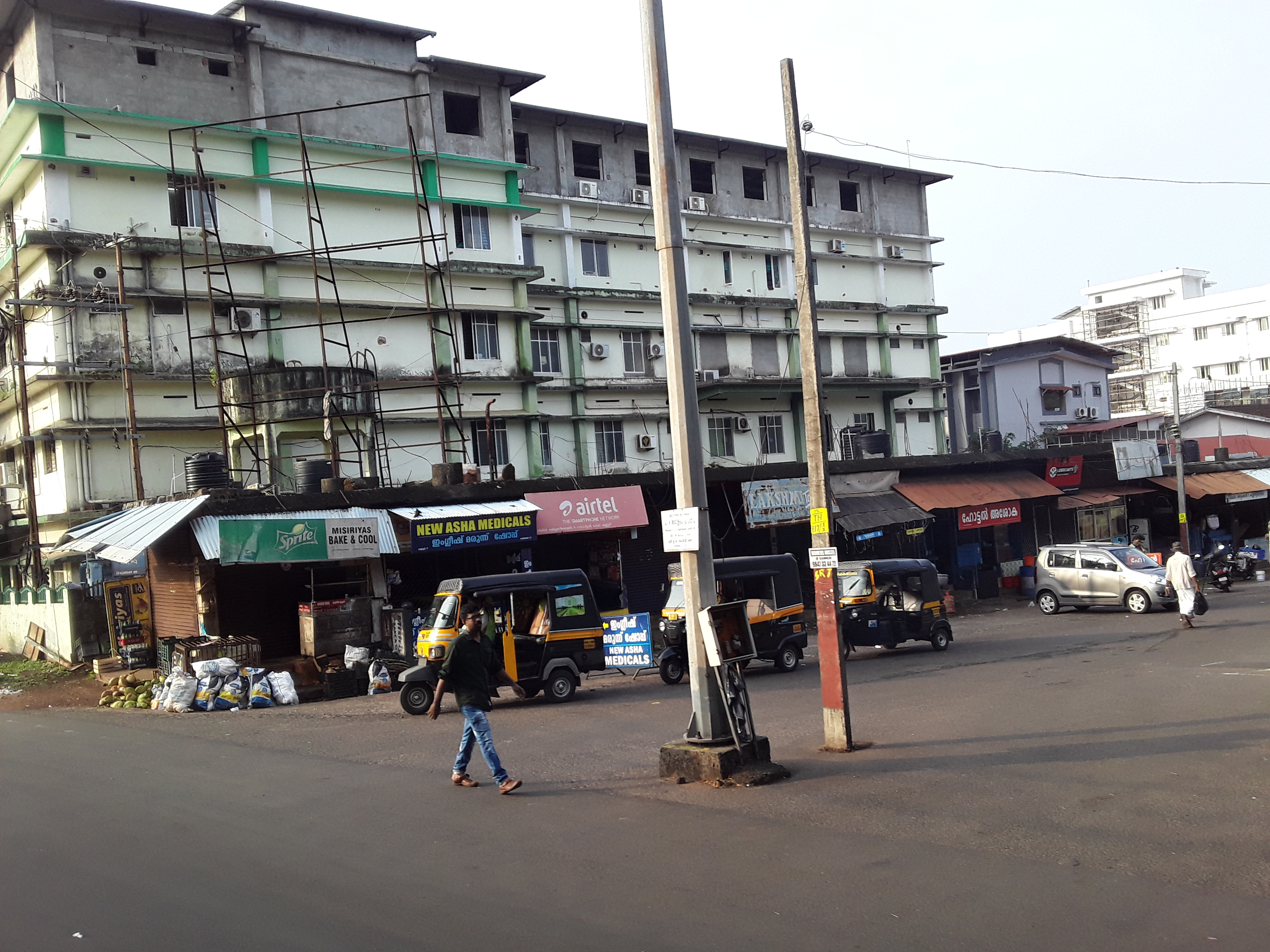
Old Apartments

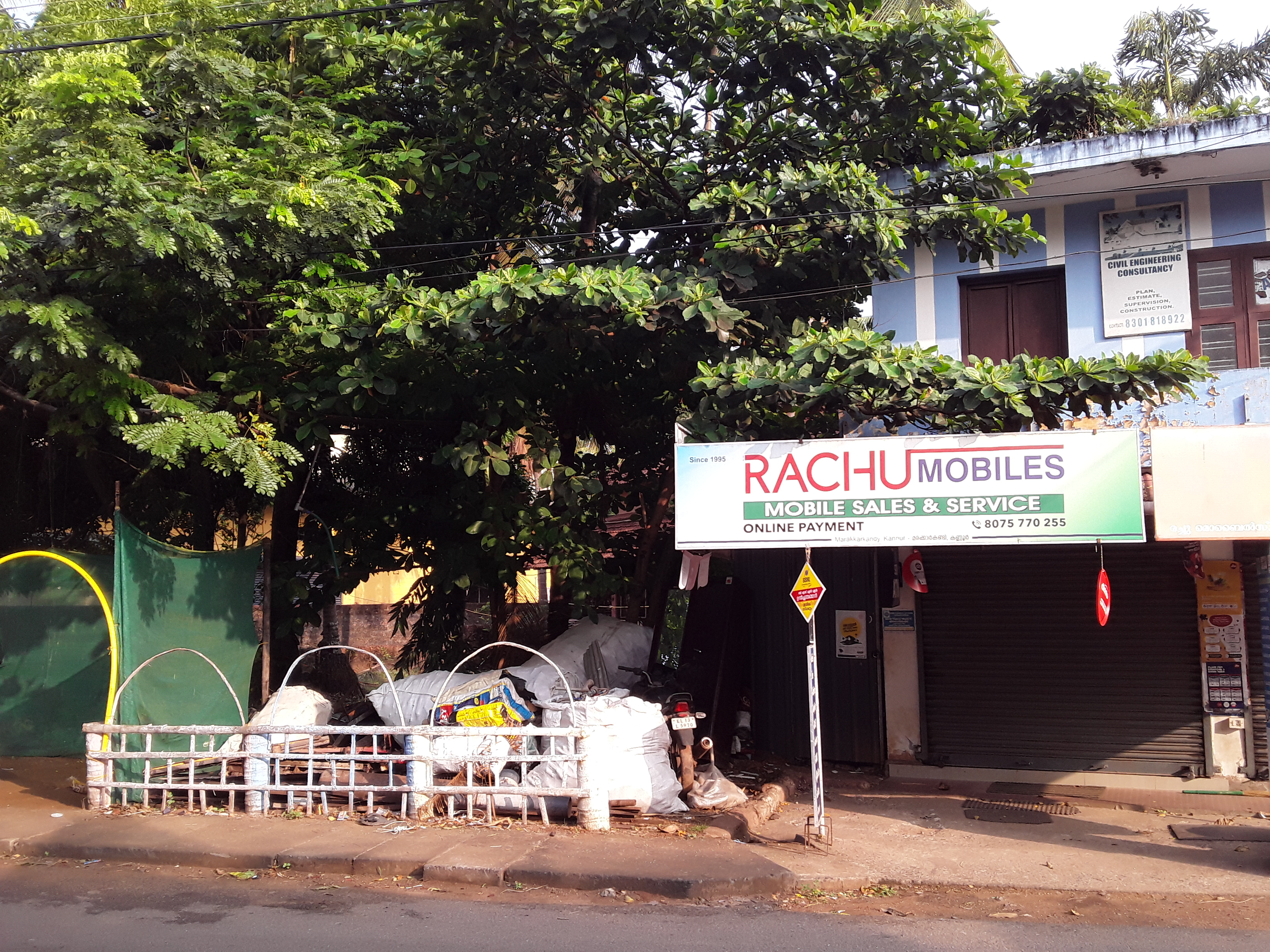
Handset vendor

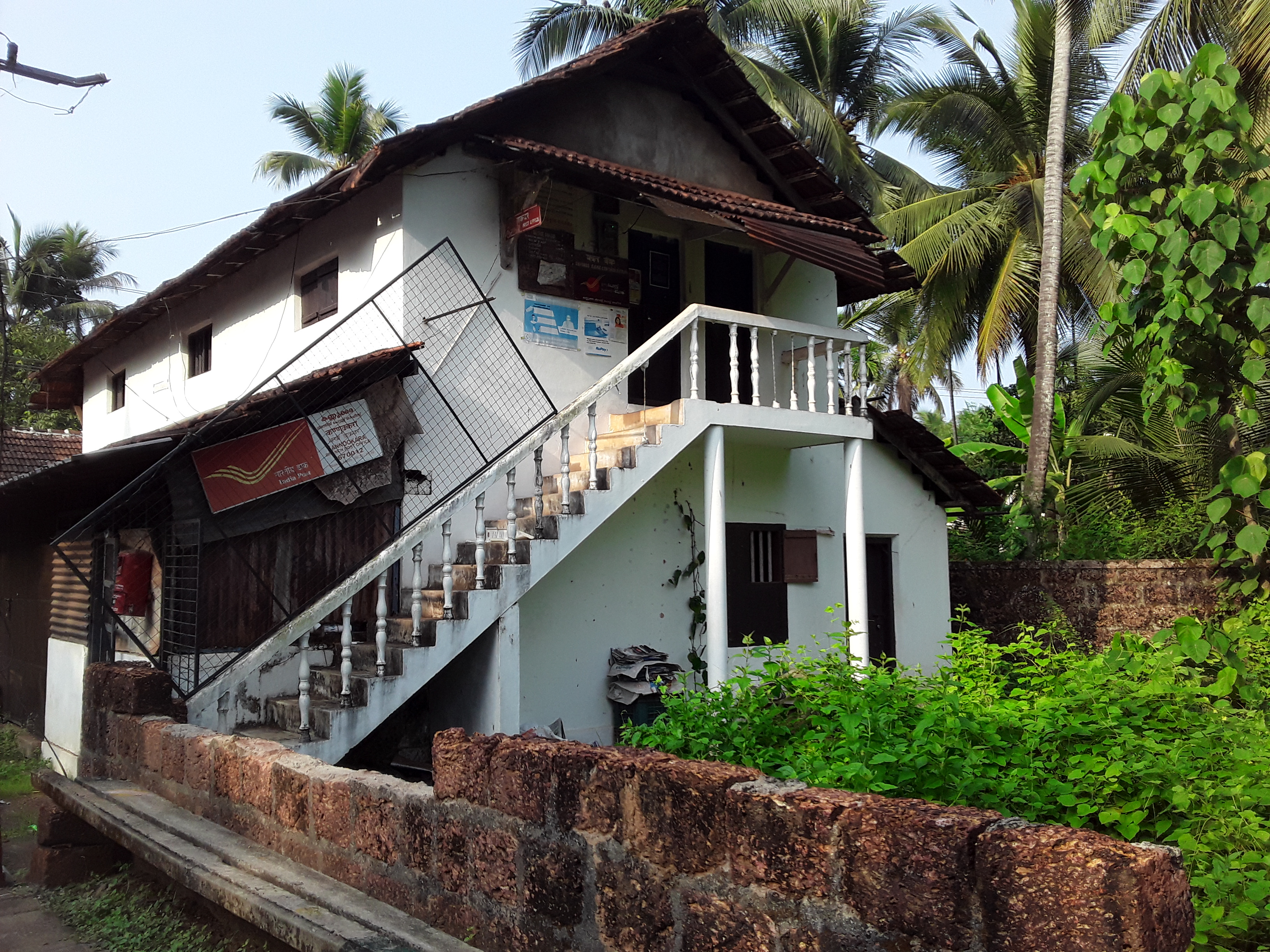
Post Office in Vettilappally
