= Kadannappalli Ramachandran =

Indian politician (born 1944)

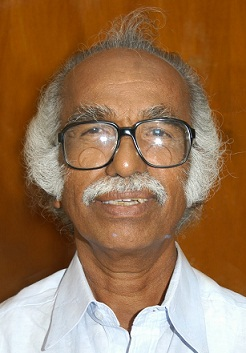

Member of Kerala Legislative Assembly
- In office 19 May 2016 – 21 May 2026
- Preceded by: A. P. Abdullakutty
- Constituency: Kannur
- In office 11 May 2006 – 13 May 2011
- Preceded by: M. V. Jayarajan
- Succeeded by: constituency abolished
- Constituency: Edakkad

Minister of Archaeology and Port, Government of Kerala
- In office 25 May 2016 – 3 May 2021
- Preceded by: Oommen Chandy
- Succeeded by: Ahamed Devarkovil

Minister of Archaeology and Registration, Government of Kerala
- In office 29 December 2023 – 23 May 2026
- Preceded by: Ahamed Devarkovil

Member of Lok Sabha
- In office 1971–1980
- Preceded by: A.K. Gopalan
- Succeeded by: Ramanna Rai
- Constituency: Kasaragod

Minister for Devaswom , Printing and stationery , Government of Kerala
- In office 2009–2011
- Preceded by: G. Sudhakaran
- Succeeded by: V. S. Sivakumar

Personal details
- Born: 1 July 1944 (age 82) Kannur, Madras Presidency, British India
- Party: Congress Socialist Party (2026–present)
- Other political affiliations: Congress (Secular) (until 2026)
- Spouse: T. M. Saraswathi
- Children: 1
- Parents: Krishnan Gurukkal (father); T. K. Parvathy Amma (mother)

Kadannappalli Ramachandran (born 1 July 1944) is an Indian politician who served as the Minister of Archaeology and Registration Of Kerala from December 2023 to May 2026. He previously held the same portfolio from 2016 to 2021. Ramachandran also served as the Minister for Devaswom of Kerala from 2009 to 2011. He is a Member of the Kerala Legislative Assembly representing Kannur since 2016. Prior to that, he represented Edakkad from 2006 to 2011, and Irikkur from 1980 to 1982 in the Kerala Legislative Assembly. He also served as a Member of the Lok Sabha representing Kasaragod from 1971 to 1980, becoming an MP at the age of 27. He is a member of Congress Socialist Party.

== Career ==
He started his political career as I.S.U. Unit President in school life. He was the President of K.S.U. Cannanore Taluk Committee and General Secretary of K.S.U. State Committee. He became Kannur District Convenor of Youth Congress. He was the State Vice President, K.S.U. (1969–71). Ramachandran contested and won the Indian General Elections in 1971 as INC candidate from Kasaragod Lokasabha Constituency, his first opponent was the veteran leader E.K. Nayanar. At that time he was a student in Law Academy. He was re-elected from the same constituency in 1977 also. He became Member of Public Accounts Committee of Lok Sabha and Consultative Committee of Ministry of Railways and Communication.

He became MLA in 1980, 2006, 2016, 2021. He represented the Irikkur constituency, Edakkad constituency and Kannur constituency in Kannur district in the Kerala Legislative Assembly. He became General Secretary of Congress (S) State Committee in 1989 and State President of Congress (S) since 1990.

Ramachandran was the Minister for Devaswom, Printing and Stationery (17 August 2009 to 14 May 2011) and Minister for Ports, Museums and Archaeology (25 May 2016 to 3 May 2021) in the Government of Kerala.

In 2023 he became a Minister in Second Vijayan ministry.

== Personal life ==
Son of P. V. Krishnan Gurukkal and T. K. Parvathi Amma. Ramachandran is married to T. R. Saraswathi, a teacher. They have a son, Mithun Puthanveettil, a musician in the band Avial. He has got a unique style of dressing.

== See also ==
- Kerala Council of Ministers
- Congress (Secular)
