= Neerchal =

Neerchal may refer to:

- Neerchal, Kannur, an area in Kannur District, Kerala, India
- Neerchal, Kasaragod, a village in Kasaragod District, Kerala, India
