= Thottada =

- Suburb
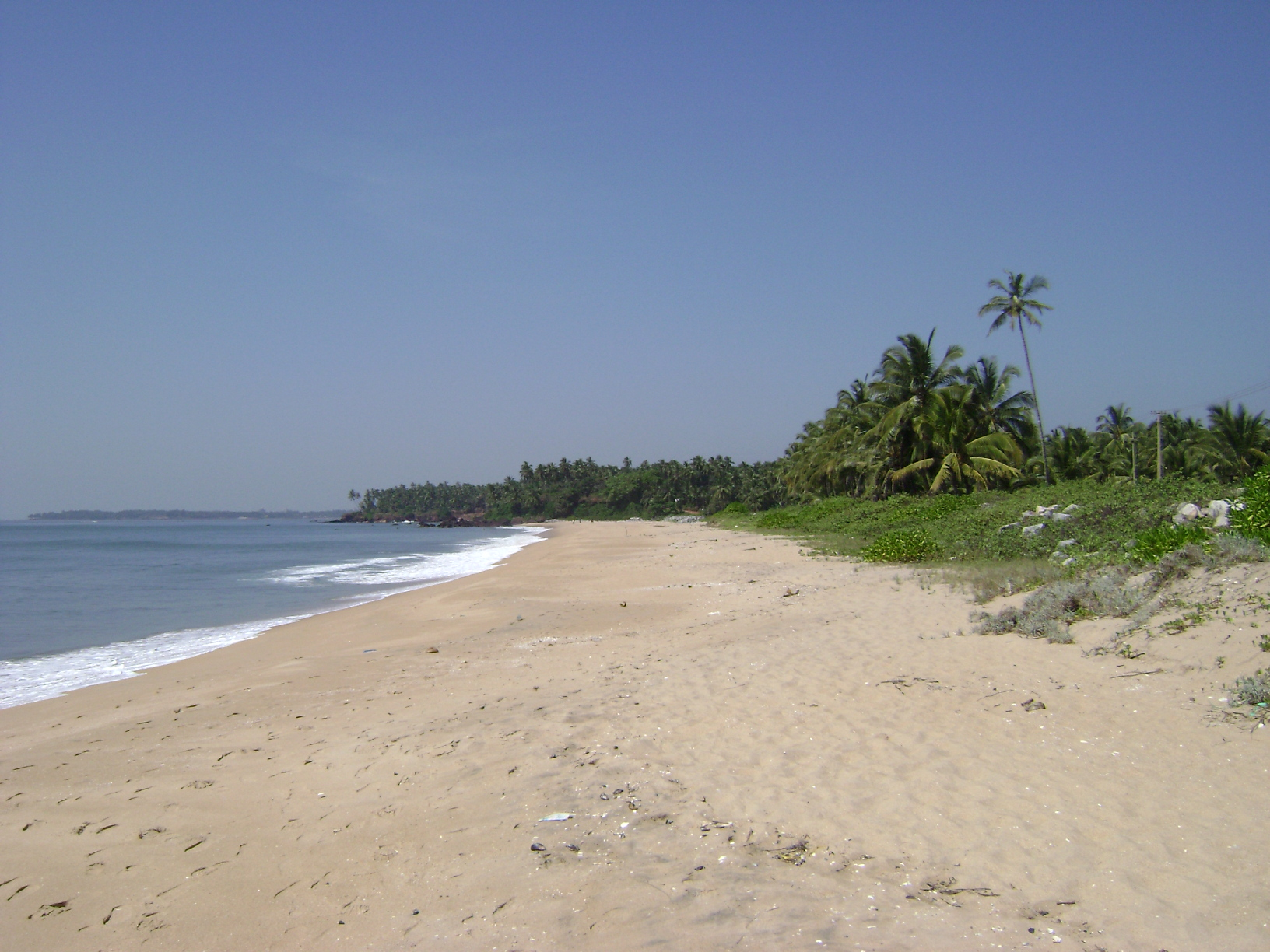
- Thottada beach
- Interactive map of Thottada
- Coordinates: 11°50′35″N 75°25′17″E
- Country: India
- State: Kerala
- District: Kannur

Government
  - Body: Kannur Municipal Corporation

Area
  - Total: 18.37 km^{2} (7.09 sq mi)

Population (2011)
  - Total: 40,818
  - Density: 2,222/km^{2} (5,755/sq mi)

Languages
  - Official: Malayalam, English
- Time zone: UTC+5:30 (IST)
- ISO 3166 code: IN-KL

Thottada is a census town in Kannur Municipal Corporation in Kannur district in the Indian state of Kerala. It is a suburb of Kannur city and lies on NH 66, about 8 km (5.0 mi) southeast of district headquarters Kannur.

The Sree Narayana College (S.N. College), Government Vocational Higher Secondary School Kannur Polytechnic, Kannur ITI and the Institute of Handloom and Textile Technology (IHTT) are located in Thottada.

Thottada is also a scenic place. Thottada beach is an ideal place for a sunbathing and swimming. There are many beach houses and guest houses offering accommodation at reasonable price.

== Demographics ==
As of 2011 Census, Thottada has a population of 40,818 with 18,483 males and 22,335 females. Thottada census town has an area of 18.37 km^{2} (7.09 sq mi) with 8,798 families residing in it. The average sex ratio was 1208 higher than the state average of 1084. Thottada had an average literacy of 96.6%, higher than the state average of 94%: male literacy was 97.8%, and female literacy was 95.6%. In Thottada, 10.5% of the population was under 6 years of age.

== Thottada Beach ==
Thottada Beach is a beautiful beach in Kannur district of Kerala, South India. It is situated at Thottada just about 2.5 km from the NH 66 connecting Kannur city and Thalassery town and 7 km from Kannur city also 13 km from Thalassery. The virgin beach 800 meter long is ideal for sun bathing. Tourists could stay at the beach house or guest house near the beach. The Thottada river (a small one) which is 4.5 km long, flows into one end of the Edakkad beach. There is also a dam/bund built across the river 3 decades ago to keep the fresh water from salt water. Away from the sea the river spreads to form swamps which makes a great habitat for various birds and fishes.

== Kuruva ==
Kuruva is a small village in the Kannur District of Kerala. It is located between Kannur town and Thottada.

Kuruva was once known for its beedi manufacturing, but this industry no longer exists in the village. The Sree Narayana Guru Smaraka Vayanasala were witnessed for many incidents during the Indian independence movement. Many of the local meetings were held here. There were many agricultural activities in the village. But now all the fields have become residential areas.
