= Adikadalayi =

Village in Kerala, India

Adikadalayi is a village situated 6 kilometers from Kannur town in Kannur district. It is a tourist area located near the village of Edakkad. It is in this village that the famous Kadalayi Sree Krishna Temple is situated. The temple attracts thousands of devotees from far and near. Adikadalayi Sri Krishna Temple is located in the heart of Adikadalayi.

== Etymology ==
The deity of the Kadalayi Sriracha Temple was originally installed in a shrine at Kadalayi Kotta in the southeastern part of the present Kannur town. During the British Raj, the city was known as Cannanore, the anglicised form of the Malayalam word Kannur.

== Transportation ==
Adikadalayi is situated 6.9 km away from Kannur Railway station via thayatheru Rd. There are frequent bus services touching Kannur town and Puthiyatheru. You can reach the temple by foot. Taxis and autorickshaws are also available. The nearest major railway station where all trains stop is Kannur on Kozhikode-Kannur sector of the [[Southern Railway (India)|Southern Railway]]. You can take a bus/taxi/autorikshaw from there to reach the temple. The nearest airport is KannurInternational Airport which is approx 25=km from the temple .

== Schools ==
Kadalayi south U.P school is situated opposite to the temple.

== Demographics ==
This grama panchayat has a mixed population of the Hindus (mainly Ezhavas /Thiyyas and Nambiars) and Muslim population.
