= Pallikunnu =

Coordinates: 11°53′34″N 75°21′57″E

Pallikkunnu is a small township in Kannur, Kerala state, in South India. It is in Kannur corporation, on the National Highway between Kannur and Taliparamba. It is three kilometers away from Kannur city.

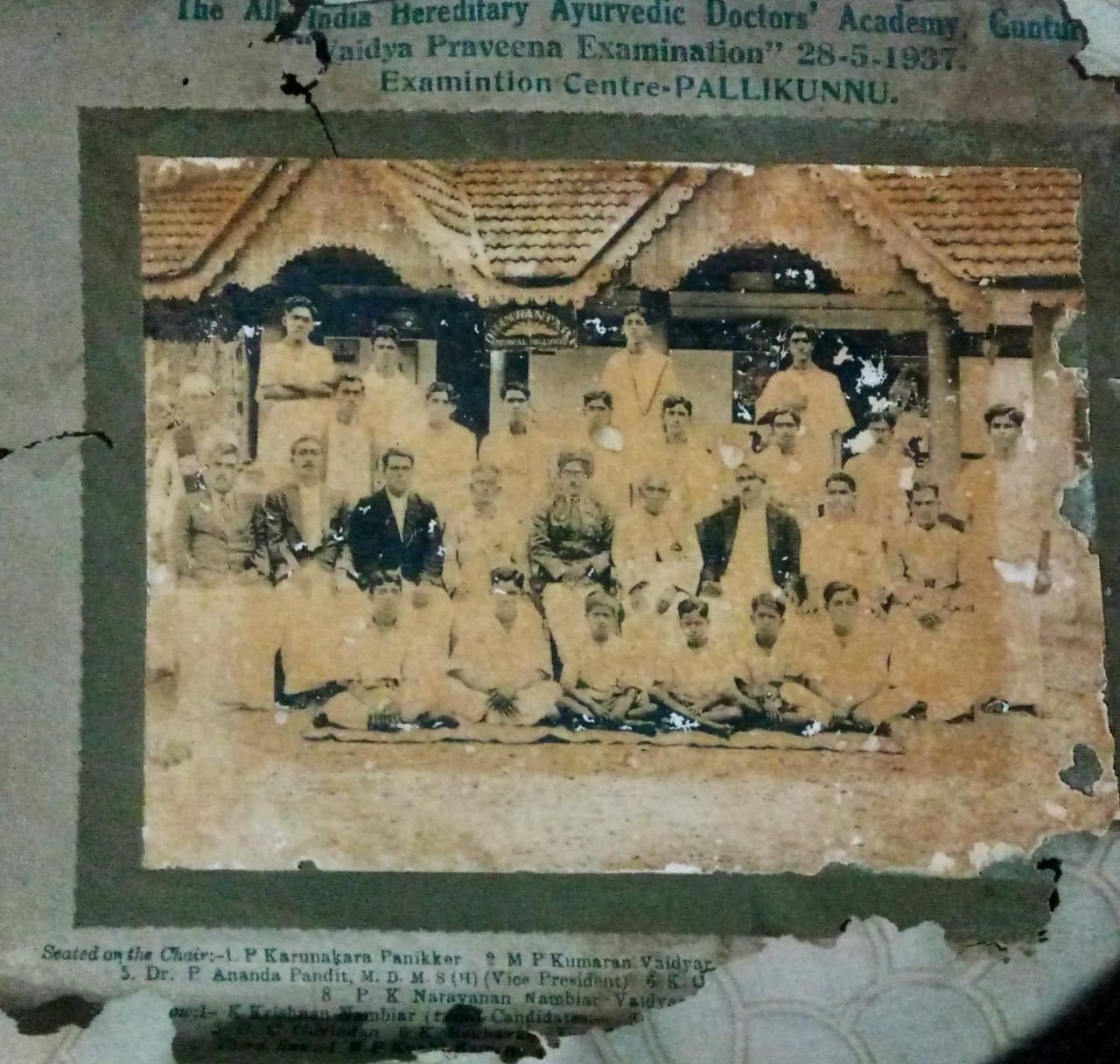
All-India Hereditary Doctors’ Academy exams, August 1927

Pallikunnu houses several educational institutions including Sreepuram English Medium School, the Krishna Menon Memorial Government Women's College, and the Kerala Vocational Training Center.

Pallikunnu is famous for the Mookambika Temple. Another well-known temple is the Kanathoor Maha Vishnu Temple. It is close to the Kadalayi Sreekrishna Temple in Chirakkal.

The Central Prison, where many leaders of the Indian freedom struggle and various local peasant revolts were either brutally imprisoned or mercilessly executed, is located here.

The Doordarshan and Akashvani radio broadcasting stations are also located here.

Pallikunnu was a well-known place during the British empire. Many activities took place at the bungalow of the Superintendent, which has since been converted into a women's college.
