= Kannur Assembly constituency =

Constituency of the Kerala legislative assembly in India

Kannur
- Constituency No. 11 for the Kerala Legislative Assembly
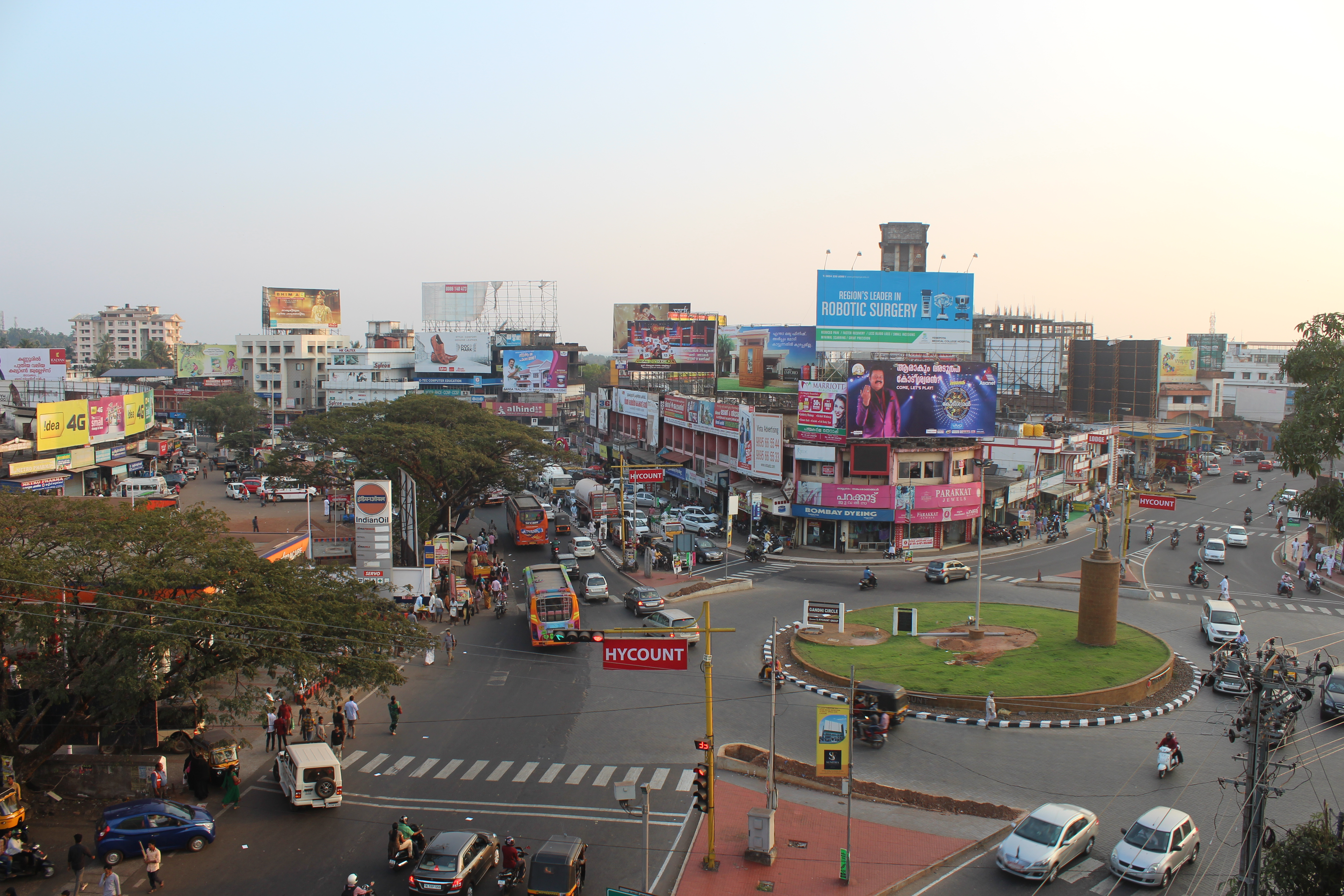
- South Bazar, the central commercial area of Kannur city.

Constituency details
- Country: India
- Region: South India
- State: Kerala
- District: Kannur
- Established: 1965
- Total electors: 182,682 (2026)
- Reservation: None

Member of Legislative Assembly
- 16th Kerala Legislative Assembly
- Incumbent T.O Mohanan
- Party: Indian National Congress
- Elected year: 2026

Kannur Legislative Assembly Constituency is one of the 140 state legislative assembly constituencies in Kerala in southern India. It is also one of the seven state legislative assembly constituencies included in Kannur Lok Sabha constituency. As of the 2026 Assembly elections, the current MLA is T.O Mohanan of INC.

== History ==
Kannur Assembly Constituency, Unlike Kannur District Is A Tradional Bastion Of UDF.For the first election conducted to the Kerala Legislative Assembly in 1957, Kannur city had two Assembly constituencies - Cannanore-I and Cannanore-II. Following the 1965 delimitation, Cannanore-I Assembly constituency was renamed to Kannur while Cannanore-II was replaced by the newly formed Edakkad Assembly constituency.

In the 2008 delimitation of constituencies, a major portion of the erstwhile Kannur Assembly constituency was replaced by Azhikode Assembly constituency. Edakkad Assembly constituency became defunct in 2011. A major portion of the erstwhile Edakkad Assembly constituency is now a part of Kannur Assembly constituency. Currently, the Kannur Municipal Corporation has two assembly constituencies: Kannur and Azhikode.

== Local self-governed segments ==
Kannur Assembly constituency is composed of the following local self-governed segments:

Sl no.	Name	Local Body Type	Taluk
1	Kannur (40 wards out of the 55 wards); Wards List: Wards 14 - 53	Municipal corporation	Kannur
2	Munderi	Grama panchayat	Kannur

== Members of Legislative Assembly ==
The following list contains all members of the Kerala Legislative Assembly who have represented the constituency:

Year	Member	Political party
As Cannanore–I
1957	Kannan Chaliyoth	Communist Party of India
1960	R. Sankar	Indian National Congress
As Kannur
1967	E. Ahamed	Indian Union Muslim League
1970	N. K. Kumaram	Independent politician
1977	P. Bhaskaran	Bharatiya Lok Dal
1980	P. Bhaskaran	Janata Party
1982	P. Bhaskaran	Independent politician
1987	P. Bhaskaran	Indian National Congress
1991	N. Ramakrishnan	Indian National Congress
1996	K. Sudhakaran	Indian National Congress
2001	K. Sudhakaran	Indian National Congress
2006	K. Sudhakaran	Indian National Congress
2009 (Note: By-Election)	A. P. Abdullakutty	Indian National Congress
2011	A. P. Abdullakutty	Indian National Congress
2016	Kadannappalli Ramachandran	Congress (Secular)
2021	Kadannappalli Ramachandran	Congress (Secular)
2026	T. O. Mohanan	Indian National Congress

== Election results ==
=== 2026 ===
There were 182,682 registered voters in the Kannur Assembly constituency for the 2026 Kerala Assembly elections.

2026 Kerala Legislative Assembly election: Kannur
Party	Candidate	Votes	%	±%
INC	T. O. Mohanan	70,620	50.26	▲6.58
Cong(S)	Kadanappalli Ramachandran	52,069	37.05	▼7.93
BJP	C. Raghunath	16,144	11.49	▲2.85
Independent	T. K. Mohanan	281	0.20	
BJKP	Suresh Kumar	255	0.18	
SUCI(C)	M. K. Shahazad	229	0.16	
Independent	Ramachandran Kuniyil	216	0.15	
NOTA	None of the above	705	0.50	▲0.12
Margin of victory		18,551	13.21	▲11.91
Turnout		1,40,519	76.50	▲1.63
INC gain from Cong(S)		Swing	▲6.58	

Local Body	Booths	UDF Votes	LDF Votes	NDA/BJP Votes	Leader	Lead
Munderi	22	8,606	7,775	1,569	UDF	831
Kannur Corporation	157	60,848	43,338	14,338	UDF	17,510
TOTAL	179	69,454	51,113	15,907	UDF	18,341

=== 2021 ===
There were 1,73,961 registered voters in the constituency for the 2021 election.

2021 Kerala Legislative Assembly election: Kannur
Party	Candidate	Votes	%	±%
Cong(S)	Kadannapalli Ramachandran	60,313	44.98	▲1.82
INC	Satheeshan Pacheni	58,568	43.68	▲1.57
BJP	Archana Vandichal	11,581	8.64	▼1.83
SDPI	B Shamsudheen Moulavi	2,069	1.54	▼0.48
NOTA	None of the above	504	0.38	▼0.48
Independent	Satheesan P	147	0.11	−
Independent	Ramachandran P V	107	0.08	−
Independent	N K Surendran	84	0.06	−
Margin of victory		1,745	1.3	
Turnout		1,34,089	74.87	▼2.51
Cong(S) hold		Swing		

=== 2016 ===
There were 1,63,205 registered voters in the constituency for the 2016 election.

2016 Kerala Legislative Assembly election: Kannur
Party	Candidate	Votes	%	±%
Cong(S)	Kadannapalli Ramachandran	54,347	43.06	▼0.15
INC	Satheeshan Pacheni	53,151	42.11	▼6.78
BJP	K. G. Babu	13,215	10.47	▲6.44
SDPI	Sufira K. P.	2,551	2.02	▼0.22
WPOI	N. P. Sathar	755	0.60	−
NOTA	None of the above	517	0.41	−
Independent	K. Sudhakaran	223	0.18	▼0.79
Independent	Satheesan Pazhayadath	97	0.08	−
Independent	Satheesan Edathil Veedu	79	0.06	−
Independent	Ramachndran Thayale Purayil	77	0.06	−
Independent	Ramachandran Potheravalappil	73	0.06	−
Margin of victory		1,196	0.95	
Turnout		1,26,219	77.34	▲1.48
Cong(S) gain from INC		Swing		

=== 2011 ===
There were 1,43,828 registered voters in the constituency for the 2011 election.

2011 Kerala Legislative Assembly election: Kannur
Party	Candidate	Votes	%	±%
INC	A. P. Abdullakutty	55,427	48.89	
Independent	Kadannapalli Ramachandran	48,894	43.21	
BJP	U. T. Jayandan	4,568	4.03	
SDPI	P. C. Noushad	2,538	2.24	
Independent	M. P. Abdullakutty	1,100	0.97	
Independent	K. Sudhakaran	517	0.46	
Independent	S. Noorudeen	226	0.20	
Margin of victory		6,443	5.68	
Turnout		1,13,360	78.82	
INC hold		Swing		

== See also ==
- Kannur
- Kannur district
- List of constituencies of the Kerala Legislative Assembly
- 2016 Kerala Legislative Assembly election
