= Oorpazhachi Kavu =

Hindu temple in Kerala, India

- Oorpazhachi Kavu, Edakkad, Kannur, Kerala

Religion
- Affiliation: Hinduism
- District: Kannur
- Deity: Bhagavati

Location
- Location: Edakkad
- State: Kerala
- Country: India
- Interactive map of Oorpazhachi Kavu
- Coordinates: 11.8251°N 75.4359°E

Architecture
- Type: Architecture of Kerala

Specifications
- Temple: One
- Elevation: 40.32 m (132 ft)

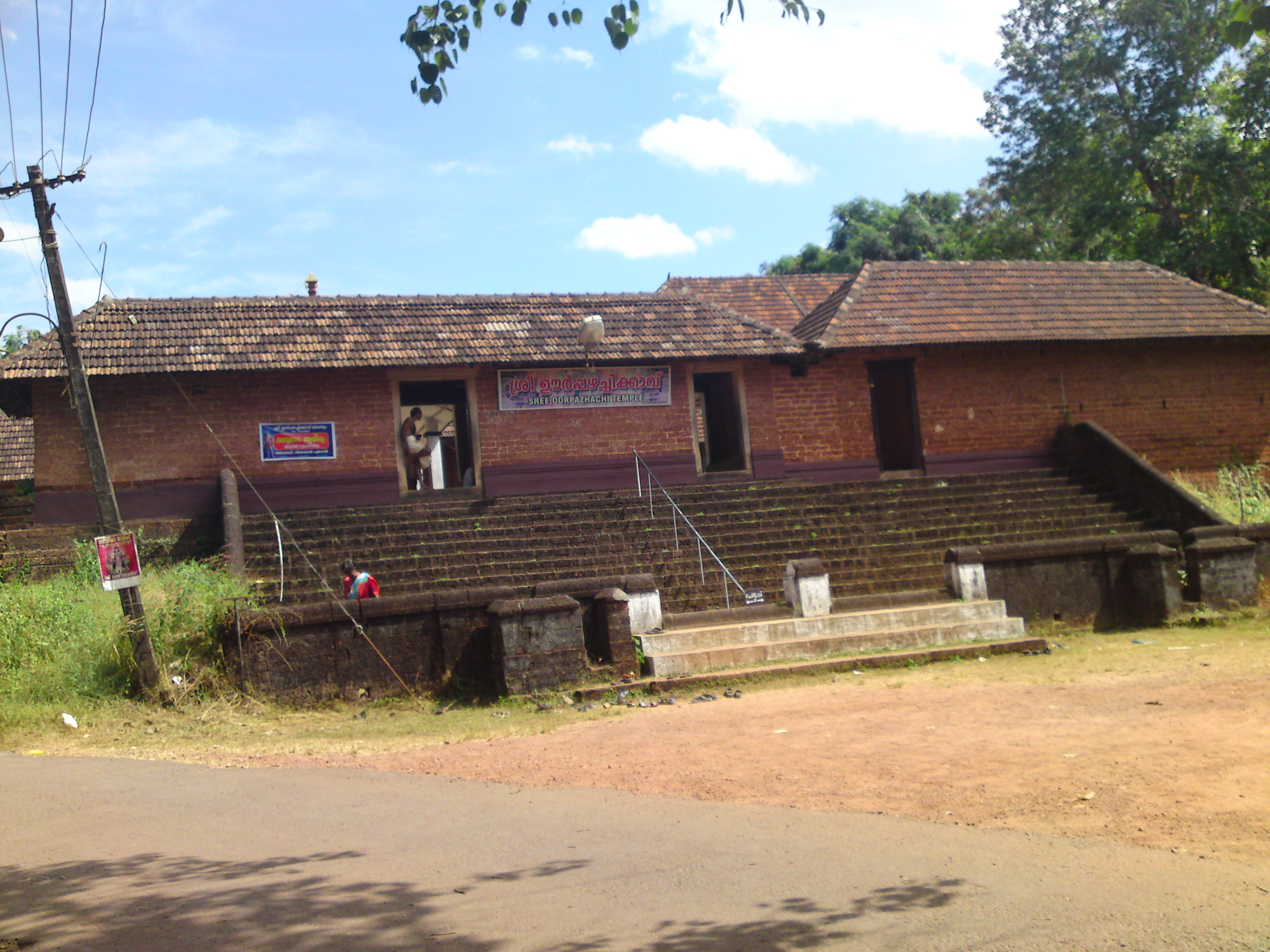
Oorpazhachi Kavu

Sree Oorpazhachi Kavu is a Hindu temple in the Edakkad grama panchayat in Kannur District of Kerala state in southern India.

== History ==
In the 1790s, the temple administration fled with the idols and valuables from the looting of temple by Tippu Sultan and took refuge in a confidential sanctuary of Akkaraveettil Tharavad in Thalassery. The deities were brought back and re-consecrated only after Tippu withdrew from Malabar. The Akkaraveetil family later donated their Thevarappura (worship house) to the administration as it had been used for housing the deities during the invasion.

The temple was enlarged in a reconstruction from 1845 to 1899.

== Temple administration ==
=== Ooralars (hereditary trustees) ===
The term Oor means village and ooraalan (ooraalar, if joint partnership) means master or proprietor of the village. The Sree Oorpazachi Kavu temple was the seat of an ooraalar that enjoyed partial autonomy and administered the region. Nine prominent Nambiar families were Ooraalar and constituted the village and temple assembly that arbitrated local administration.

=== Oorpazhachi Devaswom ===
Sree Oorpazhashi Kavu and its shrines and property are administered by hereditary members of the board of trustees, the most senior males in the matrilineal line of the nine Nambiar lineages. An elected chairman of the board of trustees manages the day-to-day activities of the temple, assisted by an executive officer appointed by the board of trustees.

== Legends of the deities ==
The temple's three main deities are Bhagavathy, Sree Oorpazhachi Daivathar and Kiratha sunu (Vettakkorumakan). Within the inner courtyard are Shaiva, Vaishnava, and Shaktheya sanctums. There is also a shrine of Thondachan at the upper citadel (Mele Kottam).

=== Bhagavathy ===
The deity of Bhagavathy represents the Mother Goddess. A legend associated with her at Sree Oorpazhachi Kavu tells how Kali (the dark complexioned Goddess Parvathi) became Gauri (the fair complexioned Goddess parvathi) after Shiva repeatedly addressed her as Kali which she took to be taunting her for her dark complexion. She said, "Wounds from arrows can heal and axed trees can regrow during the rain but a heart broken by impolite words cannot be made". After promising herself that she would rejoin her husband only after attaining a fair complexion, she left her husband’s home to perform penance for a hundred years to attain a fair complexion. Pleased with her penance, Brahma granted her the colour of a lotus tendril (gaura varnam) and she became Gauri.

=== Sree Oorpazhachi Daivathar ===
The deity of Sree Oorpazhachi Daivathar is Vaishnava amsham. A legend tells how Sree Oorpazhachi became Sree oorpazhachi Daivathar Kiratha sunu. (Vettakkorumakan) was a great warrior but his pride distressed the Gods, at whose request Vishu disguised himself as a hunter and engaged Vettakkorumakan in a duel with bow and arrows. During the duel Vettakkorumakan sensing a divinity in his opponent, asked, " Daivathil aar?" and received the reply "Daivathar". In the course of the duel.

=== Vettakkorumakan ===
The deity of Vettakkorumakan is Shaiva amsham. A legend says that he was the son of, Shiva and Parvathi. He misbehaved, disturbing the peace. Mahavishnu humbled the boy, gave him a dagger (Churika) and, when eventually pleased, blessed him.

=== Thondachan ===
The deity of Thondachan represents Kshetrapalan (temple custodian) and is believed to be the grand ancestor. The shrine of Thondachan is at the upper citadel (mele kottam). His idol has a bow and arrow on his left hand and a churika in his right. His citadel serves as the site of performance for two forms of oracle dances, Vellattom and Kaliyattom, representing Vaishnava and Shaiva elements respectively. Thondachan is thus revered as Vishnu-Shiva in single form (as Guru and Vaidya (physician)).

==== Shaneeshwara Sankalpam (Saturn worship) ====
Melekottam is also the sanctum for the worship of Shani (Saturn). A legend says that Rama visited the holy grove of Eachil and received the blessings of Sree Oorpazhachi Bhagavathy to redeem him of his Shani Dosha and facilitate the destruction of Ravana and his contingent of demons.

== See also ==
- Temples of Kerala
