= M. V. Jayarajan =

Indian politician (born 1960)

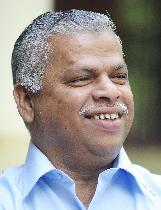

Member of the Kerala Legislative Assembly
- In office 1996 – 2006
- Constituency: Edakkad

Personal details
- Born: 24 May 1960 (age 66)
- Party: Communist Party of India (Marxist)
- Spouse: K. Leena
- Children: Sanjay M.V, Ajay M.V
- Parents: V. K. Kumaran; M. V. Devaki

M. V. Jayarajan (born 24 May 1960) is an Indian politician and a member of the Communist Party of India (Marxist) Kerala State Committee .

== Personal life ==
He was born to V. K. Kumaran and M. V. Devaki on 24 May 1960. He is a graduate and has an LLB. He married K. Leena and has two sons.

== Political career ==
He held the positions of all India joint secretary and state secretary of DYFI, the youth wing of CPI(M), during his youth.

He was elected to the Kerala Legislative Assembly in 1996 and 2001 from Edakkad constituency in Kannur District. He is also known for serving as the private secretary of the Chief minister of Kerala Pinarayi Vijayan for a few years, in one of the rare instances in which a high-profile leader has served in that post. M.V. Jayarajan quit the position as Chief Minister's Private Secretary in 2019, when he was elected as the district secretary of Kannur for CPI(M) to replace P. Jayarajan.
