= Thayatheru =

- Neighborhood
- Interactive map of Thayatheru
- Coordinates: 11°52′10″N 75°22′35″E
- Country: India
- State: Kerala
- District: Kannur

Government
  - Body: Kannur Municipal Corporation

Languages
  - Official: Malayalam, English
- Time zone: UTC+5:30 (IST)
- ISO 3166 code: IN-KL
- Vehicle registration: KL-

Thayatheru is a residential neighbourhood in Kannur Municipal Corporation in the Indian state of Kerala. The name translates to "the street below" in Malayalam.

The area is predominantly residential. The district office of the Malayalam daily newspaper Malayala Manorama is located in Thayatheru. The North Malabar Chamber of Commerce office is also situated nearby.

== See also ==
- Kannur City
- Kannur
