= Edakkad =

- Suburb
- Interactive map of Edakkad
- Coordinates: 11°48′41″N 75°26′25″E
- Country: India
- State: Kerala
- District: Kannur
- Block Panchayat: Edakkad

Government
  - Body: Kannur Municipal Corporation

Languages
  - Official: Malayalam, English
- Time zone: UTC+5:30 (IST)
- PIN: 670663
- Telephone code: 0497
- ISO 3166 code: IN-KL
- Vehicle registration: KL 13
- Nearest city: Kannur
- Lok Sabha constituency: Kannur
- Vidhan Sabha constituency: Kannur

Edakkad is a suburb of Kannur city in Kerala state, India. It is part of Kannur municipal corporation.

== History ==
Currently there are little sources about ancient history of the city. It is said that Edakkad grama panchayat of Kannur in ancient times was referred to as Madhya-adavi (in Sanskrit Madhya means middle and Adavi means forest). Similarly Eda means middle and kadu means forest. Thus the Malayalam derivative "Edakkad" is an adaptation of its original Sanskrit name. According to local lore, Edakkad also was historically referred to as Prashnamargapuram (town of Prashnamargam treatise in horary astrology). This honorary name evolved due to the seminal horary astrological treatise calledPrashna Margam being written by Panakkattu Namboodiri (1624-1694 A.D.) around 1649 A.D. at the Lord Narasimha temple (Edakkadappan temple) in this panchayat. The author's first disciple, according to tradition, was a poet known as Kukaniyal, his real name was Sankaran kaniyar who belonged to the Kaniyar community who lived in his family house (Kaniyan Kandiyil) also situated in Edakkad. Kukaniyal of Edakkad is accredited to have later written another astrological treatise Prashna-Ritti. While these accounts are central to local identity, academic citations for the specific link between these names and current name remain ambiguous.

== Administrative History ==
According to William Logan, along with Chembilod, Iruveri, Makreri, Anjarakandi, Mavilayi, and Muzhappilangad, Edakkad was part of Randatara/Randattara. According to him, this place was ruled by the Randattara Achanmars. Interestingly, another name for Randattara was “Poyanad,” which means “the place from which somebody left.” This was because, according to one of the reports of the Cheraman Perumal legend, Perumal left from here to Makkah to see the Prophet Muhammad. Logan adds that “to this day, Randattara is commonly called Poyanad (i.e., the country from which Perumal ‘went’ or ‘set out’ on his journey to Arabia), referring to the legendary journey of the Chera king to Makkah in Arab traditions.”

Under British rule, Edakkad was part of Chirakkal Taluk, an administrative unit in British Malabar. At that time, the taluk was divided into 43 amshams (villages), including Kannur, Payyannur, Anjarakandy, and Taliparamba. Edakkad was one of the villages in this taluk. During this period, judicial matters of the taluk were handled by two District Munsifs’ courts located in Thaliparamba and Chovva. Due to its geographical location in the southern part of the taluk, Edakkad was traditionally served by the Chovva court.

=== Sree Oorpazhachi Kavu ===
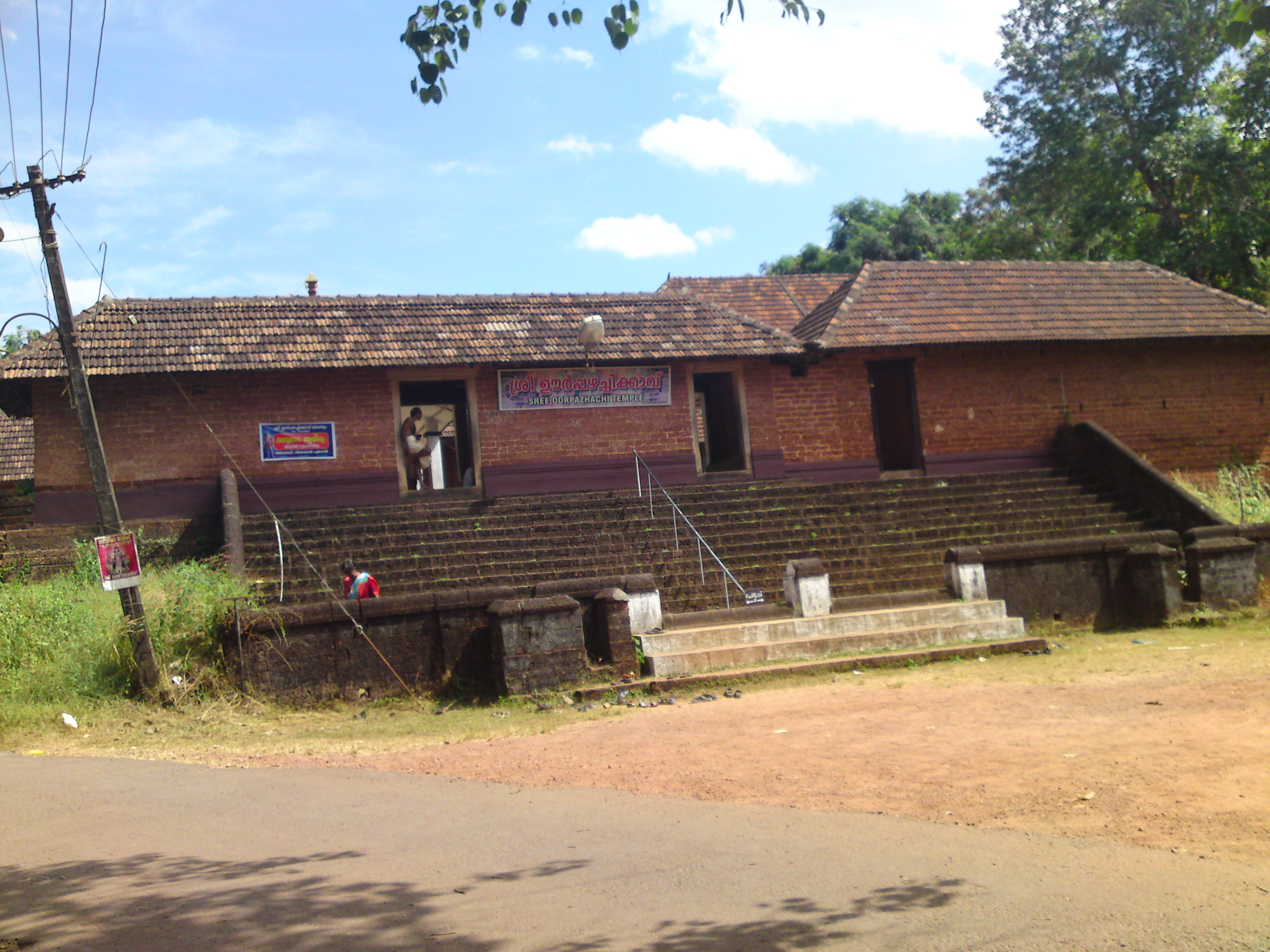
Oorpazhachi Kavu

A prominent temple in the Edakkad grama panchayat is the Sree Oorpazhachi Kavu (Ooril Pazhakiya Eachil Kavu or Ooril Pazhakiya Achi Kavu) situated at Nadal. The name of this temple renders itself to two etymological interpretations. The former meaning pazhakiya (ancient) kavu (grove) surrounded by Eachil (a herb) and the latter meaning pazhakiya (ancient) achi (mother goddess) kavu (grove). Irrespective of the interpretation of Oorpazachi Kavu, it is the presence of this temple at Edakkad that imparts historical significance to the area. One finds reference to this famous temple in the Malabar Manual by William Logan, the British collector of Malabar. The main deity at Oorpazhachikavu is Oorpazhachi Dhaivam locally known as 'dhaivathareeswaran' who was the deified feudal Nair warrior 'Meloor Dayarappan'. North Malabar Folklore has in its collection of traditional songs described the ferocity of Meloor Dayarappan as the 'veeran' [hero] who had killed sixty four within the age of thirtysix including his teacher who beat him during teaching even when Meloor Dayarappan was a boy. The lengthy lore known as 'Oorpazhachi Thottam' further narrates that Meloor Dayarappan with his dearest friend Vettakorumakan and twelve thousand friends resided at Oorpazhachi Kaav where Meloor Dayarappan ruled as a kshathriya king for twelve years over a territory extending from ancient Kannur to Wayanad.Meloor dayarappan, Khshethrapalan, Veerabhadran, and Vettakorumakan were deified nair warriors who were friends. They occupy place among the thirty five important 'Theyyams' known collectively as 'Muppathaivar' [The thirtyfive] in the Theyyam FolkLore of northernmost Malabar.

=== Ooralar ===
In the pre-British era and to some extent through the British era local political and judicial administrations were performed through hereditary village assemblies and temple committees called Ooralar. The term Oor means village and Ooraalan (Ooraalar, if joint partnership) means master (masters) or proprietor in these villages. The Sree Oorpazachi Kavu temple was the seat of such a socio-political body that enjoyed partial autonomy and administered the region. Nine prominent Nambiar families were Ooraalar and constituted the village and temple assembly that arbitrated local administration. They belonged to a further endogamous denomination among Nambiars called Randu Illam Vargam (As they derive their ancestry from Mullapalli Illom and Velloor Illom).

After the Land Reforms Ordinance was enacted by Kerala State Government and the breaking of Janmi- kudiyan (feudal tenancy relationship) system Sree Oorpazhachi Kavu and the Ooralar families do not have any socio-political influence in the area. However the eldest-male from these matrilineal families still perform their role as de facto Ooralar in the Sree Oorpazhachi Kavu temple administration during ceremonial events. Like most villages in Malabar, Edakkad has also suffered extensively during the invasion of Tipu Sultan.

=== Edakkad Bathakka ===
Traditionally the Edakkad area was famous for its local variety / landrace of watermelon (Citrullus lanatus, Family Cucurbitaceae) referred to as Edakkad Bathakka.

== Demographics ==
This grama panchayat has a mixed population of the Hindus (mainly Thiyyas and Nambiars) and a minority Muslim population.

== Transportation ==
The road to the east connects to Mysore and Bangalore and South connects to Thiruvananthapuram via Calicut - Thrissure - Cochin and Alappuzha. The nearest railway station is Thalassery and Kannur Main on Mangalore-Palakkad line (NH 66). There are airports at Kannur, Calicut and Mangalore International Airport.

== Temples ==
Apart from the Sree oorpazachi Kavu and Edakkadappan temples Sree Ganapathy temple in the west of Edakkad and Indery Ambalam near Edakkad bazaar are other popular destinations of Hindu worship. There is also an ancient mosque at Edakkad bazaar. The panchayat also has a Saliya-theruvu (weaver's street) where traditional weaving is still performed in several households to date.

One of the most famous sree Balabhadra worshiped temple named sree poothrikovil temple is also positioned in the same jurisdiction which is the second temple in India of the same lord.

== Educational institutions ==
1. There are two primary schools at Edakkad. There are secondary schools at Kadachira and Thottada (within Edakkad Block).

2. Govt. Polytechnic college is situated in Thottada. This college is under the department of technical education of Kerala and has different branches such as Civil, Mechanical, Electrical, Electronics, textile and Wood technology. The Diploma is awarded by Technical education Board, Kerala.

3. The Edakkad block also has one prestigious industrial training institute under state government.

== Politics ==
Edakkad is part of Kannur Assembly constituency and Kannur Lok Sabha constituency.

== See also ==
- Edakkad Assembly constituency
