= Neerchal, Kannur =

Neerchal
- Neighborhood
- Interactive map of Neerchal
- Coordinates: 11°51′28″N 75°23′07″E
- Country: India
- State: Kerala
- District: Kannur

Government
  - Body: Kannur Municipal Corporation

Languages
  - Official: Malayalam, English
- Time zone: UTC+5:30 (IST)
- ISO 3166 code: IN-KL
- Vehicle registration: KL-13

Neerchal is a residential neighborhood in Kannur city, Kannur District of Kerala state, India. It is part of Kannur Municipal Corporation, located 3 km (1.9 mi) from Kannur railway station.

The area has been linked to Jihadi and Kashmir terrorist recruitment and training activity.
