= Kannur South railway station =

Railway station in Kerala, India

Kannur South (junction)

General information
- Location: Kannur, Kannur, Kerala; India
- Coordinates: 11.8668307°N 75.400277°E
- System: Regional rail, light rail & commuter rail station
- Owner: Indian Railways
- Operator: Southern Railway zone
- Line: Shoranur–Mangalore line
- Platforms: 2
- Tracks: 4

Construction
- Structure type: standard (on-ground service)
- Parking: Available

Other information
- Status: Functioning
- Station code: CS
- Zone(s): Southern Railway zone
- Division(s): Palakkad
- Fare zone: Indian Railways

History
- Opened: 1904; 122 years ago
- Rebuilt: YES
Location
- Location within India Location within Kerala

Kannur South railway station (station code: CS) is an NSG–6 category Indian railway station in Palakkad railway division of Southern Railway zone. It is a railway station in Kannur district, Kerala, and falls under the Palakkad railway division of the Southern Railway zone, Indian Railways.
