= Talap =

- Neighbourhood
- Interactive map of Talap
- Coordinates: 11°52′38″N 75°22′12″E
- Country: India
- State: Kerala
- District: Kannur

Government
  - Body: Kannur Municipal Corporation

Languages
  - Official: Malayalam, English
- Time zone: UTC+5:30 (IST)
- ISO 3166 code: IN-KL
- Vehicle registration: KL-13

Talap is a neighborhood of Kannur city on NH 66 in Kerala, India. It is part of Kannur Municipal Corporation. Although predominantly residential, Talap has several educational and health institutions in Kannur, and is noted for its temples and cultural institutions.

== Education ==
- SN Vidya Mandir Talap
- Chinmaya Balabhavan Talap
- Gem International Pre-School Talap
- Chinmaya Mission College Talap
- Wales College Of Science and Management
- Govt. UP School Talap
- A K G Memorial Co Operative College of Nursing Talap
- Govt.Talap Mixed UP School
- Chenginipadi School Talap
- Bharathiya Vidya Bhavan Talap

== Health ==
- Koyili Hospital Talap
- A.K.G Memorial Co-operative Hospital Talap
- Chaithanya Hospital, Talap
- JJ Hospital Talap
- Kripa Nursing Home Talap
- MAKS International Institute of Medical Sciences Talap
- Madhavrao Scindia Ravu Hospital Talap
- Fathima Hospital Talap
- KIMST Hospital Talap
- KVM Ayurvedic hospital talap
- Asha lab
- Dr. P Mahesh scanning centre Talap
- Regional public health laboratory Talap kannur
- Ceyem Medilab Talap
- Jeeva medical lab Talap
- Metropolis Healthcare

== Religion ==
- Talap Shree Sundareswara Temple
- Talap Juma Masjid
- CSI Church
- Olachery Kavu Talap

== Gallery ==
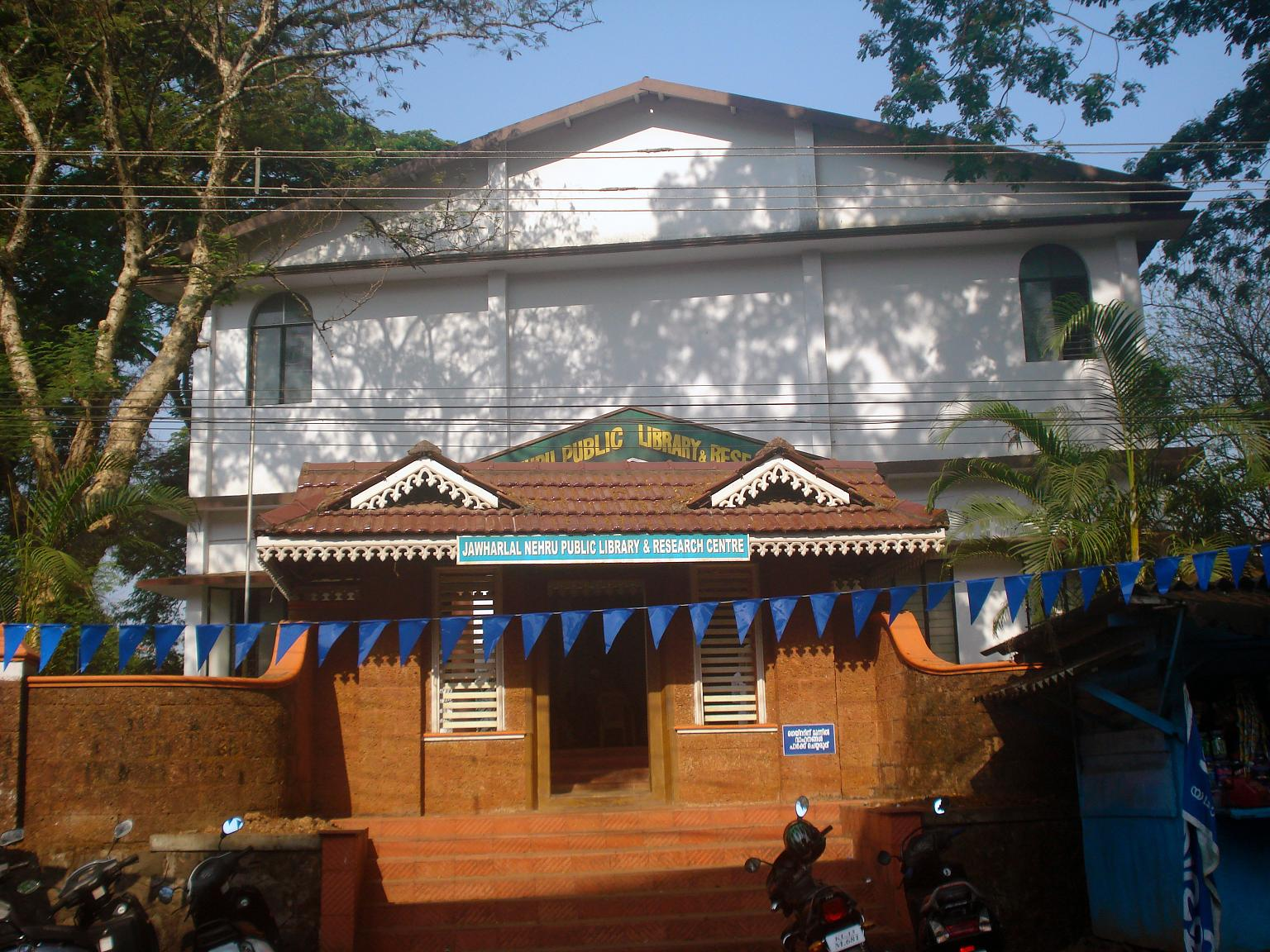
Nehru Library, Yogashala Road
