= Kakkad, Kannur =

Kakkad Kakkad, Kannur
- Neighborhood
- Interactive map of Kakkad
- Coordinates: 11°53′00″N 75°23′00″E
- Country: India
- State: Kerala
- District: Kannur

Government
  - Body: Kannur Municipal Corporation

Languages
  - Official: Malayalam, English
- Time zone: UTC+5:30 (IST)
- PIN: 670005
- ISO 3166 code: IN-KL
- Vehicle registration: KL-13
- Lok Sabha constituency: Kannur
- Vidhan Sabha constituency: Azhikode

Kakkad is a residential neighborhood of Kannur city in the Indian state of Kerala. It is located 4 km from Kannur city centre, at an average elevation of 18 metres above the sea level.
