= Kannur Municipal Corporation =

Local civic body in Kannur, Kerala, India

Kannur Municipal Corporation കണ്ണൂർ നഗരസഭ
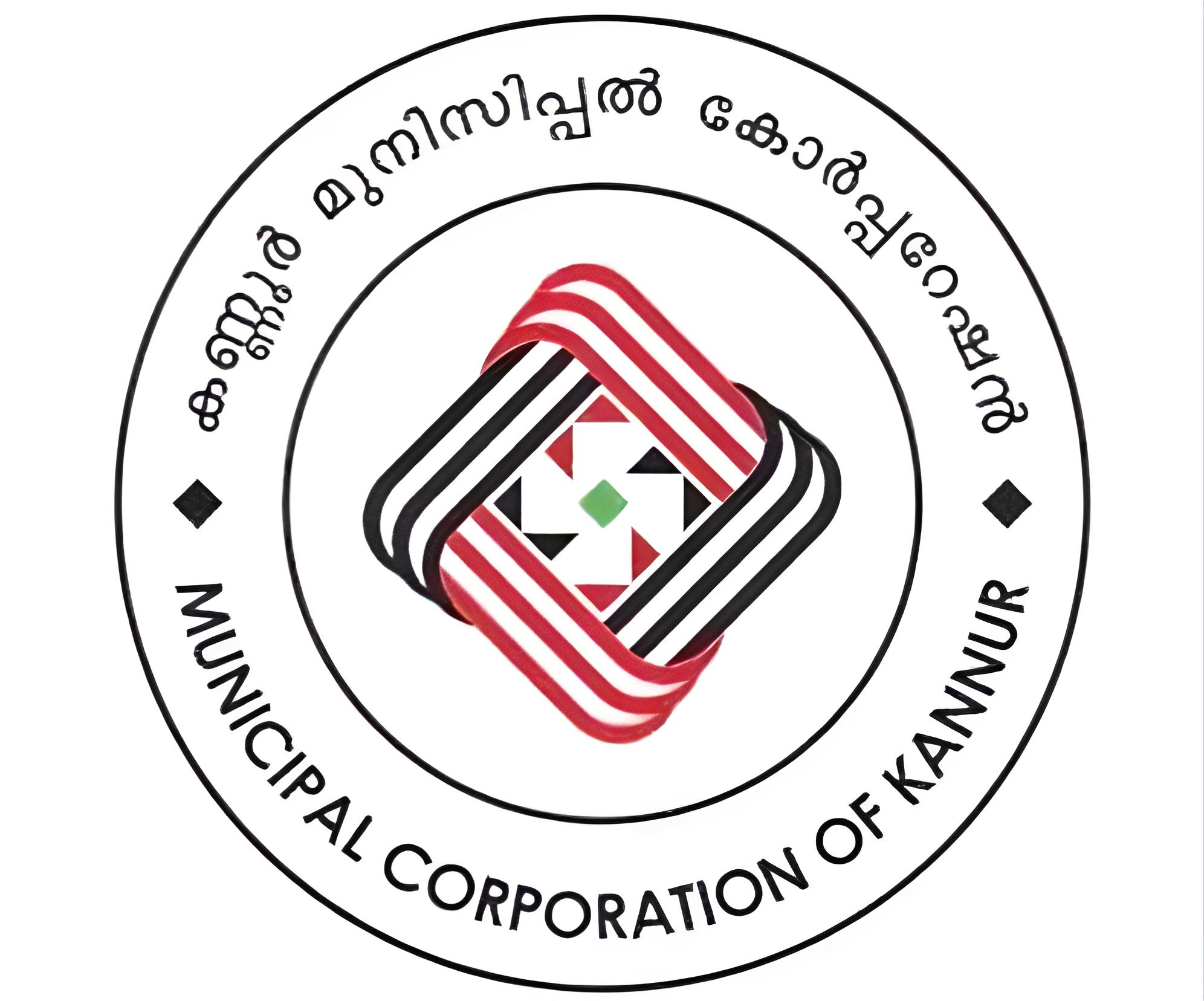
- Emblem of Kannur Municipal Corporation

Type
- Type: Municipal Corporation of Kannur
- Term limits: None

History
- Founded: 2015
- Preceded by: Kannur Municipality

Leadership
- Mayor: Adv.P.Indira, INC
- Deputy Mayor: K.P.Tahir, IUML
- Municipal Corporation Secretary: D. Saju

Structure
- Seats: 56
- Political groups: Government (36) UDF (36): INC (21); IUML (15); Official Opposition (15): CPI(M) (15); Other Opposition (5): BJP (4); SDPI (1)
- Committees: Finance Standing Committee; Development Standing Committee; Welfare Standing Committee; Health Standing Committee; Public Works Standing Committee; Town Planning Standing Committee; Tax Appeal Standing Committee; Education & Sports Standing Committee
- Length of term: 5 years

Elections
- Voting system: First-past-the-post
- Last election: 2020
- Next election: 11 December 2025

Meeting place
- Corporation Office, Kannur

Website
- kannurcorporation.lsgkerala.gov.in/en

The Kannur Municipal Corporation is the municipal corporation that administers the city of Kannur, Kerala. Established in 2015, the Corporation's first mayor was E. P. Latha. Kannur Corporation has two assembly constituencies – Kannur Assembly constituency and Azhikode Assembly constituency – both of which are part of the Kannur parliamentary constituency. The Corporation is headed by a Mayor and council, and manages 78.35 km^{2} of Kannur city, with a population of about 232,486 within that area. Kannur Municipal Corporation has been formed with functions to improve the infrastructure of town.

== History ==
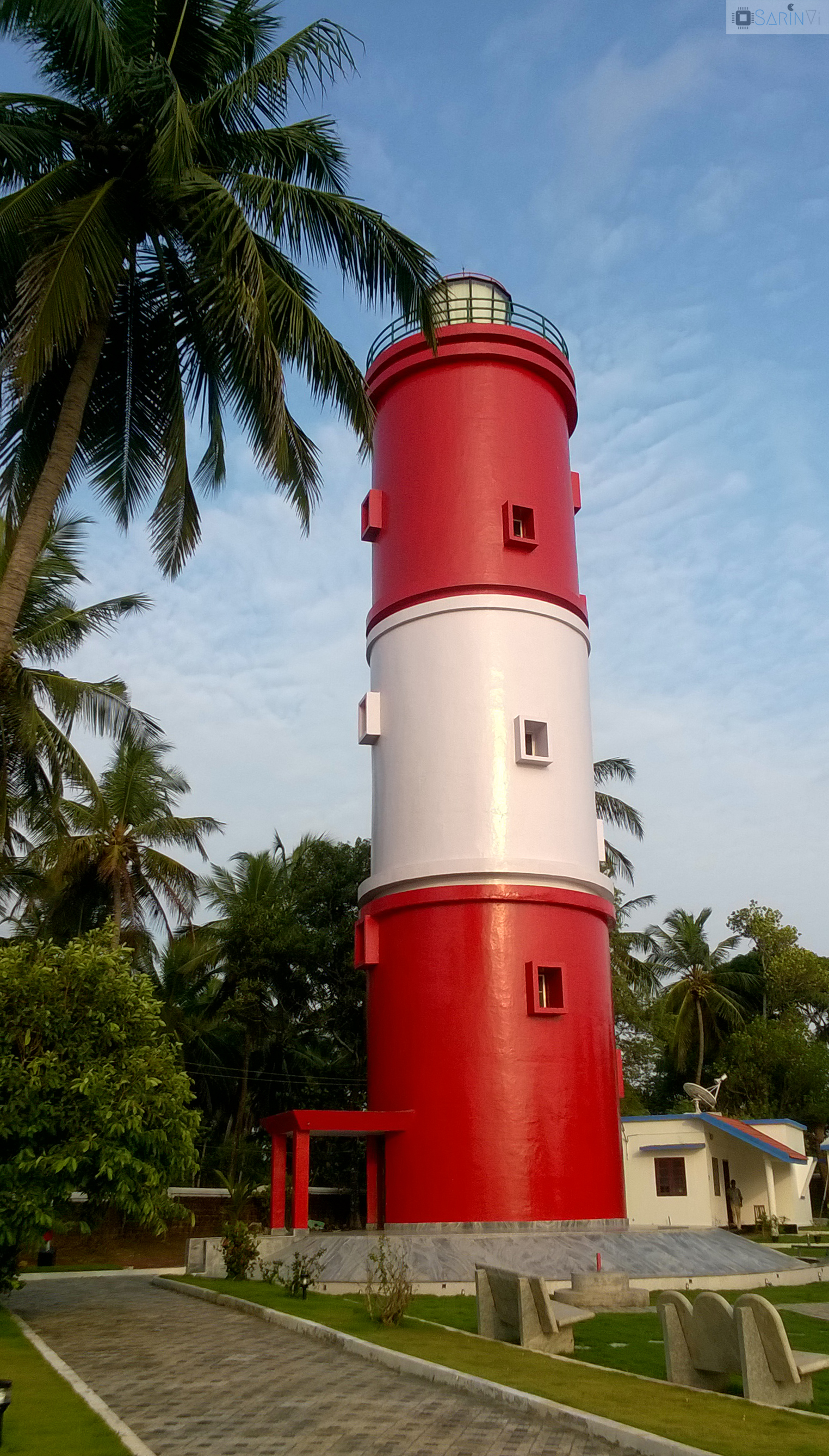
Kannur Lighthouse

The ancient port of Naura, which is mentioned in the Periplus of the Erythraean Sea as a port somewhere north of Muziris is identified with Kannur. Ezhimala was the headquarters of a powerful kingdom who later became Mushika dynasty in the ancient period. Kannur was an important trading centre in the 12th century, with active business connections with Persia and Arabia. In his book on travels (Il Milione), Marco Polo recounts his visit to the area in the mid 1290s. Other visitors included Faxian, the Buddhist pilgrim and Ibn Batuta, writer and historian of Tangiers. Kannur was the capital city of Kolathunadu, one of the four powerful kingdoms who ruled Kerala during the medieval period.

The arrival of Portuguese at Kappad, Kozhikode in 1498 during the Age of Discovery, opened a direct sea route from Europe to India. The St. Angelo Fort at Kannur was built in 1505 by Dom Francisco de Almeida, the first Portuguese Viceroy of India. The Dutch captured the fort from the Portuguese in 1663. They modernized the fort and built the bastions Hollandia, Zeelandia, and Frieslandia, which are major features of the present structure. The original Portuguese fort was pulled down later. A painting of this fort and the fishing ferry behind it can be seen in the Rijksmuseum Amsterdam. The Dutch sold the fort to the king Ali Raja of Arakkal in 1772.

During the 17th century, Kannur was the capital city of the only Muslim Sultanate in the Malabar region - Arakkal. Arakkal Kingdom and Chirakkal kingdom were two vassal kingdoms based in the city of Kannur. The Ali Rajas of Arakkal kingdom, near Kannur, who were the vassals of the Kolathiri, ruled over the Lakshadweep islands. The island of Dharmadom near Kannur, along with Thalassery, was ceded to the East India Company as early as 1734, which were claimed by all of the Kolattu Rajas, Kottayam Rajas, and Arakkal Bibi in the late medieval period, where the British initiated a factory and English settlement following the cession. The British conquered the fort Kannur in 1790 and used it as one of their major military stations on the Malabar Coast. During the British Raj, Kannur was part of the Madras presidency in the Malabar District. It served as the British military headquarters on India's west coast until 1887. Kannur Cantonment is the only cantonment board in Kerala.

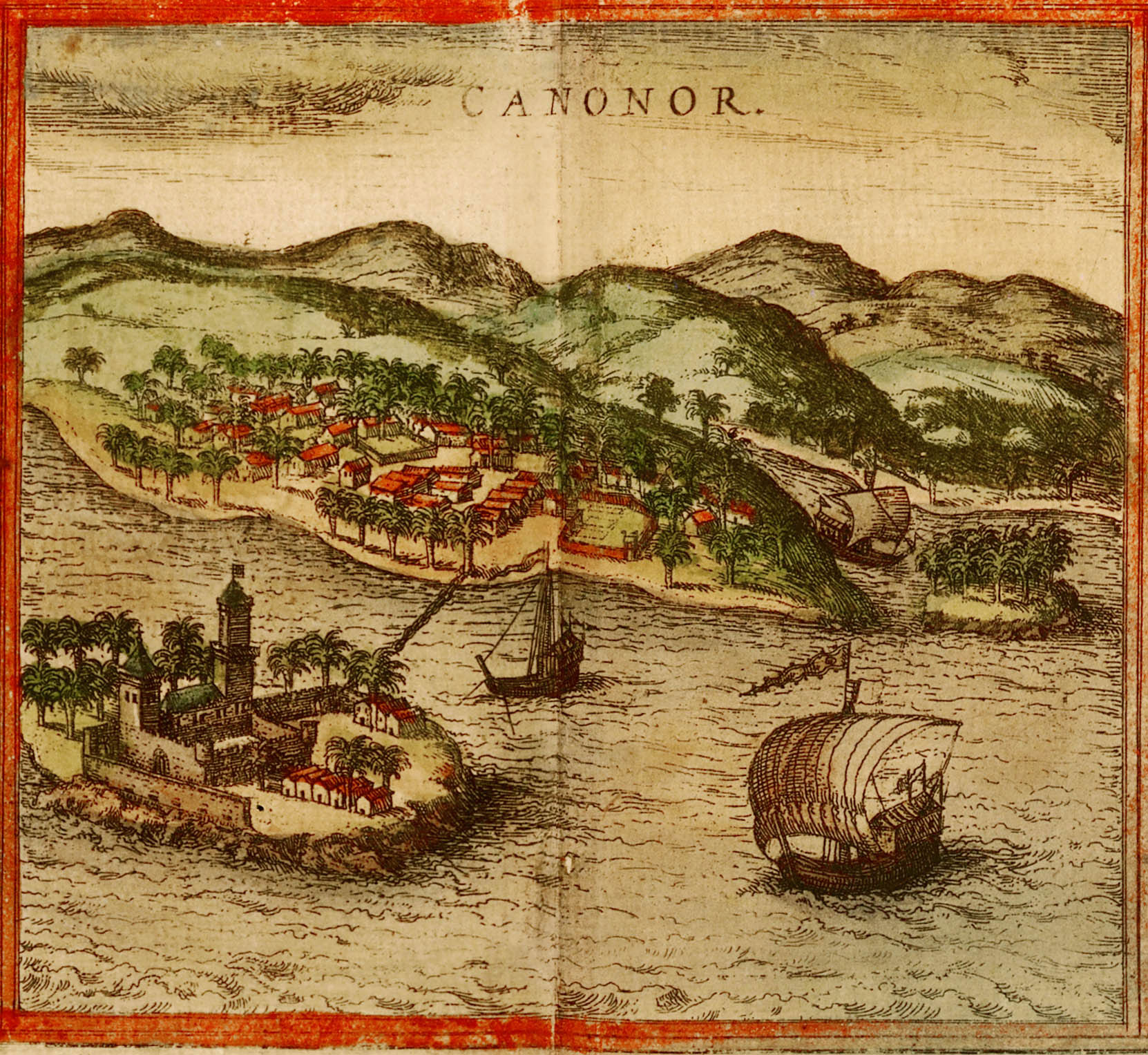
A portrait of Kannur drawn in 1572, from Georg Braun and Frans Hogenberg's atlas Civitates orbis terrarum, Volume I

Kannur municipality was formed on 1 November 1866 according to the Madras Act 10 of 1865 (Amendment of the Improvements in Towns act 1850) of the British Indian Empire, making it the second oldest municipality in the state. The Kannur Municipal Corporation was created by merging the erstwhile Municipality of Kannur, and Panchayats of Pallikunnu, Puzhathi, Edakkad, Elayavoor, and Chelora in 2015.

== Revenue sources ==
The following are the Income sources for the Corporation from the Central and State Government.

=== Revenue from taxes ===
Following is the Tax related revenue for the corporation.

- Property tax.
- Profession tax.
- Entertainment tax.
- Grants from Central and State Government like Goods and Services Tax.
- Advertisement tax.

=== Revenue from non-tax sources ===
Following is the Non Tax related revenue for the corporation.

- Water usage charges.
- Fees from Documentation services.
- Rent received from municipal property.
- Funds from municipal bonds.

== Structure ==
The Mayor is the elected head of the Kannur Municipal Corporation, assisted by a Deputy Mayor. Both are elected from among the councillors for a five-year term. The Corporation functions through six standing committees such as Finance, Development, Health, Education and Sports, Tax Appeal, Town Planning, and Welfare. Councillors are elected from wards and form the council, which elects the Mayor, Deputy Mayor, and standing committee chairpersons. Each council has a five year term and election occurs in every five years.

The administrative wing is headed by the Corporation Secretary, appointed by the Government of Kerala, and assisted by an Additional Secretary and other government-appointed officers. The secretary is tasked with implementing council decisions and its administrative functions.

=== Divisions (Wards) ===
For effective representation and administration, the Kannur Municipal Corporation is divided into 56 wards, each represented by an elected councillor. Voters in each ward of the Kannur Municipal Corporation elect their councillor every five years.

== Current Members of the Corporation ==
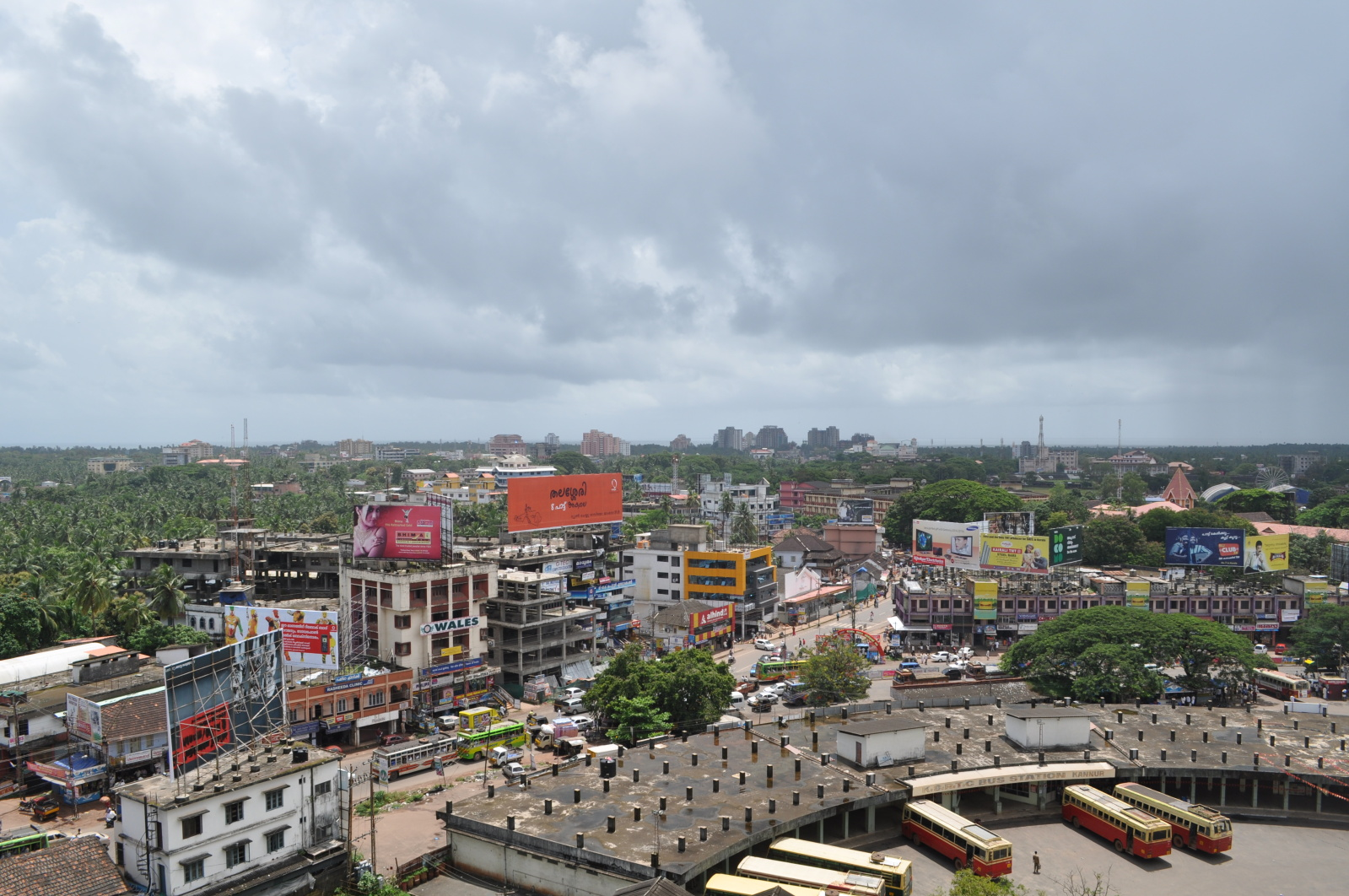
Skyline of Kannur city

The following is a list of the councillors of Kannur Corporation for the 2025–2030 term, as elected in the 2025 local body election.

Mayor: Adv.P.Indira
Deputy Mayor: K.P.Tahir
Ward Details		Councillor	Party	Alliance	Remarks
No.	Name	Councillor	Party	Alliance	Remarks
1	Palliyammoola	Deepa P.	Indian National Congress	UDF	
2	Kunnav	K. Seetha	Communist Party of India (Marxist)	LDF	
3	Kokkenpara	P. Mahesh	Bharatiya Janata Party	NDA	
4	Pallikunnu	Deepthi Vinod	Bharatiya Janata Party	NDA	
5	Thalappu	T. P. Jamal	Indian Union Muslim League	UDF	
6	Udayamkunnu	Anoop Balan	Indian National Congress	UDF	
7	Podikundu	V. Purushothaman	Communist Party of India (Marxist)	LDF	
8	Kottali	Usha Kumari K.	Indian National Congress	UDF	
9	Athazhakunnu	Sreeja K.	Indian National Congress	UDF	
10	Kakkadu	Shabeer Kunjipally	Indian Union Muslim League	UDF	
11	Thulicheri	Majesh A. K.	Bharatiya Janata Party	NDA	
12	Kakkadu North	Zubair Kichiri	Indian Union Muslim League	UDF	
13	Shadulipalli	Muhammad Ali V.K.	Indian Union Muslim League	UDF	
14	Pallipram	Arshad A.	Indian Union Muslim League	UDF	
15	Varam	K. P. Tahir	Indian Union Muslim League	UDF	Deputy Mayor
16	Valiyannoor	K. Suma	Indian National Congress	UDF	
17	Chelora	K. Saraswathi	Communist Party of India (Marxist)	LDF	
18	Macheri	A. Pramila	Indian National Congress	UDF	
19	Pallippoyil	M. Rafeeq	Indian National Congress	UDF	
20	Kappadu	C. C. Gangadharan	Communist Party of India (Marxist)	LDF	
21	Elayavoor North	Bismillah Bibi	Indian Union Muslim League	UDF	
22	Elayavoor South	Vijina K. K.	Communist Party of India (Marxist)	LDF	
23	Mundayad	Sreeja Madathil	Indian National Congress	UDF	
24	Edachovva	T. Pradeep	Indian National Congress	UDF	
25	Athirakam	K. T. Murshid	Indian Union Muslim League	UDF	
26	Kappicheri	Nijesh O. V.	Communist Party of India (Marxist)	LDF	
27	Melechovva	Dr.K. C. Vatsala	Communist Party of India (Marxist)	LDF	
28	Thazhechovva	E. Sunila	Communist Party of India (Marxist)	LDF	
29	Keezhuthalli	Seena K. P.	Indian National Congress	UDF	
30	Thilanoor	V. K. Prakashini	Communist Party of India (Marxist)	LDF	
31	Attadappa	M. Priya	Communist Party of India (Marxist)	LDF	
32	Chala	P. K. Preetha	Indian National Congress	UDF	
33	Edakkadu	Prashant T.	Communist Party of India (Marxist)	LDF	
34	Ezhara	Faslim T. P.	Indian Union Muslim League	UDF	
35	Alingeel	Adv.Sona Jayaram	Indian National Congress	UDF	
36	Keezhunna	Sruthi K. P.	Indian National Congress	UDF	
37	Thottada	Sunila P.	Communist Party of India (Marxist)	LDF	
38	Adikadalayi	Rijil Chandran Makkutti.	Indian National Congress	UDF	
39	Kanhira	Manjusha P.	Communist Party of India (Marxist)	LDF	
40	Kuruva	A. Mithran	Indian National Congress	UDF	
41	Padanna	Shamima Teacher	Indian Union Muslim League	UDF	
42	Vethilapalli	Muhammad Shibil K. K.	Indian National Congress	UDF	
43	Neerchal	Nizami C.	Indian Union Muslim League	UDF	
44	Arakkal	Sameera K.	Social Democratic Party of India	None	
45	Chovva	M. P. Anilkumar	Communist Party of India (Marxist)	LDF	
46	Thana	Risham Thana.	Indian Union Muslim League	UDF	
47	South Bazar	E. Bina	Communist Party of India (Marxist)	LDF	
48	Temple	Adv.Archana Vandichal	Bharatiya Janata Party	NDA	
49	Thayatheru	Adv.Lisha Deepak	Indian National Congress	UDF	
50	Kazanakotta	Sahad M.	Indian Union Muslim League	UDF	
51	Ayikkara	Sirajuddin M.	Indian Union Muslim League	UDF	
52	Kanathoor	Reshma Vinod	Indian National Congress	UDF	
53	Payyambalam	Adv.P. Indira	Indian National Congress	UDF	Mayor
54	Thalikkavu	Ajith Parakkandi	Indian National Congress	UDF	
55	Chalad	Rafna C. V.	Indian Union Muslim League	UDF	
56	Panjikayil	Umeshan K.	Indian National Congress	UDF	

== Election results ==
=== Corporation Election 2025 ===
S.No.	Party name	Party symbol	Number of Corporators	Change	Map
1.	UDF		36	▲2	
2.	LDF		15	▼4	
3.	BJP		04	▲3	
4.	IND		01	Steady	

=== Corporation Election 2020 ===
S.No.	Party name	Party symbol	Number of Corporators	Change
1.	UDF		34	▲7
2.	LDF		19	▼7
3.	BJP		01	Steady
4.	IND		01	Steady

=== Kannur Municipal Corporation Election 2015 ===
Kannur Municipal Corporation Election 2015
S.No.	Party name	Party symbol	Number of Councillors
01	UDF		27
02	LDF		27
03	Independents		01

== Mayors of Kannur ==
Mayors of Kannur
From	Until	Incumbent	Party
November 2015	September 2019	E. P. Latha	Communist Party of India (Marxist)
September 2019	July 2020	Suma Balakrishnan	Indian National Congress
July 2020	December 2020	C. Seenath	Indian Union Muslim League
December 2020	December 2023	T.O Mohanan	Indian National Congress
December 2023	December 2025	Muslih Madathil	Indian Union Muslim League
December 2025	Incumbent	P. Indira	Indian National Congress

== Deputy Mayors ==
Deputy Mayors of Kannur
From	Until	Incumbent	Party
November 2015	December 2020	P. K. Ragesh	Independent
December 2020	December 2025	K. Shabeena	Indian Union Muslim League
December 2025	Incumbent	K.P Thahir	Indian Union Muslim League
