= N Ramakrishnan =

Indian politician (1941–2012)

N. Ramakrishnan

N Ramakrishnan (13 March 1941 – 1 October 2012) was an Indian politician, affiliated to the Indian National Congress. He served as the state Labour Minister in the Government of Kerala from 1991 to 1995.

== Early life ==
He was born at Anjarakkandy, Kannur, Kerala on 13 March 1941 to M. K. Raghavan and N. Narayani. He was the eldest of their four children.

== Political career ==
Ramakrishnan's political career started as a trade unions activist among beedi workers. He organised the beedi workers under Indian National Trade Union Congress (INTUC). In 1967 he was elected as Youth Congress State Secretary. He was first elected to the Kerala legislative assembly in 1970 from Edakkad constituency of Kerala. He became Kannur DCC President in the year 1971 and went on to serve as the DCC president for 18 years. He was again elected to the Kerala legislative assembly in 1991 and became a minister in K. Karunakaran's cabinet.

He also served as Kerala Pradesh Congress Committee – General Secretary, Chairman of Kerala Handloom Development Corporation, Member of the Small Scale Industries Board, Chairman of Kannur Municipality and Chairman of Chamber of Municipal Chairpersons.

== Death ==
Ramakrishnan died on 1 October 2012 after prolonged illness at a private hospital in Mangalore. He is survived by his wife C. Jayalakshmi, a son, and two daughters. One of his daughters, Amritha Ramakrishnan is currently active in Kerala politics.
