= Chelora =

- Census Town/Suburb
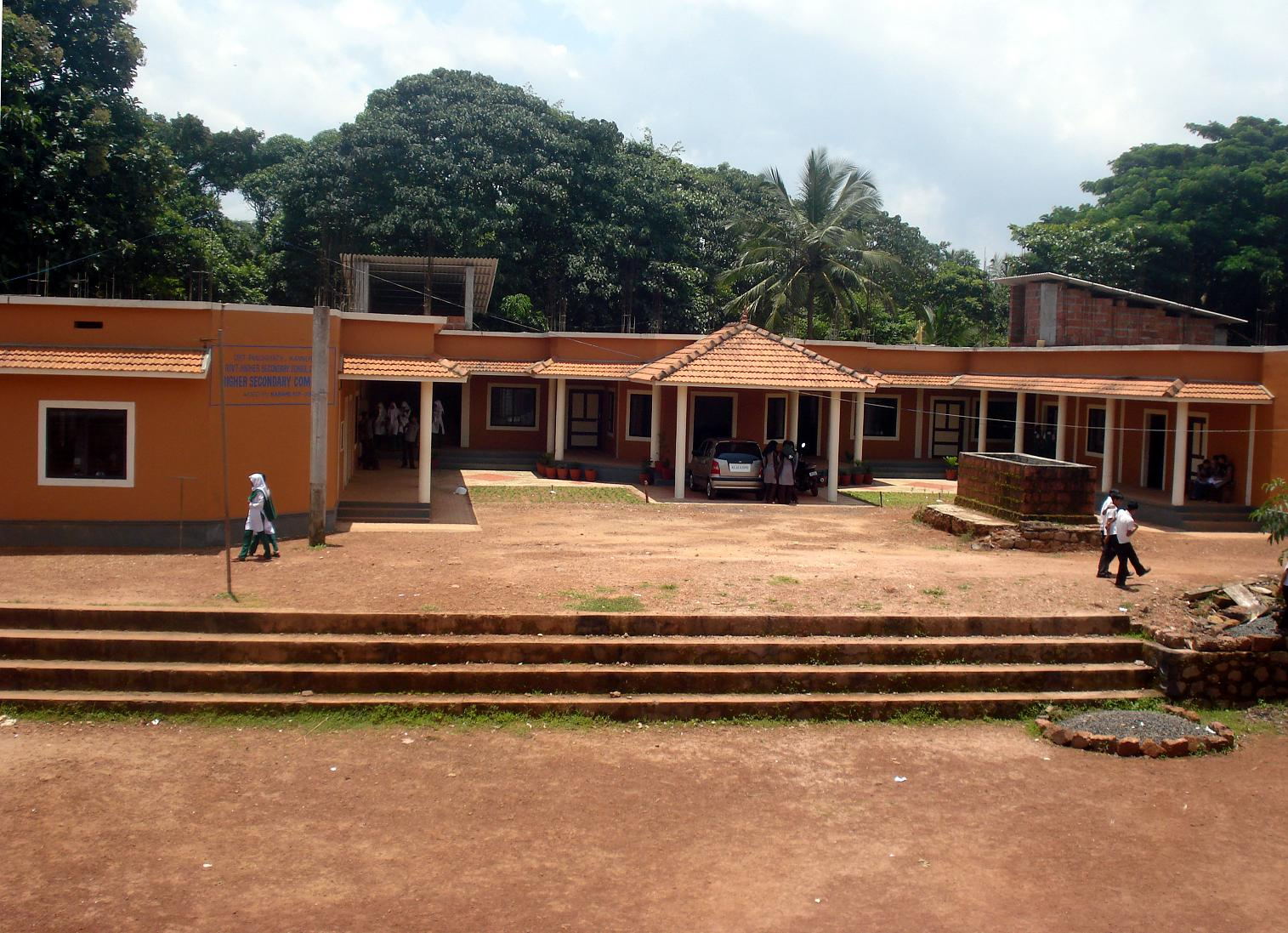
- Chelora School
- Interactive map of Chelora
- Coordinates: 11°53′42″N 75°26′23″E
- Country: India
- State: Kerala
- District: Kannur

Government
  - Body: Kannur Municipal Corporation

Population (2011)
  - Total: 36,500

Languages
  - Official: Malayalam, English
- Time zone: UTC+5:30 (IST)
- PIN: 670006
- Telephone code: 0497272
- ISO 3166 code: IN-KL
- Vehicle registration: KL 13

Chelora is a census town and suburb of Kannur city in Kannur district in the state of Kerala, India. It is located about 10 km (6.2 mi) east of Kannur city and 18 km (11 mi) west of Kannur International Airport, and lies on the Kannur-Mysore Highway.

Kadakkara Sri Dharmasastha Temple and Valannur Sri Risheishwara Temple are the two temples that attract people to the town. Chelora Govt Higher Secondary School is a local educational institution. Kappad, Valannur, Mathukoth, Peringalayi and Konganamkott Para are among the major localities in Chelora.

== Administration ==
The area is administered by the Kannur Municipal Corporation. The corporation's zonal office is situated at Mathukoth.

== Accessibility ==
The Kannur Central Bus Terminal and Kannur Railway Station are situated at a distance of 10.3 km away from Chelora. Presently there is no railway lines passing through Chelora. But, easily available private buses makes Chelora accessible. Chelora can be reached by a bus to Iritty, Mattannur and Anjarakandy towns from Kannur. The bus-stop point of Chelora is commonly known as Mathukkoth. Chelora can be reached via Kappad also. (Kappad in Kannur district).

== Landmarks ==
- Chelora Govt. Higher Secondary School.
- PHC Chelora, Mathukoth.
- Kannur corporation zonal office, Mathukoth.
- Kadakkara Sri Dharmasastha Kshetram
- Valannur Rishieswara Kshetram
- Chelora Jumamasjid
- E K Nayanar center
- A K G CLUB
- A K G Memorial Vayanashala and Grandalayam
- Sreerosh Green Acres
- CK complex (shopping complex)
- Mini industrial estate
- Mandot Sree Mahavshnu Kshetram

== Demographics ==
As of 2011 India census, Chelora had a population of 36,500. Males constitute 48% of the population and females 52%. Chelora has an average literacy rate of 85%, higher than the national average of 59.5%; with male literacy of 87% and female literacy of 84%. 11% of the population is under 6 years of age.

- Number of residential buildings : 8000
- Number of Educational Institutions : 18
- Pre primary education centres : 35
