= Sham (name) =

Sham is a name which is used as a surname and a given name. Notable people with the name include:

== Surname ==
- Aristo Sham (born 1996), Hong Kong pianist
- Brad Sham (born 1949), American sportscaster
- Fitri Sham (born 1994), Malaysian cricketer
- Jimmy Sham (born 1987), Hong Kong activist
- Lu Jeu Sham (born 1938), American physicist
- Pak Sham, Hong Kong psychiatric geneticist
- Shirley Sham (born 1994), Chinese beauty pageant

== Given name ==
- Sham Singh Atariwala (1790–1846), Sikh warrior
- Sham Kakade, American computer scientist
- Sham Khamis (born 1995), Australian soccer player,
- Sham Lal, multiple people
- Sham Maskari, Omani singer
- Sham Raj, multiple people
