= Shama (name) =

Shama may refer to:

== Given names ==
- Shama Tatler, Baroness Shah (born 1983), British politician
- Shama Zaidi (born 1938), Indian writer

== Surnames ==
- Abu Shama (1203–1267), Arab historian

== See also ==
- Shama (disambiguation)
- Shamaa (disambiguation)
- Shamma (disambiguation)
