= Sham =

Sham may refer to:

== Arabic use ==
- Al-Sham or Shām (شام), the Arabic term for the Greater Syria region
  - Bilad al-Sham, the Caliphate province of the same region
  - Jund al-Sham, militant group based in Afghanistan, meaning "Army of Syria"
- Sham el-Nessim, Egyptian holiday marking the beginning of spring
- Sham, or Alsham, the Arabic name for the star Alpha Sagittae

== English use ==
- Fraud
  - Sham drug as a quack remedy
  - Sham election, another name for a show election
  - Sham marriage, a marriage entered into with intent to deceive
  - Sham peer review, a fraudulent or malicious form of peer review
- Hoax
- Placebo, any drug, surgery, or other treatment with intentional (and usually blinded) lack of efficacy
  - Sham drug as a placebo used in a single- or double-blinded control group of experiments (see treatment and control groups)
  - Sham surgery, surgery omitting the therapeutic component, performed in the single-blinded control group of experiments
- Name of a person or group of people:
  - Sam the Sham (born 1937), stage name of U.S. rock singer Domingo “Sam” Samudio
  - Sham, nickname of Art Shamsky (born 1941), American Major League Baseball outfielder and Israel Baseball League manager
  - Sham 69, English punk band
- Title of a work of art
  - Sham (1921 film), a lost 1921 silent film based on a Broadway play starring Ethel Clayton
  - Sham (2025 film)
  - Sham (play), a 1920 one-act stage play by Frank G. Tompkins
- Other uses
  - Sham, a name for the cover of a pillow
  - SHAM, salicylhydroxamic acid, a drug that works against urinary tract infections

== Chinese use ==
- Kohn–Sham equations, named after Walter Kohn and Lu Jeu Sham
- Sham Chun River, on the border of Hong Kong and mainland China
- Sham Shui Po District, a district of Hong Kong
- Sham Kwok Fai (born 1984), association football player from Hong Kong

== Other uses ==
- Sham (name), list of people with the name
- Sham (horse), American Thoroughbred horse born in 1970 who won multiple graded stakes races
  - Sham Stakes, a race named for the horse
- Sham, Iran
- Sham, a character in the X-Men 2099 comic book series
- Sham Pain, a single by American heavy metal band Five Finger Death Punch from And Justice For None
- Southern Hemisphere Annular Mode (SHAM), a climate pattern

== See also ==
- Shaam (disambiguation)
- Shama (disambiguation)
- Shyama (disambiguation)
- Shams (disambiguation)
- Syria (disambiguation)
- Shyam or Sham, an Indian male given name
