= Ladka Ladki =

Romantic comedy Bollywood movie

- Directed by: Som Haksar
- Produced by: Hargovind Duggal
- Starring: Kishore Kumar; Mumtaz; I. S. Johar; Tun Tun; Raj Mehra; Shyamlal
- Music by: Madan Mohan
- Production company: Bright Films
- Release date: 1966
- Country: India
- Language: Hindi

Ladka Ladki is a 1966 Indian romantic comedy film directed by Som Haksar and starring Kishore Kumar, Mumtaz and Tun Tun and I. S. Johar.

In 2024 Kishore Kumar's dialogue in this film Chin Tapak Dam Dam trend on social media.

== Cast ==
- Kishore Kumar
- Mumtaz
- Laxmi Chhaya
- Sujit Kumar
- Bhagwan Dada
- Raj Mehra
- I. S. Johar
- Tun Tun
- Leela Mishra
- Randhir

== Soundtrack ==
No.	Title	Singer(s)	Length
1.	"Ankhon Ko Meri"	Asha Bhosle, Mahendra Kapoor	5:29
2.	"Seekh Lo Seekh Lo"	Kishore Kumar, Usha Mangeshkar, Chorus	5:58
3.	"Suniye Suniye"	Kishore Kumar	3:31
