= Orthodoxy in Syria =

The term Orthodoxy in Syria may refer to:

- Eastern Orthodoxy in Syria, representing adherents, communities and institutions of various Eastern Orthodox Churches, in Syria
- Oriental Orthodoxy in Syria, representing adherents, communities and institutions of various Oriental Orthodox Churches, in Syria
- Islamic Orthodoxy in Syria, representing adherents, communities and institutions of Sunni Islam, in Syria

== See also ==
- Orthodoxy (disambiguation)
- Orthodox Church (disambiguation)
- Syria (disambiguation)
