= Shamas =

Shamas or Chamas may refer to:

- Gabbai, beadle or sexton

== Surname ==
- Herib Chamas, former football defender and coach
- Sandra Shamas, Canadian comedic actress and writer
- Samir Chamas, Lebanese actor, writer and journalist
- Mohamad Chamas, Lebanese actor
- Mohammed Shamas, Lebanese professional association football midfielder

== See also ==
- Shama (disambiguation)
- Chamas
