= Orthodox Christianity in Syria =

The term Orthodox Christianity in Syria may refer to:

- Eastern Orthodox Christianity in Syria, relating to communities and institutions of Eastern Orthodox Church, in Syria
- Oriental Orthodox Christianity in Syria, relating to communities and institutions of Oriental Orthodox Church, in Syria

== See also ==
- Orthodox Christianity (disambiguation)
- Syria (disambiguation)
