= Shyama =

Shyama may refer to:

- Shyama or Kali, the Hindu goddess
- Shyam, an epithet of the Hindu god Krishna
- Shyama (Jain monk) (c. 247 BC–151 BC), Jain monk
- Shyama (Hindi actress) (1935–2017), Indian actress in Hindi films
- Shyama (Malayalam actress) (?–1996), Indian actress in Malayalam and Tamil films
- Shama Dulari (fl. 1940s–1950s), Indian actress and dancer, often confused with the above Hindi actress
- Shyama (film), a 1986 Indian Malayalam-language film

== See also ==
- Sham (disambiguation)
- Shaam (disambiguation)
- Shama (disambiguation)
- Shyam, an Indian male given name
- Black God (disambiguation), literal translation of Shyama and Shyam
