= Shamaa (disambiguation) =

Shamaa may refer to:

- Shamaa, a village and municipality in Lebanon
- Shamaa Mohammed (1958–2022), Omani television actress
- Ghada El-Shamaa (born 1961), Syrian actress

== See also ==
- Shama (disambiguation)
- Shamma (disambiguation)
