= Shama =

Shama may refer to:

- Shama (1946 film), an Indian film
- Shama (1974 film), a Pakistani Urdu film
- Shama (magazine), an Indian Urdu-language film and literary magazine published from 1939-1999 in Delhi
- Shama (TV show), a 2011 Indian television show broadcast by DD National
- Shama (TV series), a 1976 Pakistani television series
- Shama District, Ghana
  - Shama, Ghana, capital of the district
  - Shama (Ghana parliament constituency)
- Shama language, a Kainji language of Nigeria
- Shema Yisrael, daily prayer in Judaism
- another name for Draupadi, wife of Pandavas
- Shama, fictional character in the 1960 Indian film Barsaat Ki Raat, portrayed by Shyama
- Shama, fictional character in the 2019 Indian film Notebook, portrayed by Soliha Maqbool
- the proper name of star HD 99109
- Shamas or Magpie-robins, of the genera Copsychus and Trichixos
- Shama or Samatva, a Hindu philosophy term meaning to have equal consideration or reserved judgement
- Shama (name)

== See also ==
- Shamaa (disambiguation)
- Shamma (disambiguation)
- Shema (disambiguation)
- Sham (disambiguation)
- Shaam (disambiguation)
- Shyama (disambiguation)
- Shamas (disambiguation)
