= Black God =

Black God may refer to:

- Black God (manga), a seinen manga written by Lim Dall-young
- Black God (Navajo mythology), the Navajo god of fire and creator of the stars
- Chernobog, the Slavic god of bad fate
- Krishna or Shyam (lit. 'black' in Sanskrit), a Hindu god
- Kali or Shyama (lit. 'black'), a Hindu goddess
- Karuppu Sami (lit. 'black deity'), regional Hindu go
- Black God, White Devil, a 1964 Brazilian film

== See also ==
- Shyama (disambiguation)
- Shyam, an Indian male given name
- Krishna (disambiguation)
- Kali (disambiguation)
- Black Goddess, a 1978 Nigerian-Brazilian drama film by Ola Balogun
