= Shaam (disambiguation) =

Shaam (Arabic: شَـام) often refers to the Greater Syria (region), seen from a Eurocentric perspective as "the Levant".

Shaam may also refer to:

== Places ==
- Bilad al-Shaam, a former province corresponding to the Levant
- Harrat al-Shaam, a volcanic field in the Middle East
- Sha'am, a village in Northern Ras Al Khaimah, United Arab Emirates

== Television ==
- Shaam Dhaley, 2016 Pakistani television series

== People ==
- Shaam Ibrahim (born 1977), Indian actor and model
- Mahmood Shaam (born 1940), Pakistani journalist and poet

== See also ==
- Sham (disambiguation)
- Shama (disambiguation)
- Shyama (disambiguation)
- Syria (disambiguation)
- Shyam or Sham, an Indian male given name
