= Ze'ev Erlich =

Israeli researcher (1953–2024)

- זאב חנוך (ז'אבו) ארליך
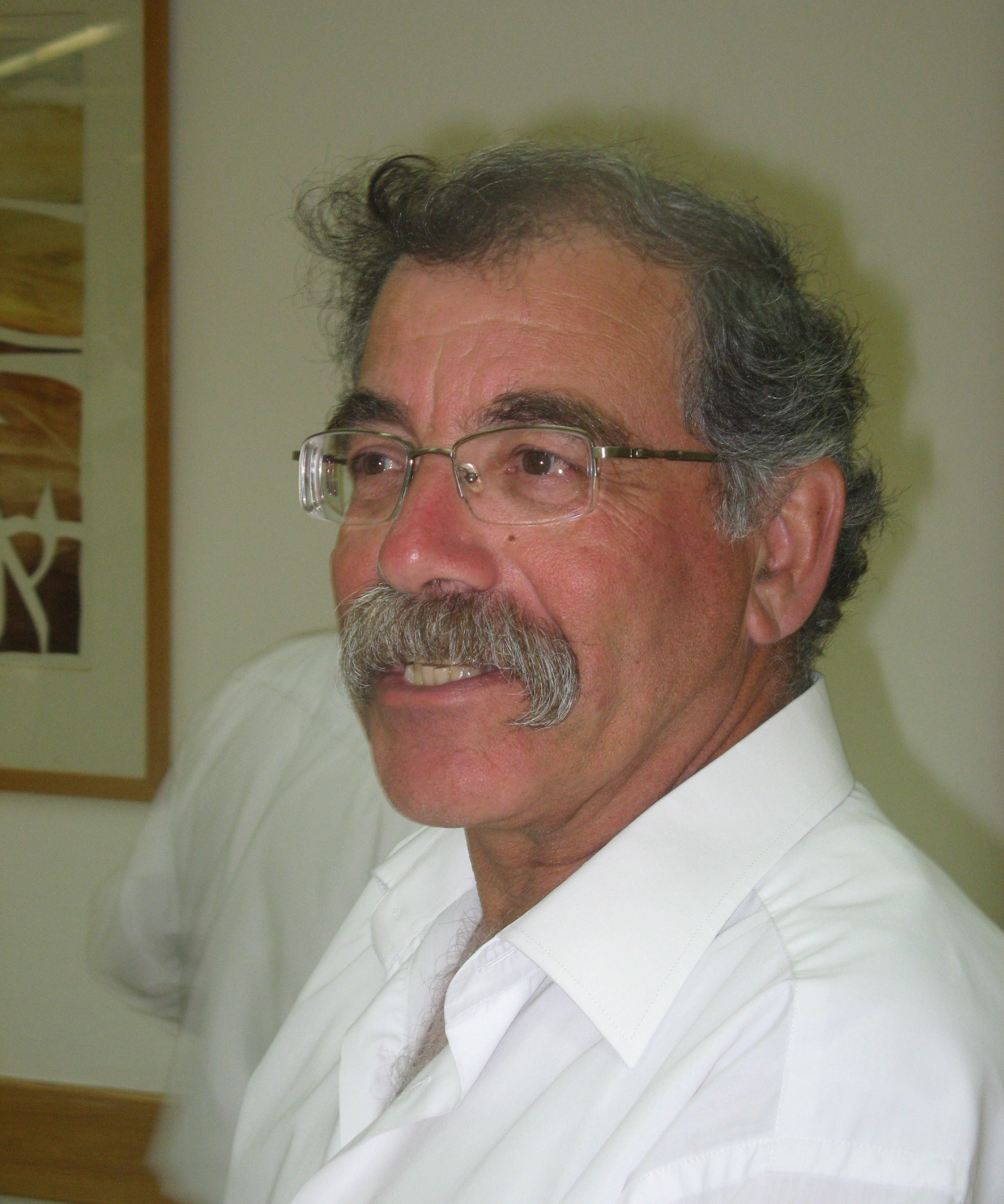
- Erlich in 2009
- Born: 1953
- Died: November 20, 2024 (aged 70–71)

Ze'ev Hanoch (Zhabo) Erlich (Hebrew: זאב חנוך (ז'אבו) ארליך; 1953 – November 20, 2024) was an Israeli archaeologist specializing in archaeology within the Land of Israel, one of the founders of the Ofra field school, and editor of the book series "Samaria and Benjamin" and "Judea and Samaria Research Studies".

== Biography ==
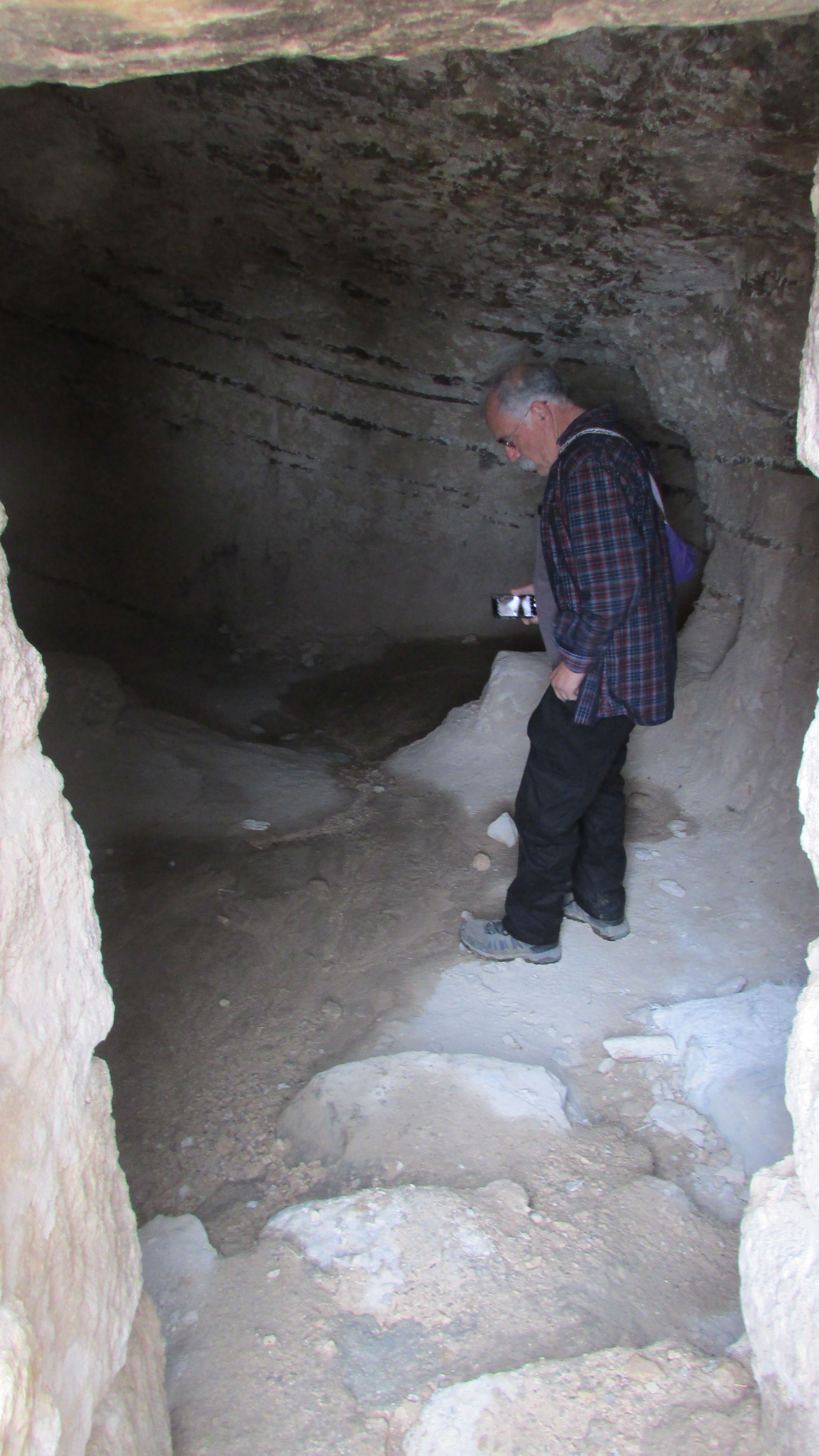
Erlich at a cave at Machaerus, 2019

Ze’ev Hanoch Ehrlich was born in 1953 to Hadassah and Yisrael Ehrlich. His father was a Sochatchov Hasid and a scholar who edited numerous books on the history of prominent Jewish figures from Poland. He was educated in Religious Zionist institutions and studied at the Yeshivat Hakotel in Jerusalem. He holds a bachelor's degree in Talmud and Jewish History from the Hebrew University of Jerusalem and Touro College. During his military service in the Israel Defense Forces (IDF), he served as an infantry officer. He was injured during the Yom Kippur War and reached the rank of major in the reserves. Between 1988 and 1991, during the First Intifada, he joined the IDF as an intelligence officer in the Judea sector, and in May 1989, he was injured by shrapnel during a clash with terrorists in Beit Ula.

He resided in Ofra and was among the founders of the Ofra Field School. He was a guide, tour leader, and researcher of the Land of Israel, publishing dozens of studies on the subject and writing a regular column on these topics in the Sabbath supplement of the "Makor Rishon" newspaper. He was one of the researchers of the Old City of Nablus, which he described as his favorite city after Jerusalem, and its underground water systems beneath the city's kasbah.

He lectured on the history and geography of the Land of Israel at the Lander Institute in Jerusalem and at Orot Israel College. Over the years, he conducted tours for soldiers and officers, forming close ties with senior military officials. He documented archaeological sites in Palestinian villages in the West Bank, and the IDF granted him access to archaeological and historical sites which were otherwise inaccessible, including those in Area A. In June 2014, he accompanied the commander of the Kfir Brigade, Asher Ben Lulu, during Operation Brother's Keeper. Following the operation, he contributed to the establishment of the "Har Tzion" unit, initiated by Paratroopers Brigade commander Eliezer Toledano, to equip regional forces with the field knowledge of Land of Israel researchers. Later, he was among the founders of the Mar'ol unit, specializing in open-source intelligence collection, surveillance, and tracking movement in the field.

== Death ==
On November 20, 2024, during Israel's invasion of Lebanon, Erlich joined a Golani Brigade unit fighting near the village of Shamaa, at the invitation of Golani’s Commander, Col. (Res.) Yoav Yarom. The force encountered militants who waited in ambush at one of the Crusader fortresses. Ehrlich and another soldier, Sgt. Gur Kehati, were killed on the spot. Yarom sustained moderate injuries, while another company commander was seriously wounded.

Erlich was posthumously re-enlisted as a reservist and recognized as a fallen IDF soldier. He was buried the following day in a military ceremony at the cemetery of his hometown of Ofra.

Simultaneously, a Military Police investigation was launched into the circumstances of Erlich's entry into Lebanon as a civilian, examining whether it violated IDF orders. Yarom claimed he required Erlich's assistance in locating suspected militants at an archaeological site, primarily due to Erlich's extensive knowledge of underground systems. According to another account, Erlich entered Lebanon to conduct independent research, and the force was dispatched specifically to protect him. Following the incident, Yarom requested to step down from his position. Military prosecutors announced in September 2025 their intention to prosecute Yarom, but three months later a new Military Advocate General, Itai Ofir, decided to drop all charges upon assuming office. The move drew public outrage.
