= Sham Lal =

Sham Lal may refer to:

- Sham Lal (journalist), Indian literary critic and journalist
- Sham Lal (gymnast), Indian gymnast
- Sham Lal (politician), Pakistani politician
- Sham Lal Choudhary, Indian politician

== See also ==
- Shyamlal
