= Shamaa =

Shamaa شمعا
- Municipality
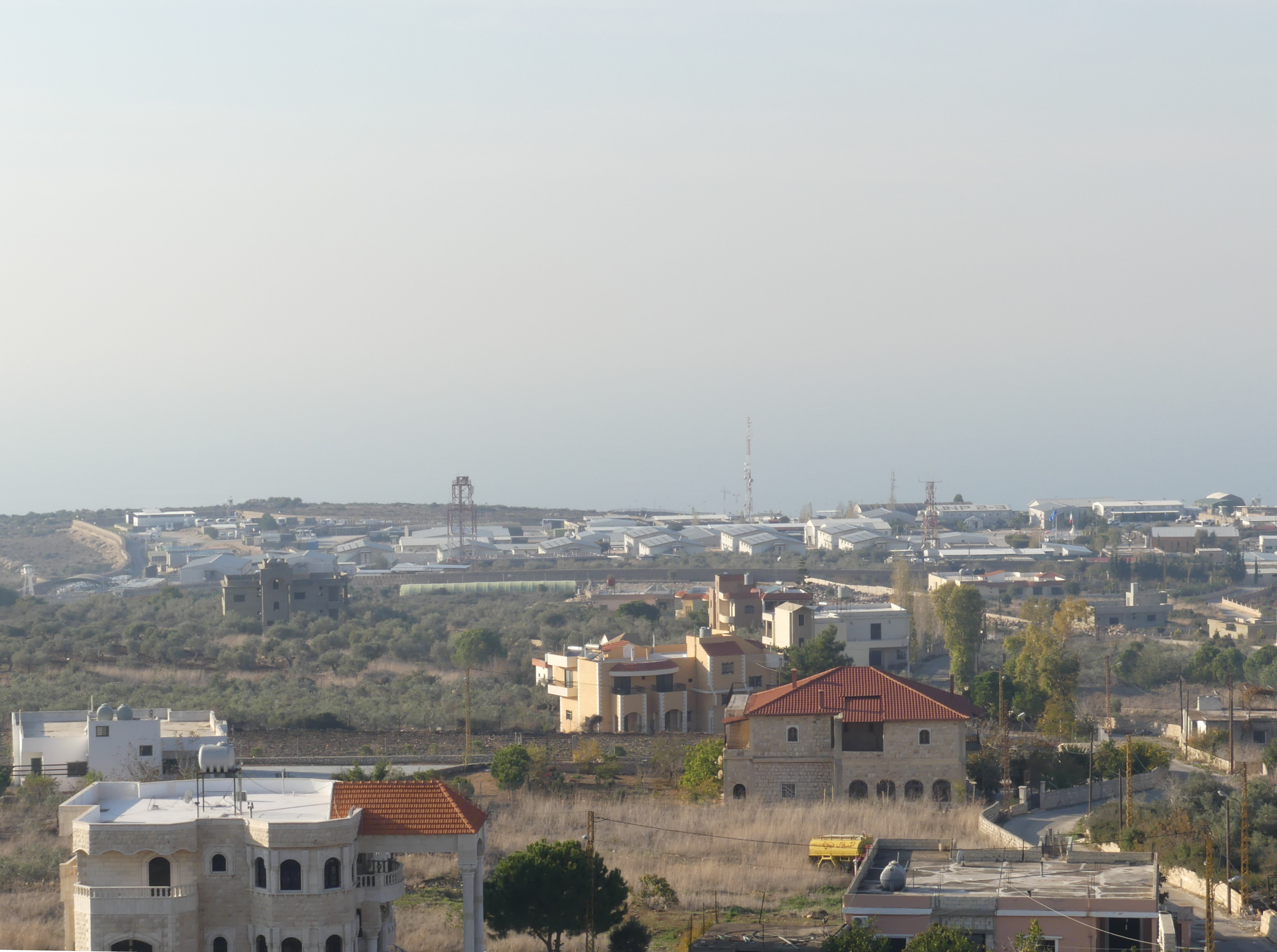

- Location within Lebanon
- Coordinates: 33°08′44″N 35°12′29″E
- Grid position: 169/283 PAL
- Country: Lebanon
- Governorate: South Governorate
- District: Tyre District

Area
  - Total: 414 ha (1,020 acres)
- Elevation: 380 m (1,250 ft)

Population (2015)
  - Total: 301
- Time zone: EET

Shamaa (Arabic: شمعا) is a village and municipality in the Tyre District of Lebanon's South Governorate, about 25 kilometres southeast of Tyre and some 99 kilometres south of Beirut.

It is especially known for its historical castle on a strategic hill overlooking the coastal plain of Tyre and Naqoura.

The United Nations Interim Force in Lebanon (UNIFIL) Sector West headquarters, led by the contingent of the Italian army, are based on a neighbouring hill.

== Etymology ==
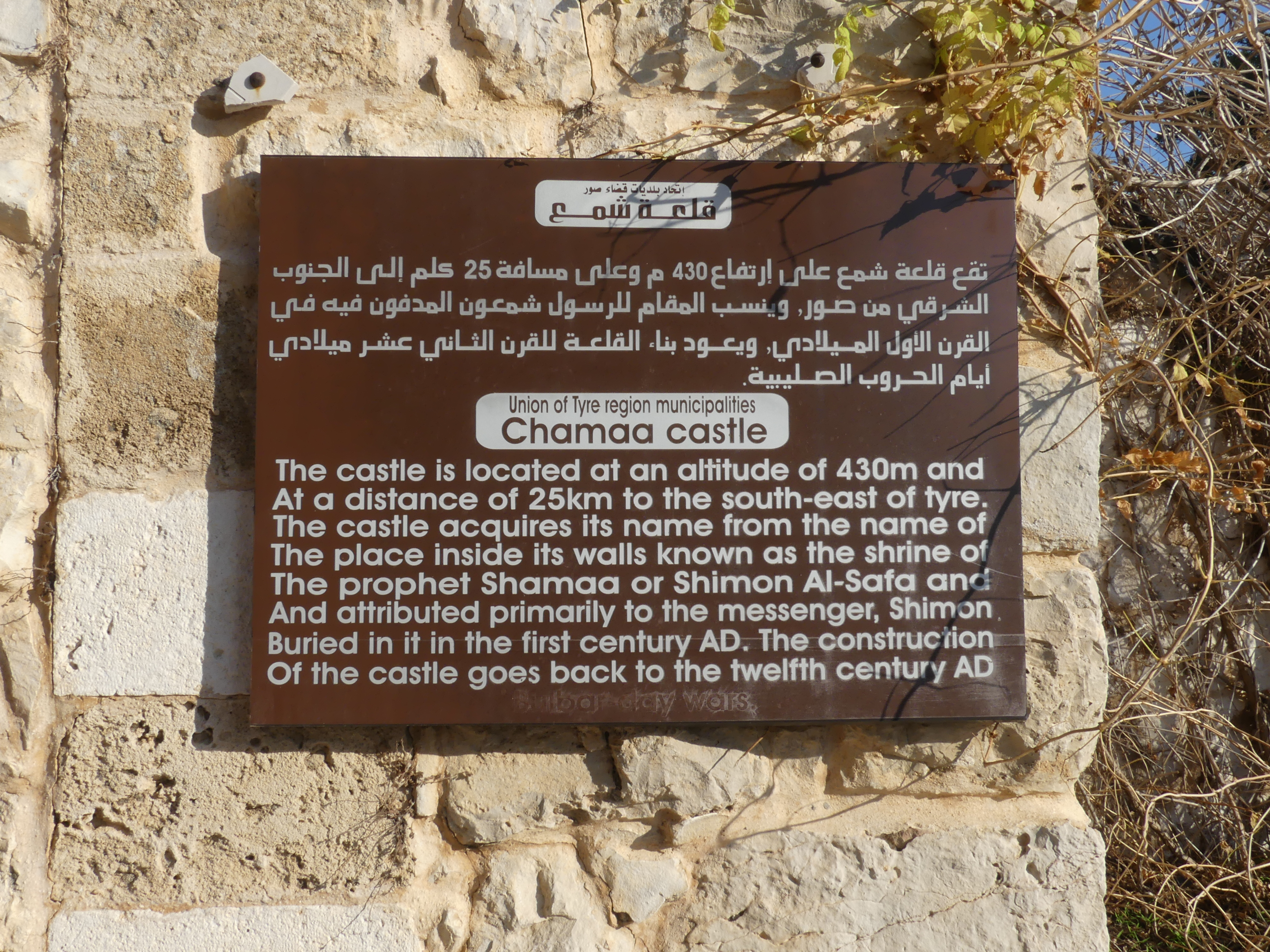
Info sign at the entrance

According to E. H. Palmer, Kŭlảt Shemả, means: "The castle of Shemả. Shemả means wax, but is probably connected with the name Shimeon."

While the transliteration of the Arabic word for castle of would more precisely be Qala'at, it has also been spelled Kalat.

Shamaa is also transliterated as Chama (according to French spelling) or Shama, and - more closely to the Arabic original pronunciation - Shama'a. It draws its name from a grave in a shrine on the main hill which is attributed by local tradition to Saint Peter, known in Arabic as Shamoun al-Safa (also transliterated Chamoun or Shimon al-Safa, from Simeon and Cephas (from the Aramaic Kepha, or rock/stone). According to this Shia belief, Saint Peter was also an ancestor to the 12th and last Shia Imam, Mahdi. Hence, thousands of Shiite pilgrims visit the memorial every year.

== History ==
Due to its strategic location near the Ladder of Tyre and vis-à-vis the often-besieged metropolis of Tyre, it is quite conceivable that the hill had hosted settlements going far back in history, perhaps - chronologically - in prehistoric times, the Early Phoenician period, the time of Egyptian rule, the Neo-Assyrian, Neo-Babylonian, Achaemenid-Persian, and Hellenistic periods.

=== Byzantine period ===
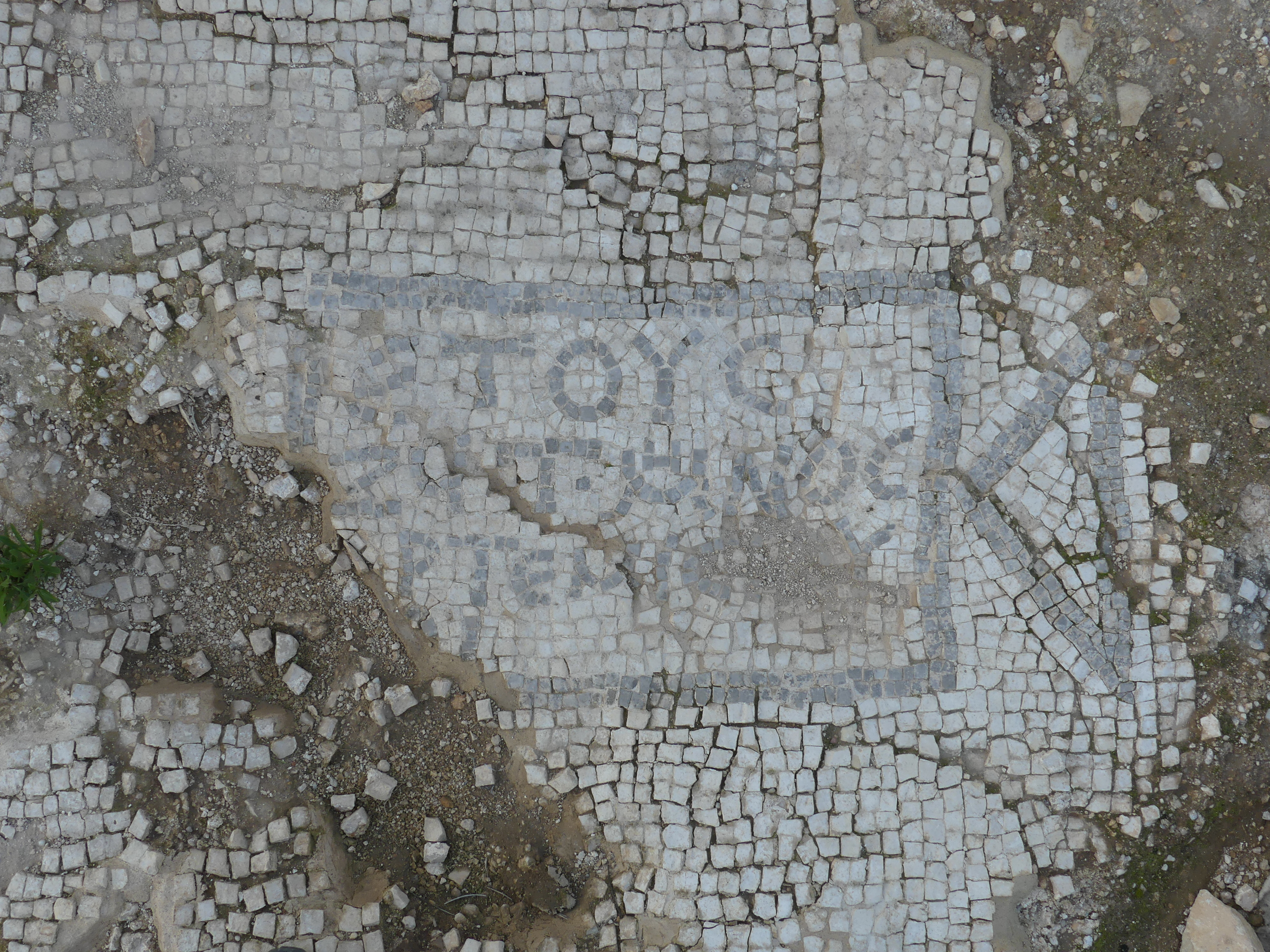
Byzantine mosaic inside the castle

The preserved remains of a Roman-Byzantine village at the closeby archaeological site of Ermet Tell seem to support the local tradition which states that the hill was used as a mausoleum in the first century CE. Evidently, the hill was inhabited during the Byzantine rule over the Levant (395–640), as is obvious from a mosaic which has been discovered on the top of the hill.

=== Early Muslim period ===
It is unclear what happened to the settlement in Shamaa after the area was conquered by the bearers of Islam in 640. During the half a millennium of early Muslim rule, the area was first governed by the Rashidun caliphs, then by Muawiyah and the Umayyad dynasty he founded, then by the Abbasid Caliphate, the Ismaili Shia Fatimid Caliphate, and the Seljuk Empire.

The exact date of the construction of the Maqam Shamoun Al Safa is unknown, but its minaret was reportedly built in the late 11th century, around the 1090s, shortly before the arrival of the Crusaders.

=== Crusader to Mamluk period ===
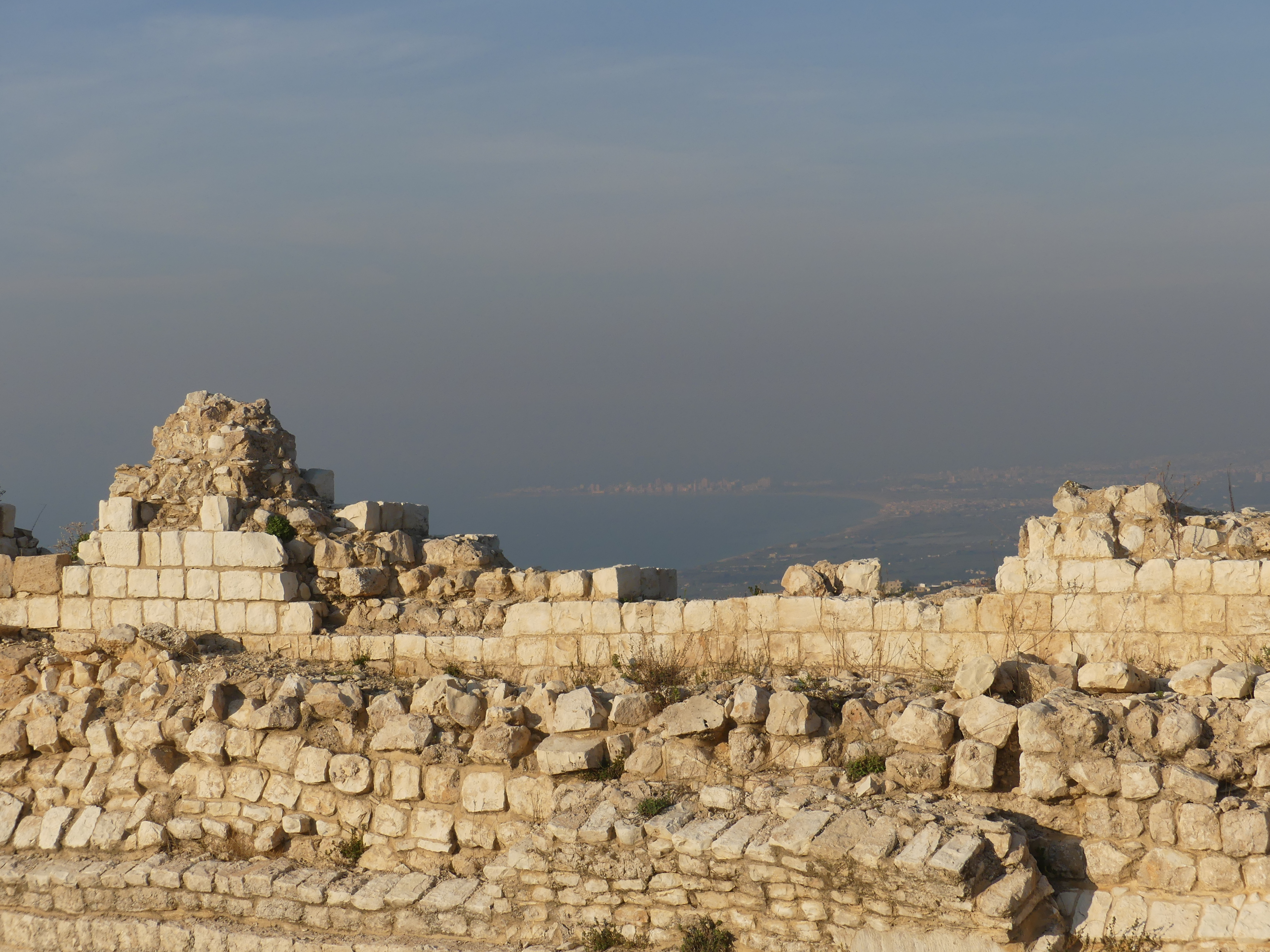
The ruined castle overlooking Tyre

In 1116, during the aftermath of the First Crusade, a Frankish army built a fortress over the Byzantine site in order to block access to the heavily fortified Tyre, which was the last city in the region held by Islamic rulers. It was eventually taken over by the Christian warriors in 1124, after a siege of almost six months had led to the negotiated surrender of Tyre by the Seljuk military leader Toghtekin. The fortress of Shamaa, which was part of the Kingdom of Jerusalem, became known as Scandelion Castle, named after the neighbouring coastal area of Iskandarounah, which itself was named after Alexander the Great.

It is unclear whether Scandelion Castle was - like many of Tyre's buildings - damaged in the 1202 earthquake and whether it remained under the control of the Lordship of Tyre, when John of Montfort entered a treaty in 1270 with Mamluk sultan Baibars and transferred sovereignty over some villages in the coastal plain to him. It is likewise unclear what happened to Shamaa Castle after the Crusaders surrendered Tyre in 1291 to the Mamluk Sultanate's army of Al-Ashraf Khalil, who had all fortifications of the city demolished to prevent the Franks from re-entrenching in the future. Like Tyre, Shamaa was subsequently governed from Acre and thus became part of Palestine, but also "sank into obscurity."

=== Ottoman period ===
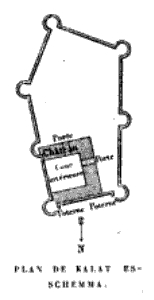
Ground plan of the castle, published by French scholar Louis Lortet in 1884

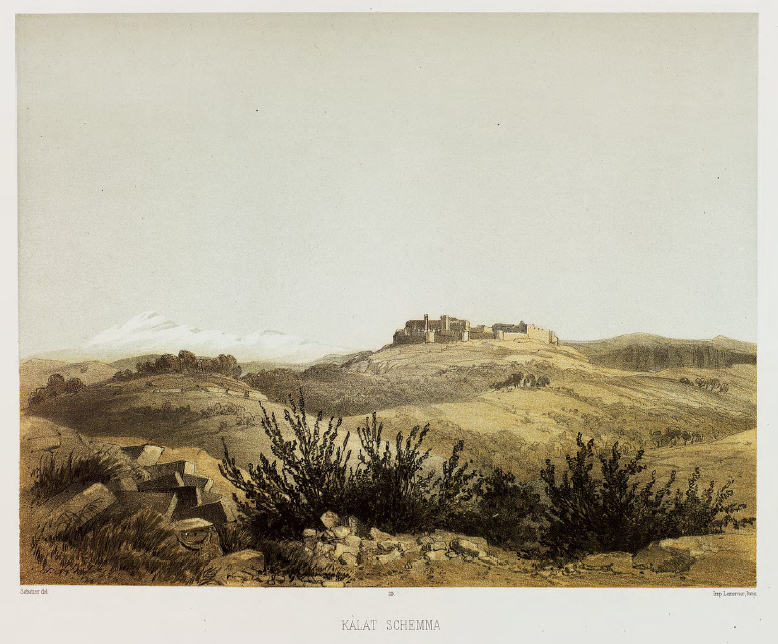
"Kalat Schemma" - illustration by Dutch painter Charles William Meredith van de Velde, who travelled the region in 1851

Although the Ottoman Empire conquered the Levant in 1516, Jabal Amel (modern-day South Lebanon) remained mostly untouched until the end of the 16th century. In the 1596 tax-records it was named as a village, Sam'a, in the Ottoman nahiya (subdistrict) of Tibnin under the Liwa of Safad, with a population of 21 households, all Muslim. The villagers paid a fixed tax rate of 25% on agricultural products, such as wheat, barley, fruit trees, goats and beehives, in addition to occasional revenues; a total of 1,920 akçe.

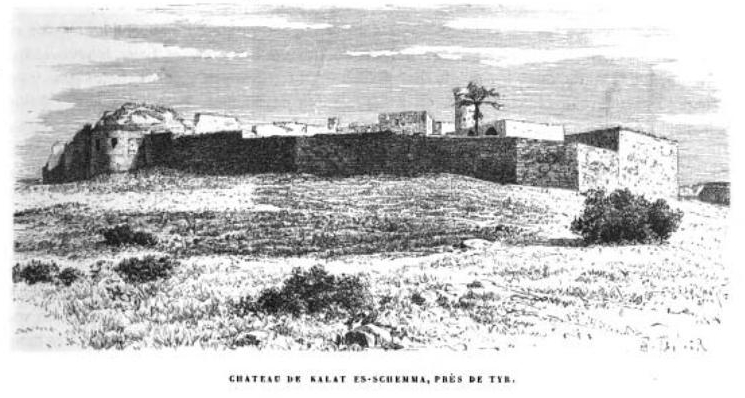
Illustration of the castle seen from the northwest by Lortet, 1884

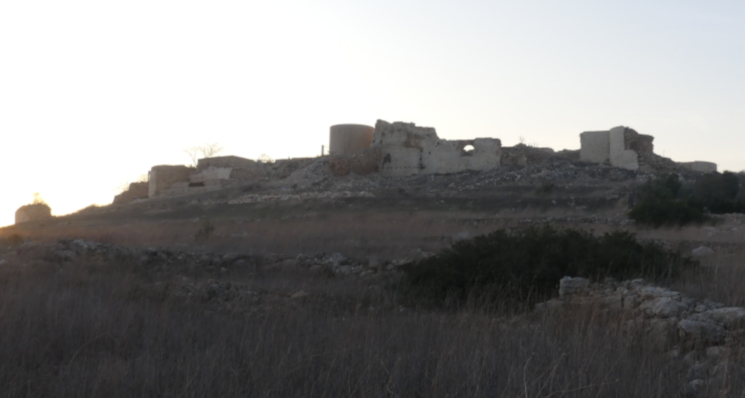
The eastern side, 2019

While the French historian Ernest Renan assumed that major construction of the castle took place in the 16th century, modern historiography assumes that it was not until the mid-18th century that Shamaa experienced a major revival. At that time, Sheikh Nasif al-Nassar of the Shiite Ali al-Saghir dynasty, which dominated Jabal Amel for altogether almost three centuries, established de facto autonomy over the area and the castle became the property of his family. During this early period, the citadel underwent extensive renovation and was used for military and residential purposes. It also included an olive press, whose foundations are still visible today.

This boom period ended, however, already after three decades in 1781, when al-Nassar was killed in a power struggle with the Ottoman governor of Sidon, Ahmad Pasha al-Jazzar, who had the Shiite population decimated in brutal purges. Thus, the Shiite autonomy in Jabal Amel ended for a quarter century. According to Arab sources, Jazzar Pasha had his senior commander Salim Pasha al-Kabir demolish Shamaa Castle, like many other fortifications of al-Nassar.

Barely a century later, in 1875, French explorer Victor Guérin noted:

"This castle, which is said to date only from Dhaher el-A'mer, is currently in ruins. Built on a high plateau, from where we enjoy a very wide view, it is surrounded by an enclosure that flank from distance to distance semicircular towers, built, like the enclosure itself, with regular parts, but of dimensions mediocre, except for the lower course, which, arranged in an embankment, generally consist of larger blocks of ancient appearance. The interior was divided into two parts: one to the north, where the pasha resided, and the other to the south, which contained about sixty private dwellings. These are, for the most part, half overturned. The same is true of the serais or castle proper, some rooms of which are currently used as cattle stables. The divan room was adorned with several monolithic columns of gray granite, raised to some ancient monument. Near there, an oualy still standing with its white dome and its minaret is dedicated to Neby Chema'oun es-Safa. A beautiful cistern adjoins it. Some Métualis families have taken up residence in the midst of these ruins.

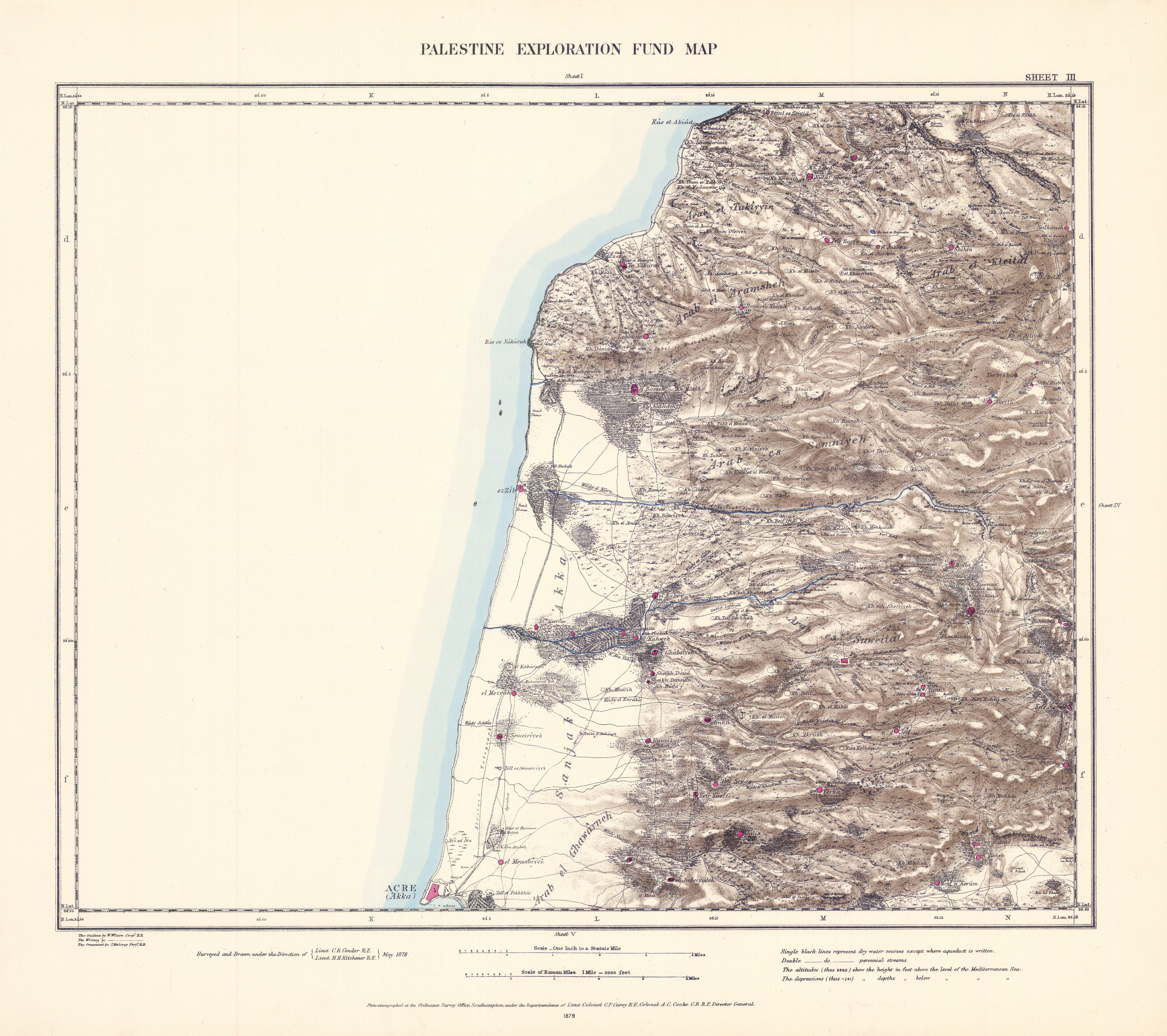
"Kulat Shema" on the 1877 map of the PEF Survey of Palestine

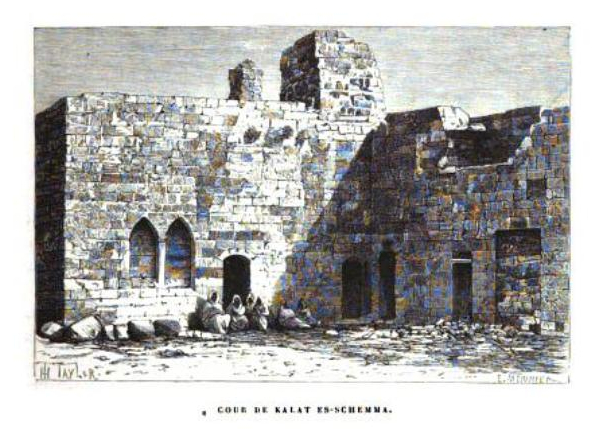
A courtyard in Shamaa, illustration by Lortet

In 1881, the PEF's Survey of Western Palestine (SWP) described Kulat Shema as "A modern-built castle, situated on a very high conical and conspicuous hill seen from a distance, and is occupied by about forty Moslems. The ground around is covered with brushwood, and is uncultivated. There are ten cisterns for water. They further noted: "A Saracenic castle, also said to have been built by Dhahr el 'Amr. The walls and flanking towers are now falling to ruin. The place is occupied by about thirty Mohammedans ; it is situated on a very high conical and conspicuous hill, and was no doubt at one time a strong place."

When the French physician, botanist, zoologist and Egyptologist Louis Lortet visited Shamaa around the same time, he could not find any information about the history of the fortress, and likewise it remained obscure until the violent end of the 20th century.

=== Post World War II ===
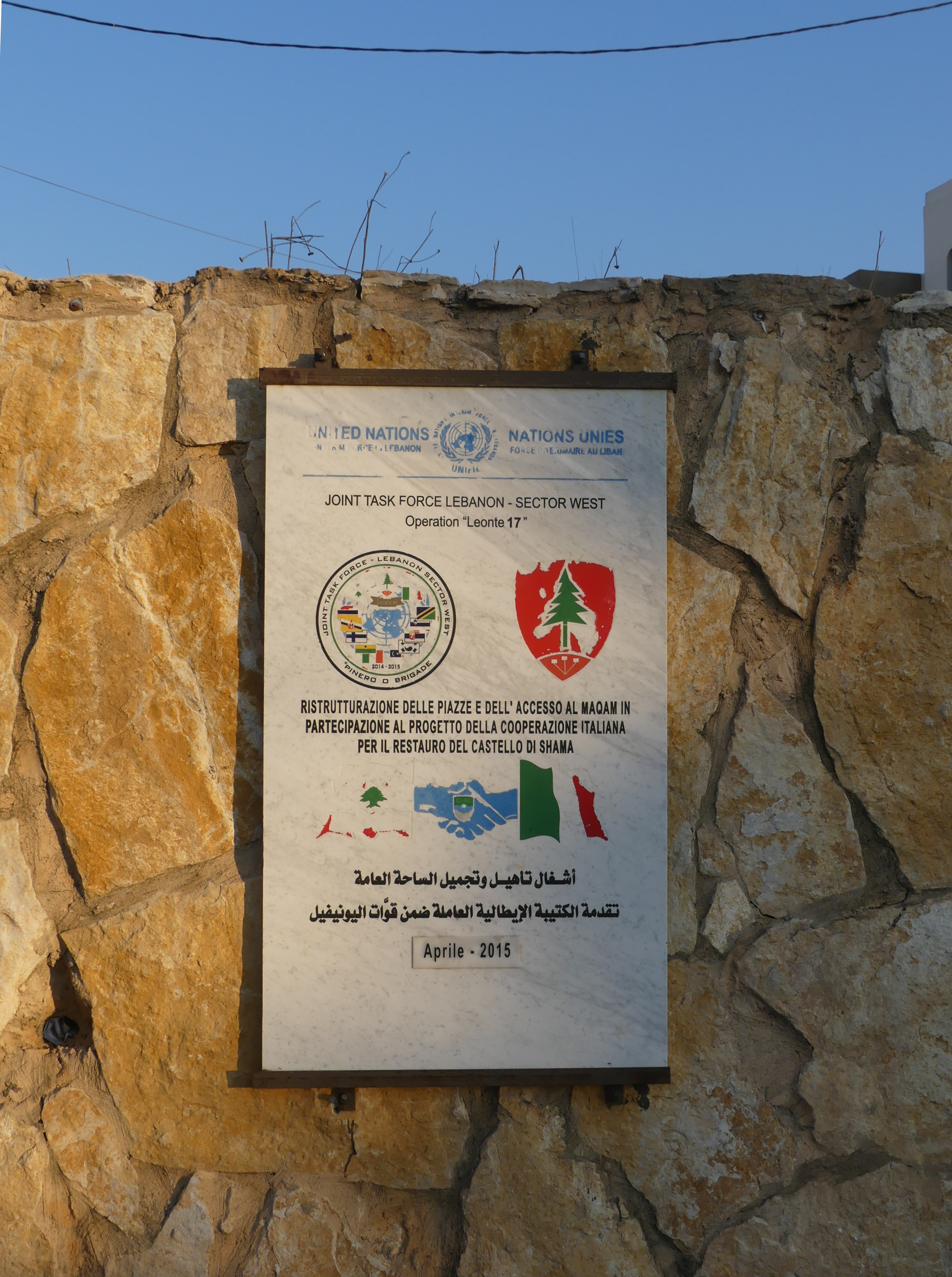
Plaque for an Italian project that rehabilitated the main square in order to provide better access to the shrine and the castle

During the 1982 Lebanon War and the subsequent occupation by Israel the castle of Chamaa apparently became a military base for the Israel Defense Forces (IDF), which were accused of wrecking the internal structures of the fort. In 1992 Israeli forces bulldozed and destroyed the Chamaa citadel's gateway. In late 1997, attacks by Amal and Hezbollah guerillas on Israeli forces and units of the pro-Israeli South Lebanon Army (SLA) militia in Chamaa were reported.

During Israel's invasion in the July 2006 Lebanon War, 21 civilians from the village of Marwahin, mostly children, were killed just outside of Chamaa in an Israeli Navy strike followed by a helicopter attack on their convoy while they were attempting to evacuate under Israeli orders. UNIFIL medical teams reportedly came under fire during their rescue mission.

In July 2006 the citadel was extensively damaged by Israeli bombing: an estimated 80% of the citadel was damaged, including its main tower. After the conflict the shrine of Shamoun was rehabilitated with support from the Sheikhdom of Qatar, and a restoration project for the citadel, largely financed by a grant of 700,000 euros from the Italian government, was initiated, with restoration work starting in 2017

In July 2007, a French UNIFIL soldier was killed near Chamaa when an unexploded ordnance from the 2006 war blew up as he was trying to clear it.

It is not clear in which year UNIFIL established the Sector West HQ in Chamaa, about 10 kilometres north of the Blue Line. According to Italian military analysts, by 2015 the Italian Armed Forces deployed at their West Sector headquarters Ten. Millevoi in Chamaa a contingent of "approximately 1100 men and women, together with the contingents of other 11 nations for a total military [of] 3500".

The mayor of Shamaa municipality has been Abdel-Qader Safieddine. Safieddine is also the most common name on the epitaphs of the cemetery next to the mausoleum of Shamoun Al Safa.

In response to Israel's invasion of Lebanon in 2024, UNESCO granted enhanced protection to 34 cultural properties in Lebanon including the citadel of Shamaa to safeguard against damage. During the invasion, 71-year-old Israeli archaeologist Zhabo Erlich and an Israeli soldier were killed in clashes with Hezbollah fighters. Among the wounded was chief of staff of the Golani Brigade, Col. Yoav Yarom. On December 31, 2024, the first joint Lebanese army and the UNIFIL patrol entered the town.

In 2024, the only recently-restored citadel was again extensively damaged by Israeli airstrikes, after which it was granted the highest level of UNESCO protection. This enhanced protection designation prohibits sites from being targeted or used for military purposes, with violations potentially constituting serious breaches of the 1954 Hague Convention. In 2025, Lebanon's Ministry of Culture appealed to UNESCO citing reports indicating the "destruction and complete demolition of the Citadel of Chama by military bulldozing operations" by Israel. In July 2026, the Mount Amel Castles, including the Shamaa Castle, were designated by UNESCO as a World Heritage Site and immediately classified as endangered.

== Demographics ==
In 2014 Muslims made up 99.16% of registered voters in Shamaa. 94.97% of the voters were Shiite Muslims.

== Gallery ==
=== The Maqam Shamoun Al Safa shrine ===
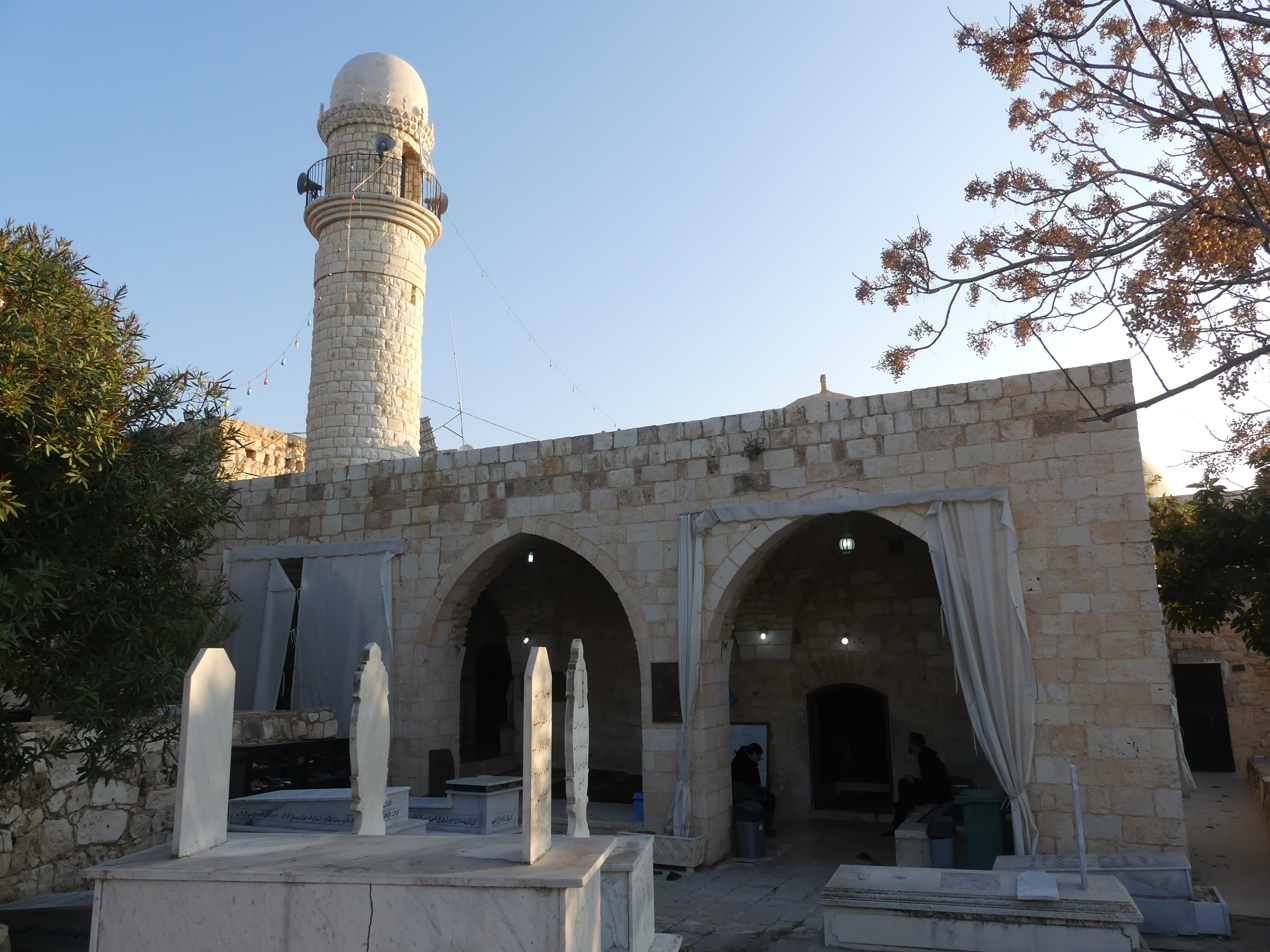
Shiite cemetery at the entrance side, most epitaphs bear the family name "Safieddine"

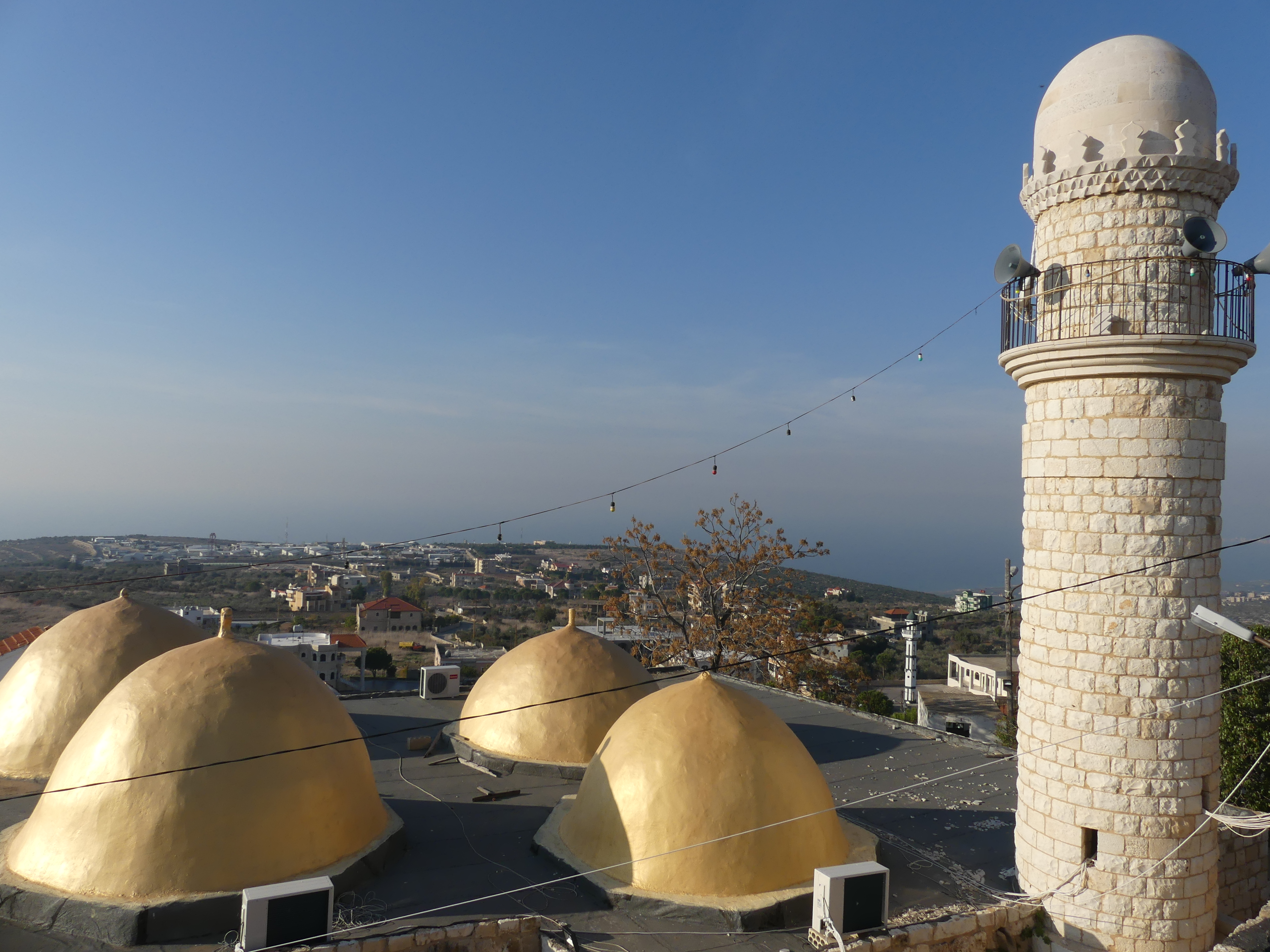
View towards the Sea with the UNIFIL base in the background

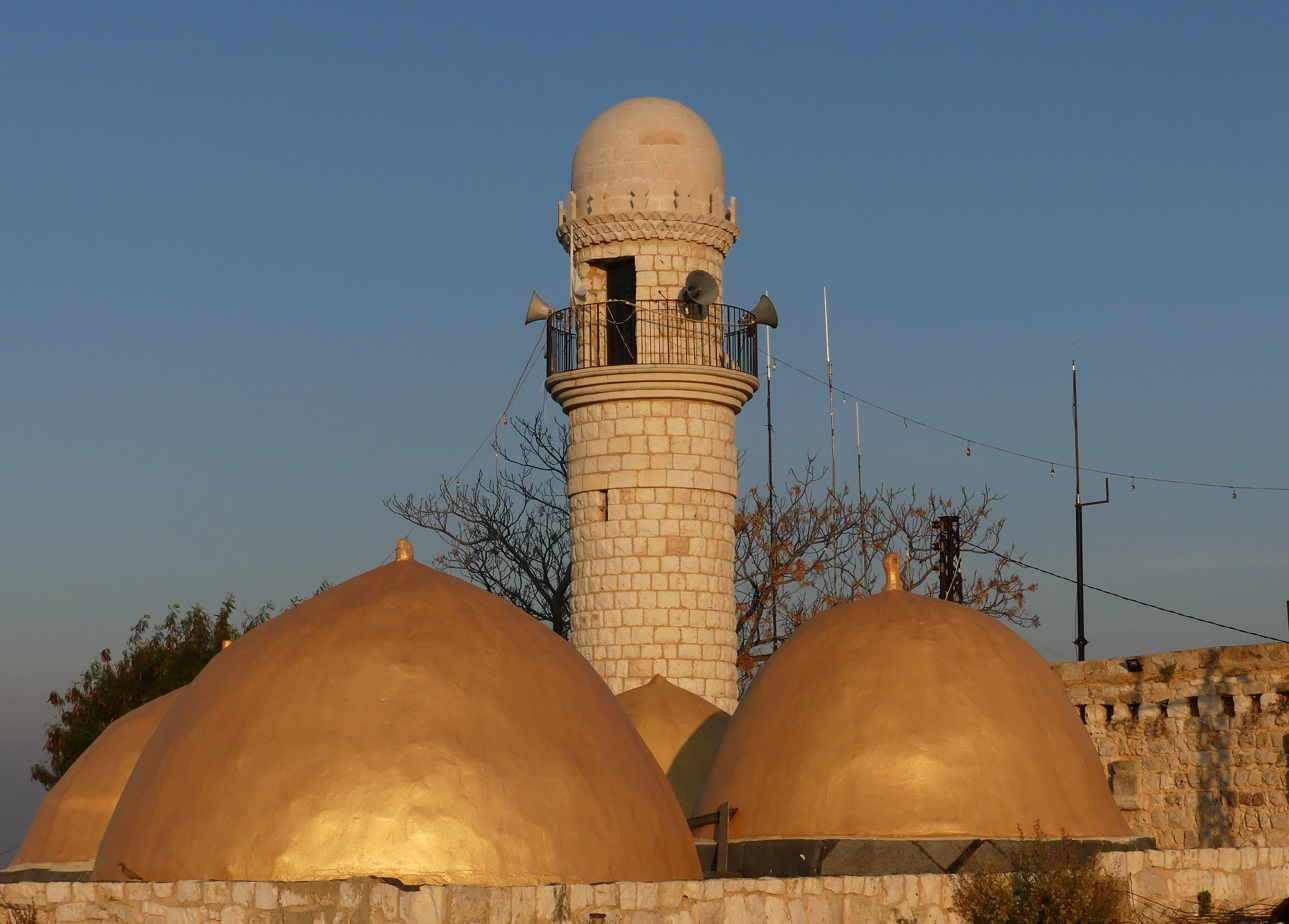
View towards the North

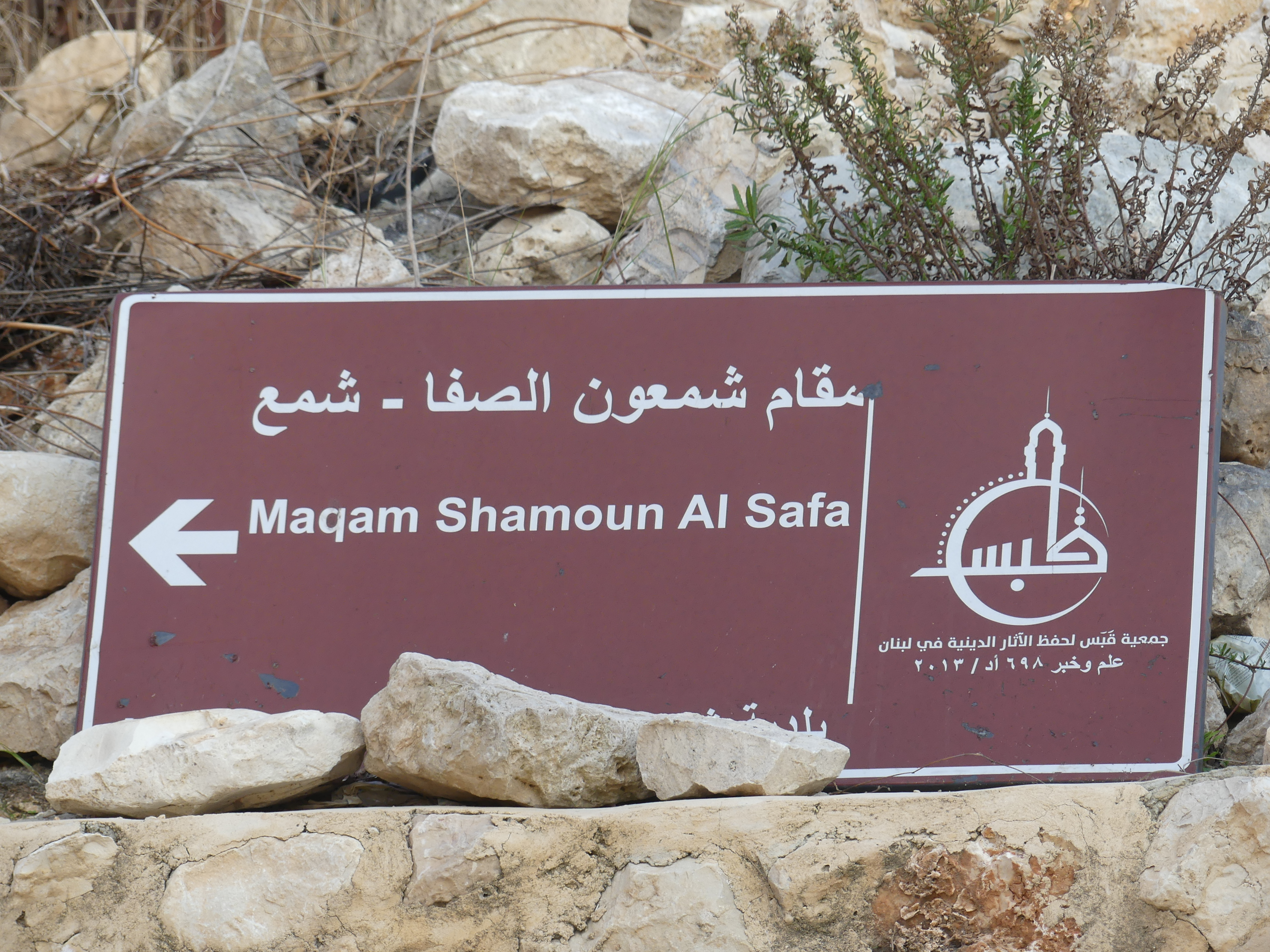
Info sign

=== The Castle ===
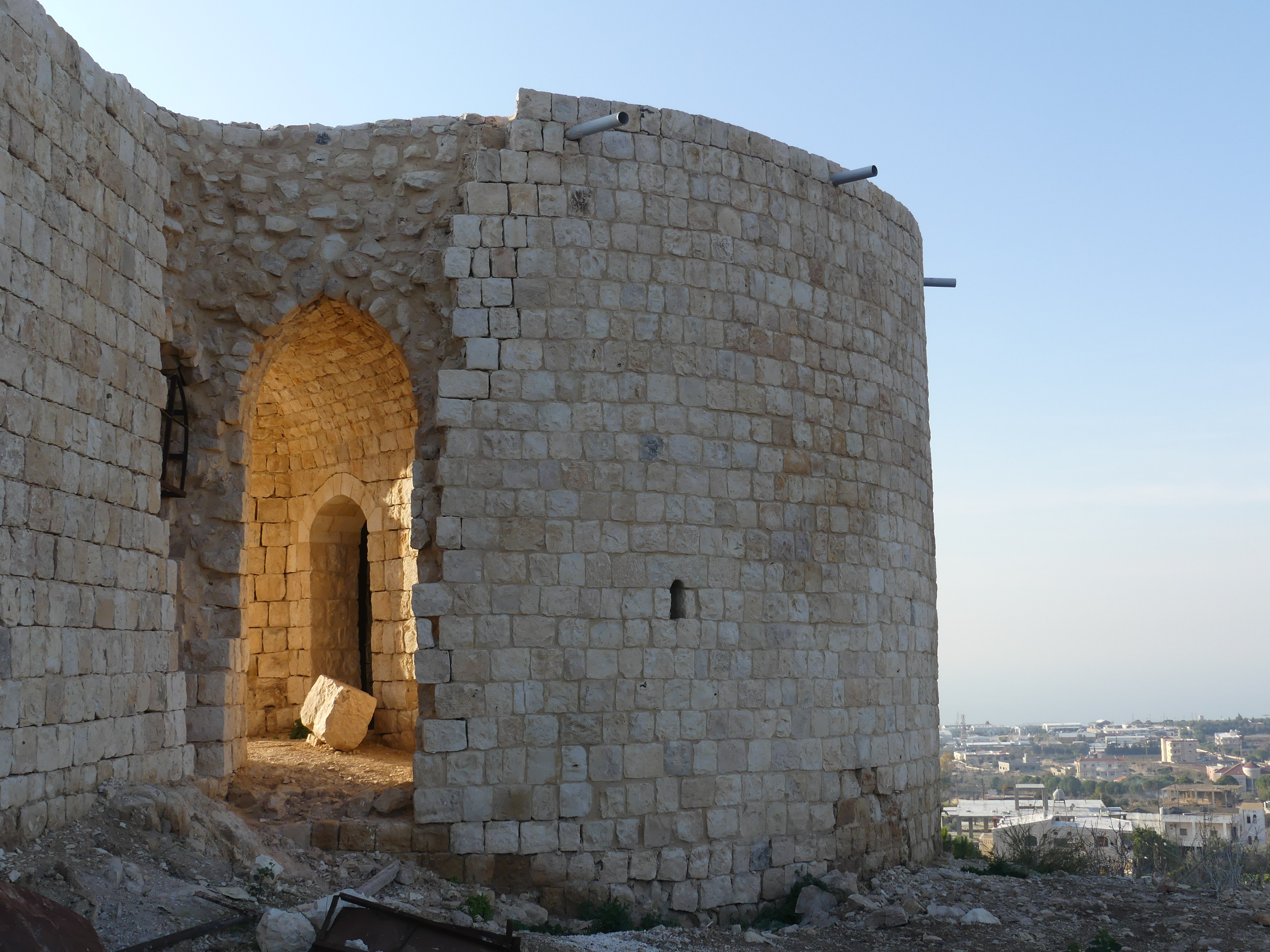
Northwestern tower

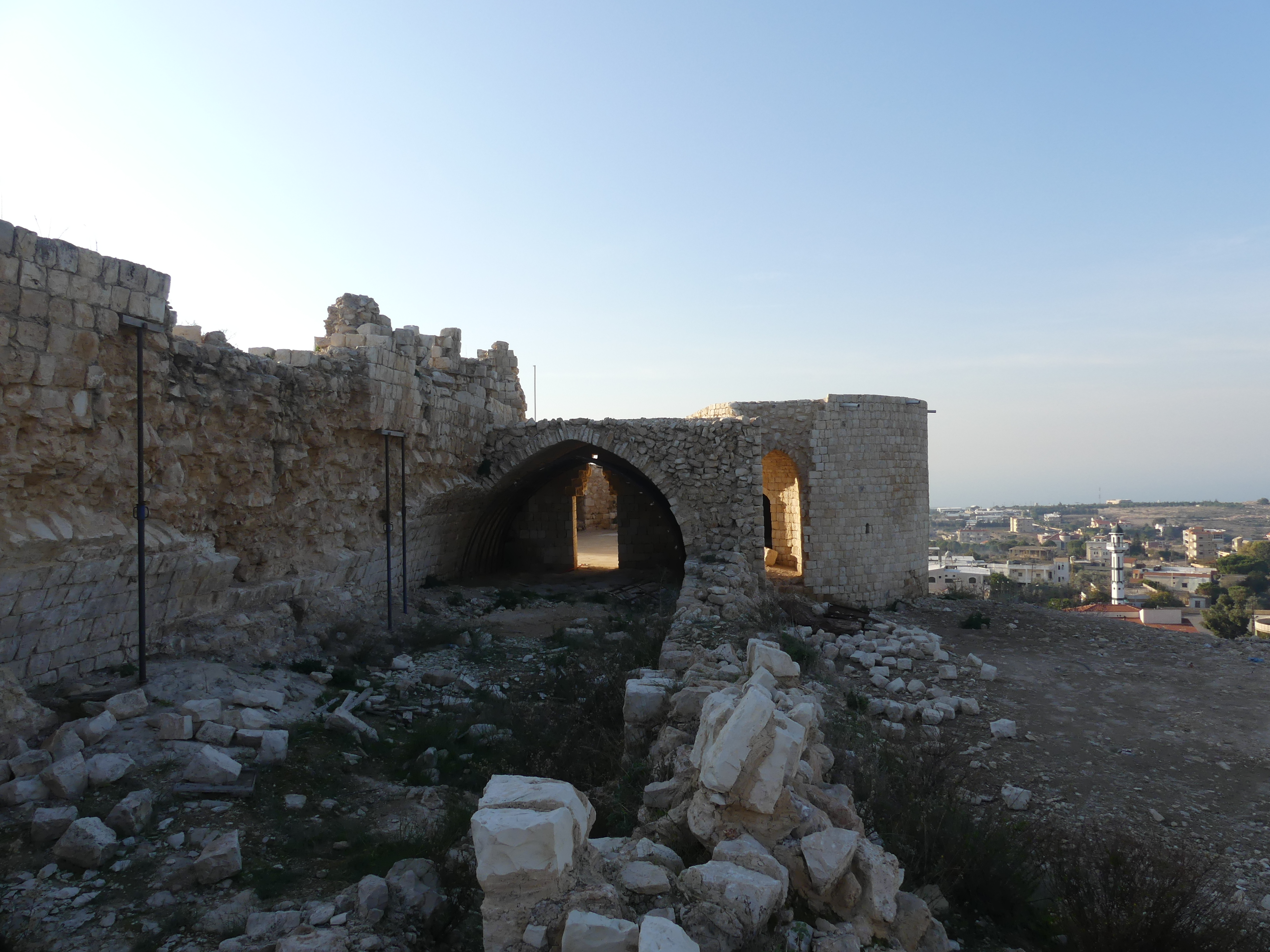
Ruins of the northern flank

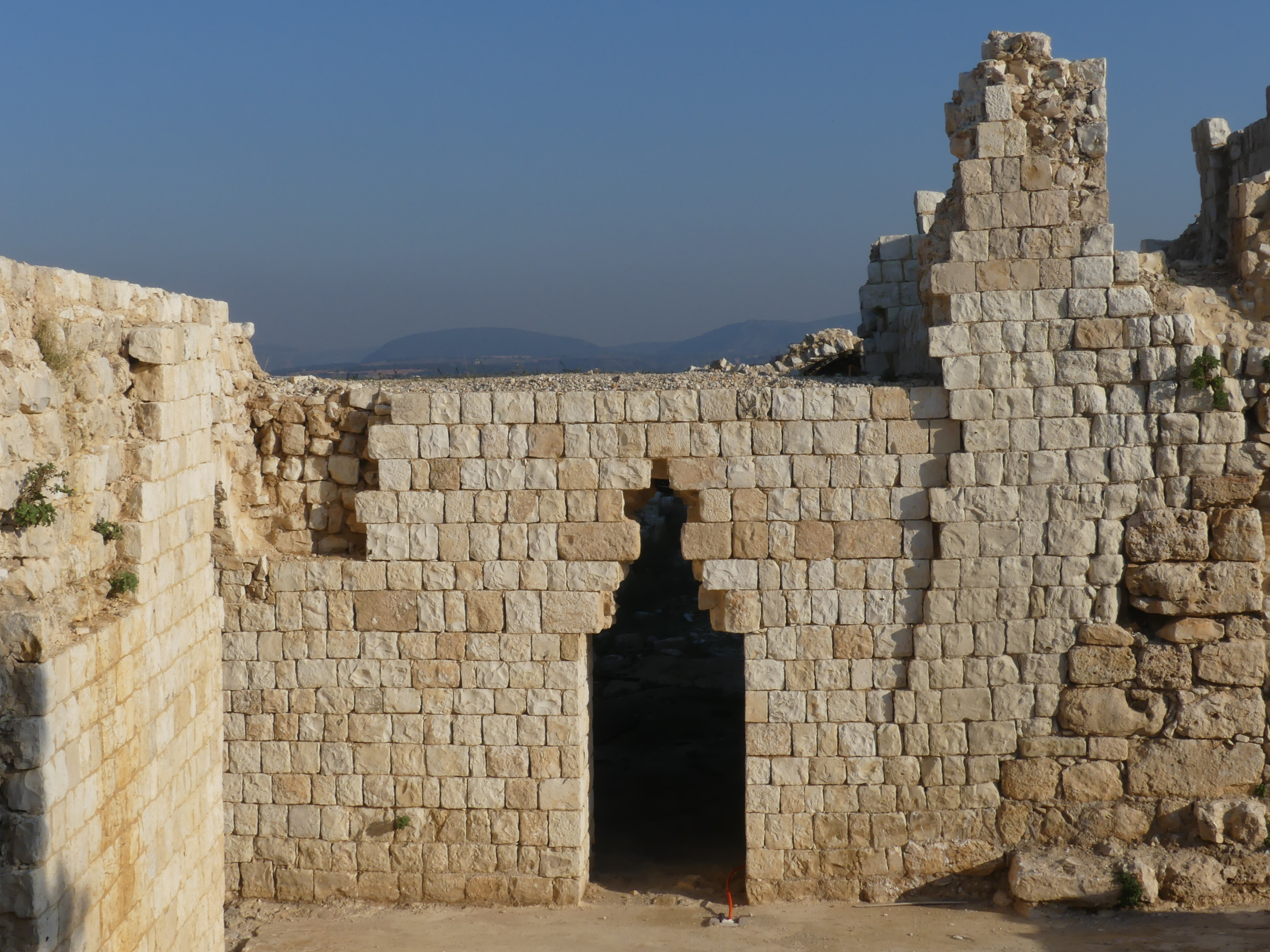
Entrance to the northwestern tower, looking North

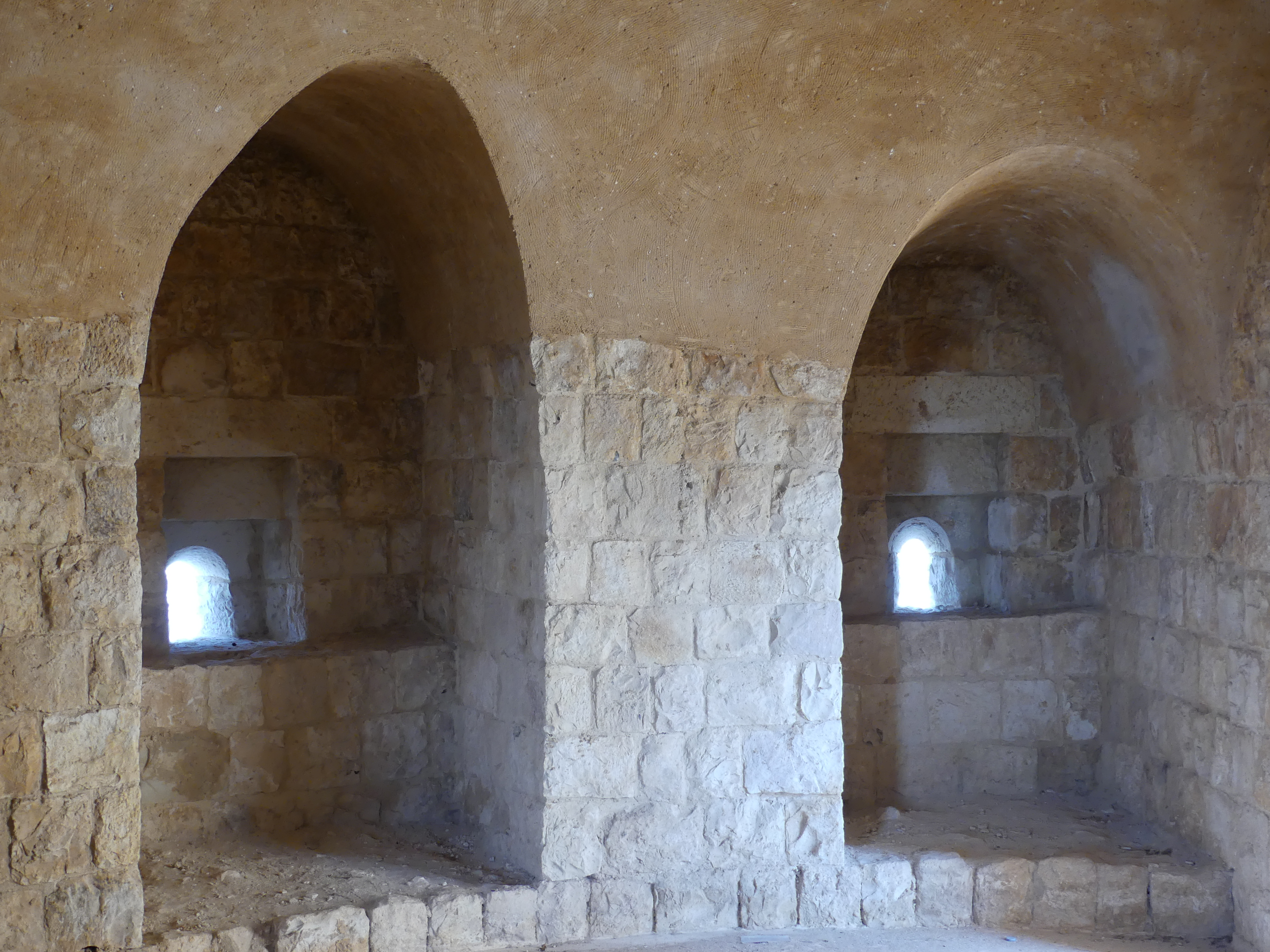
Embrasures in the northwestern tower

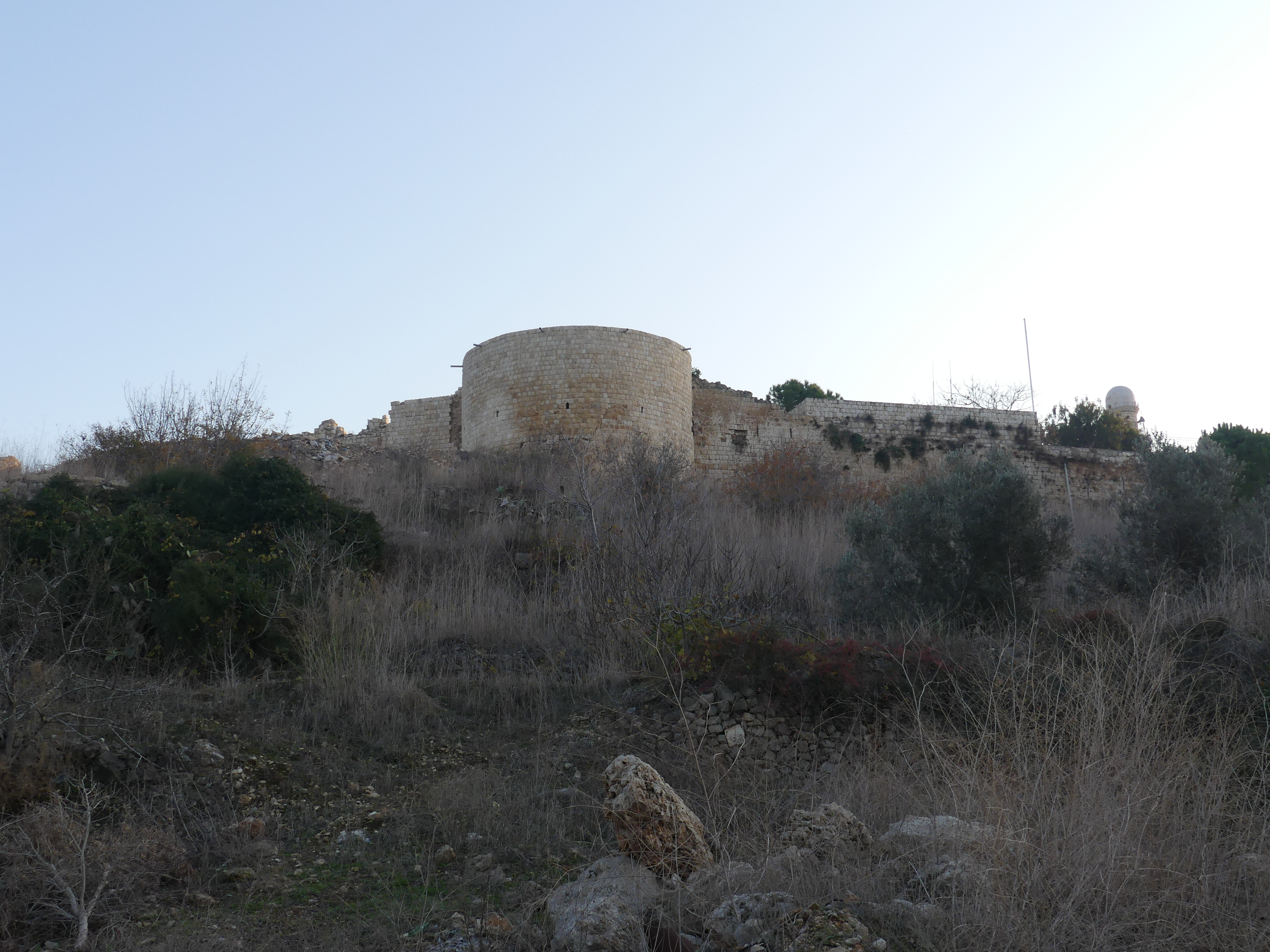
The northwestern tower with the shrine's minaret (right)

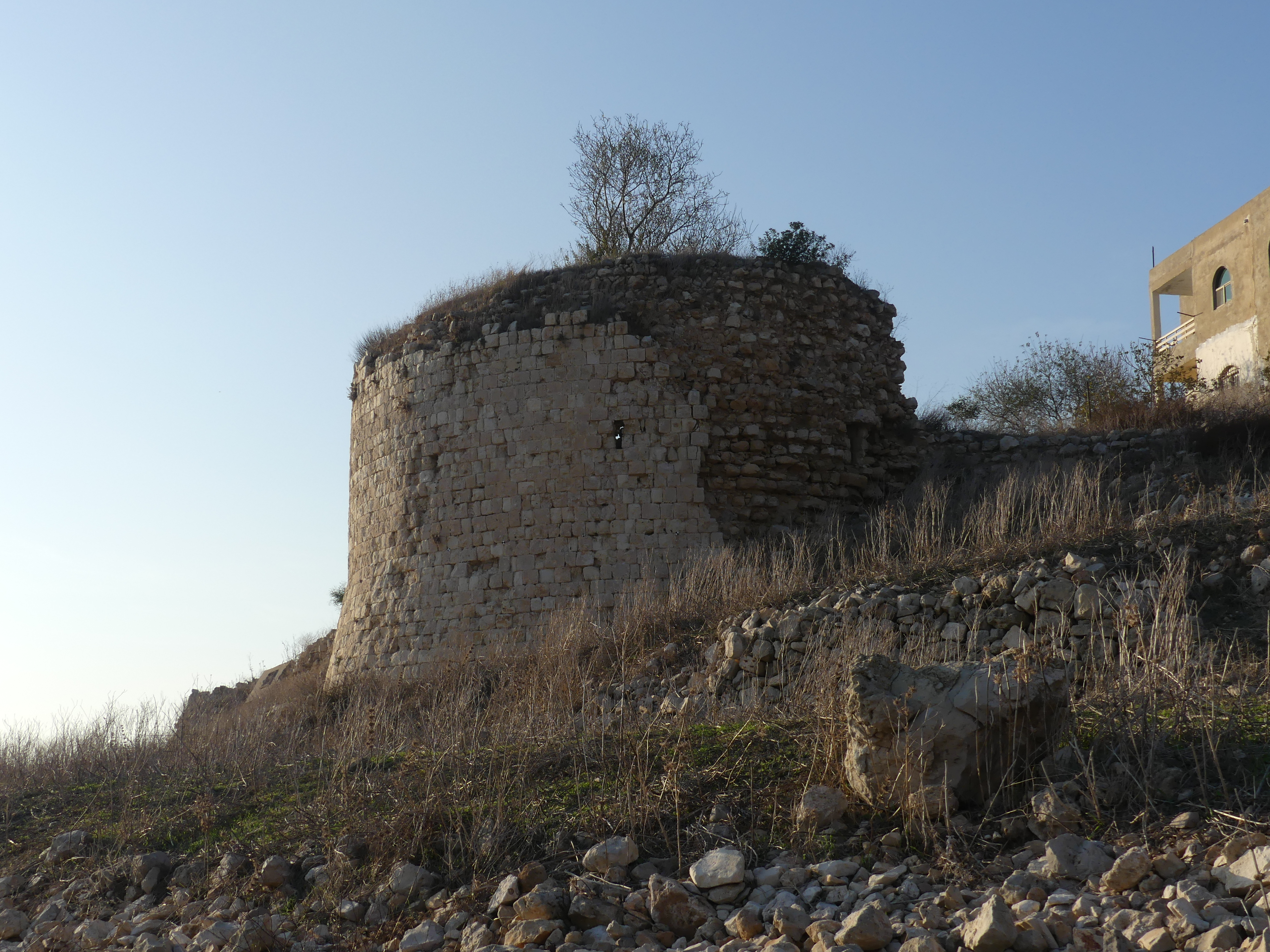
One of the two southeastern towers

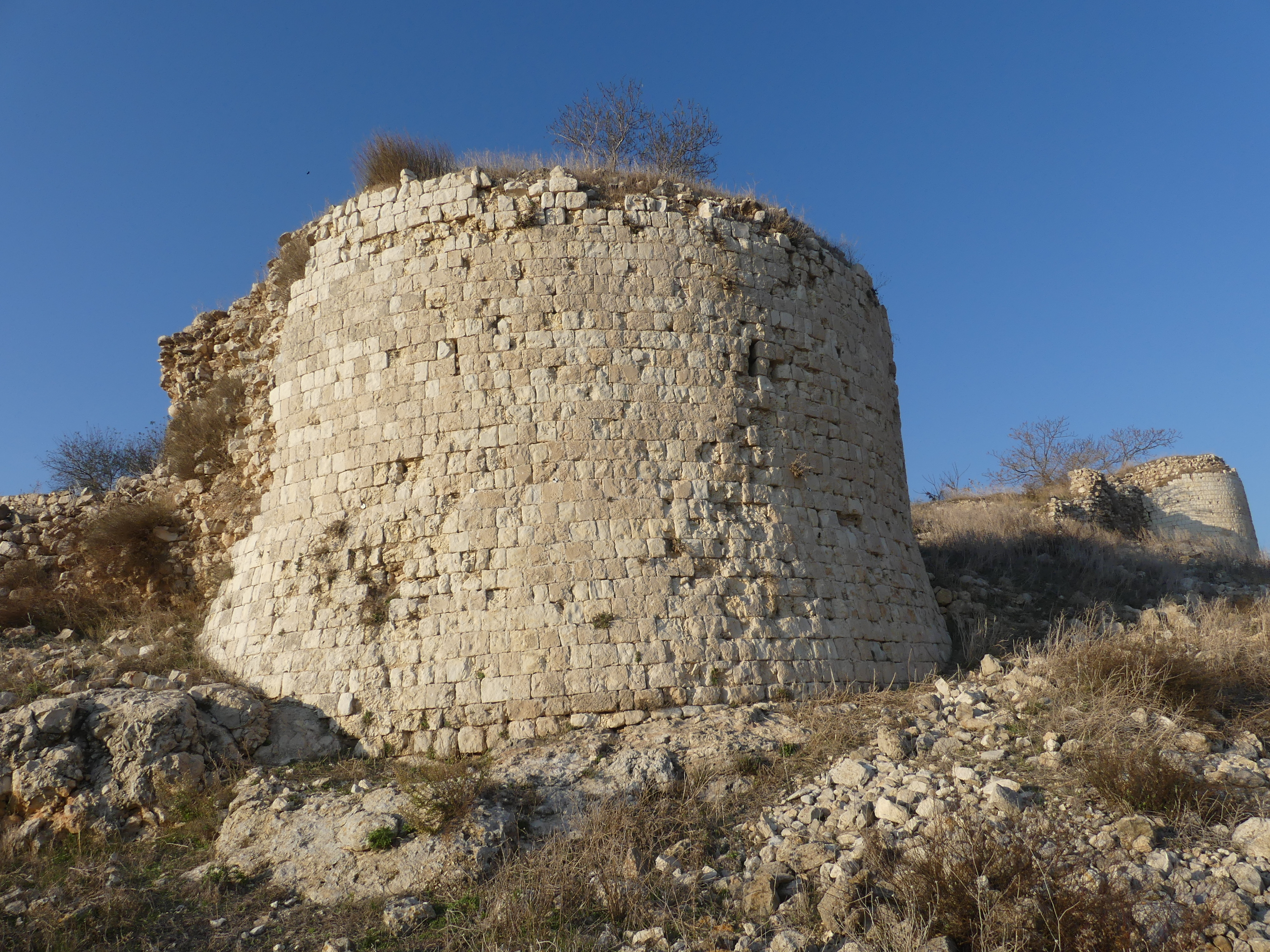
The two southeastern towers

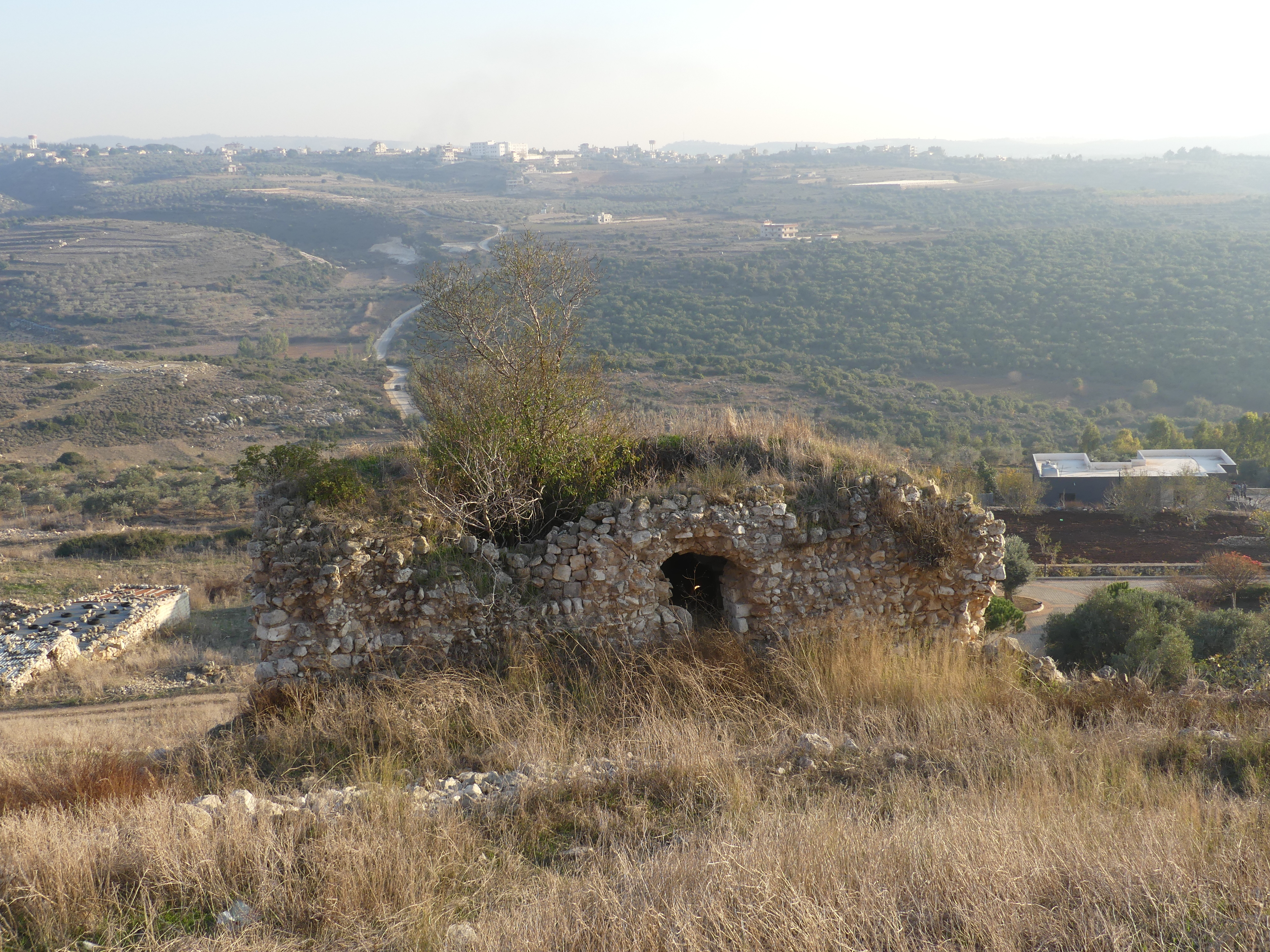
Backside of one of the two southeastern towers

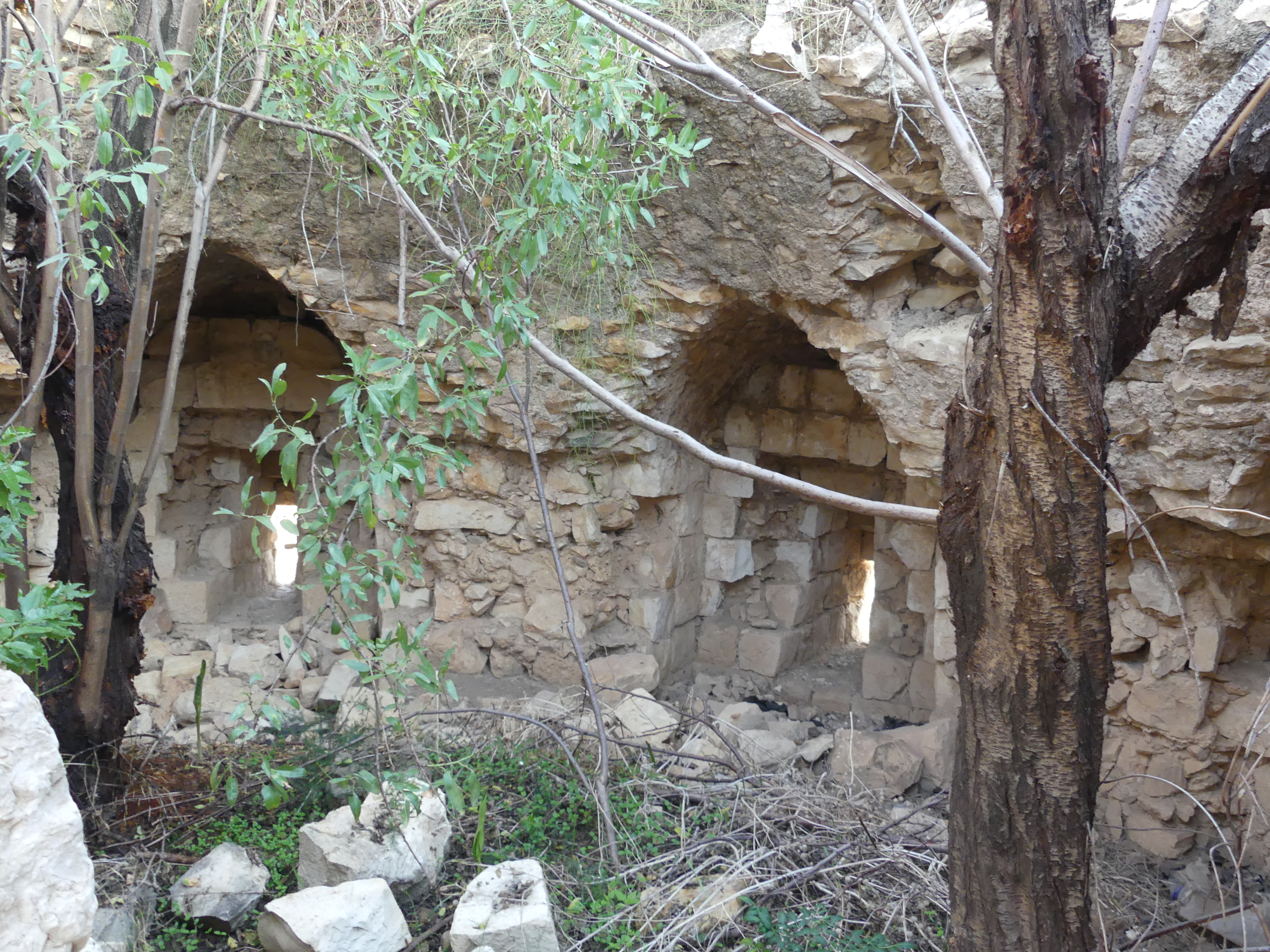
Embrasure in one of the two southeastern towers

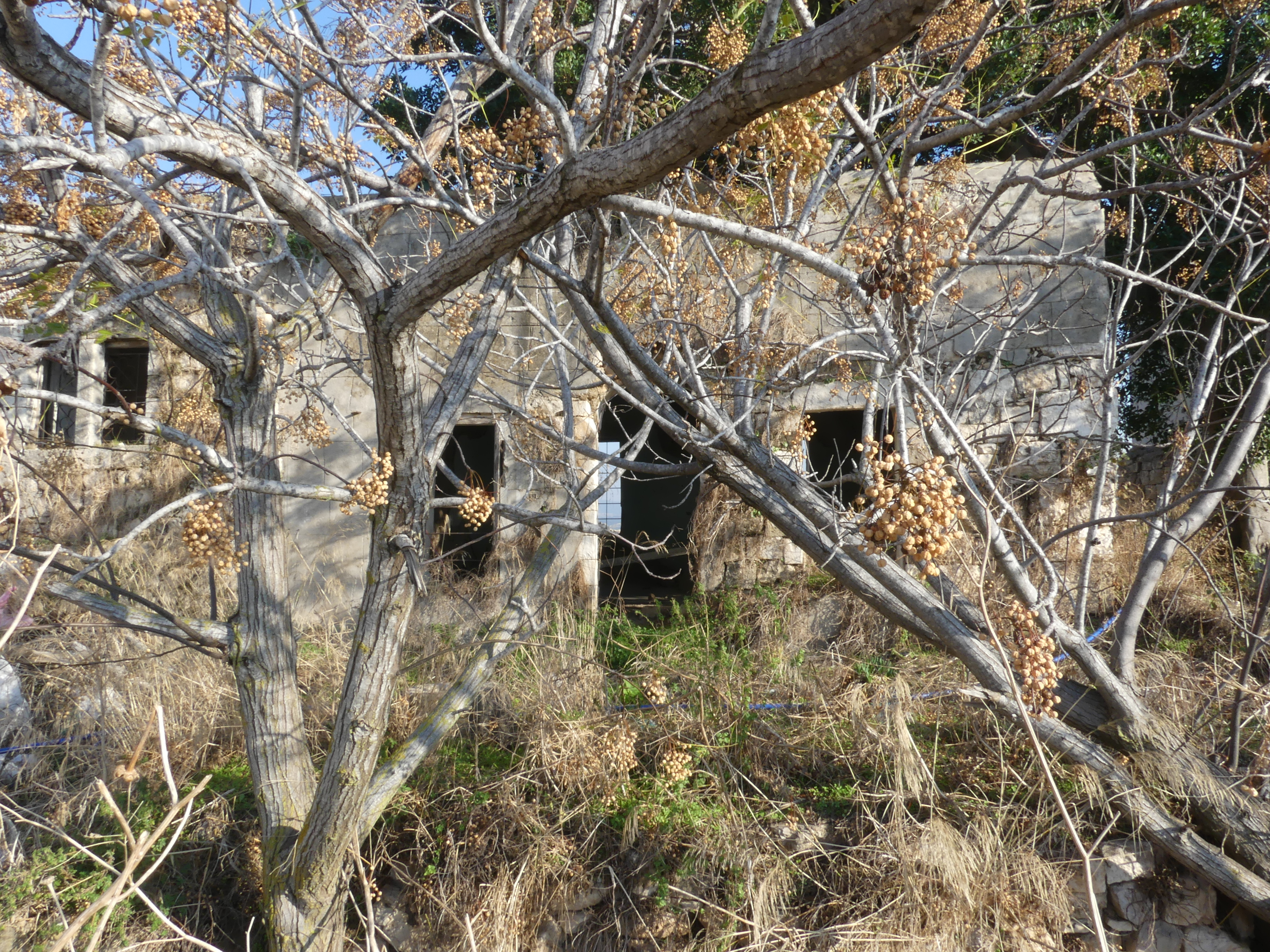
Modern ruins inside the castle's courtyard

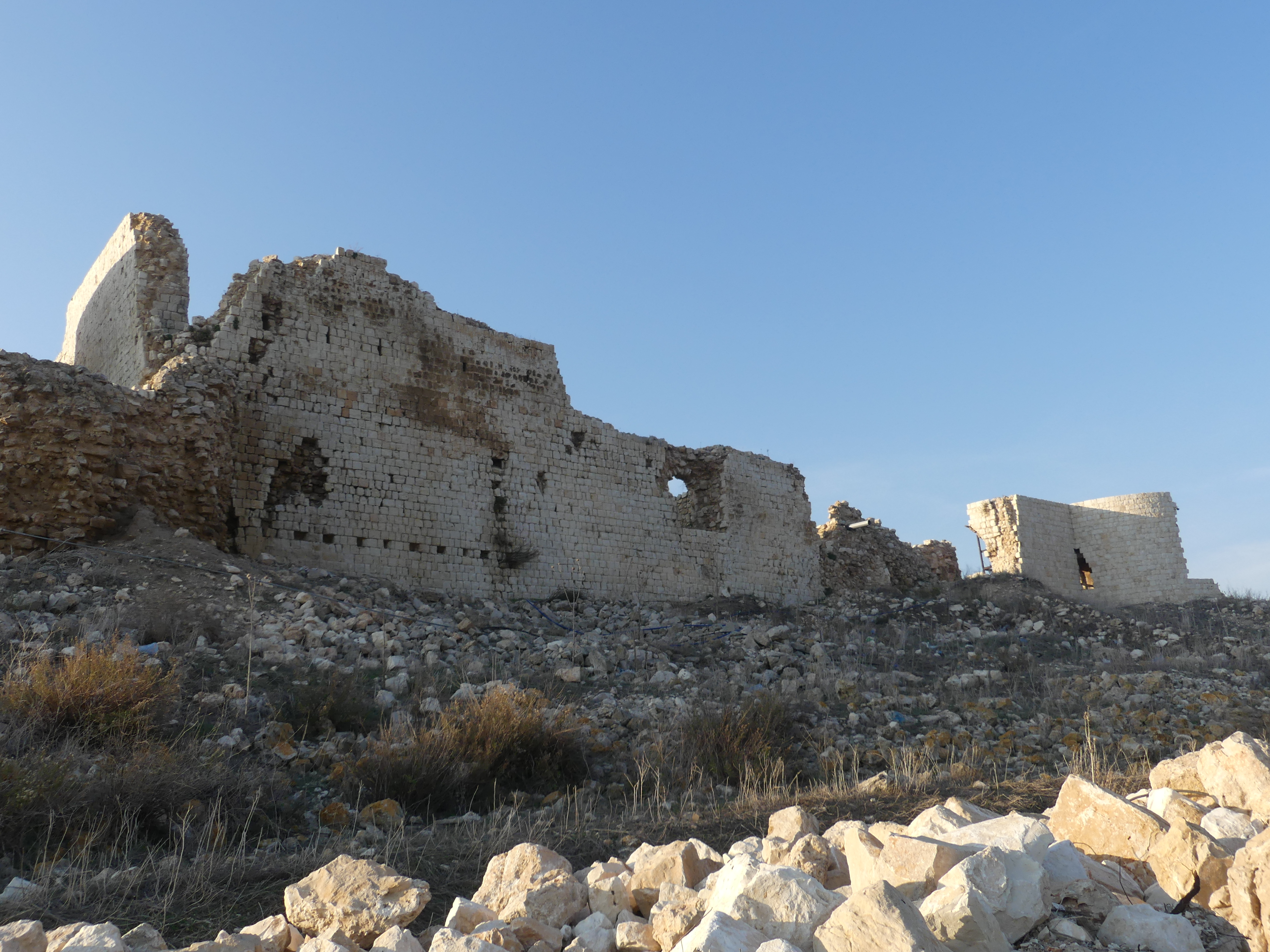
The northeastern side from below

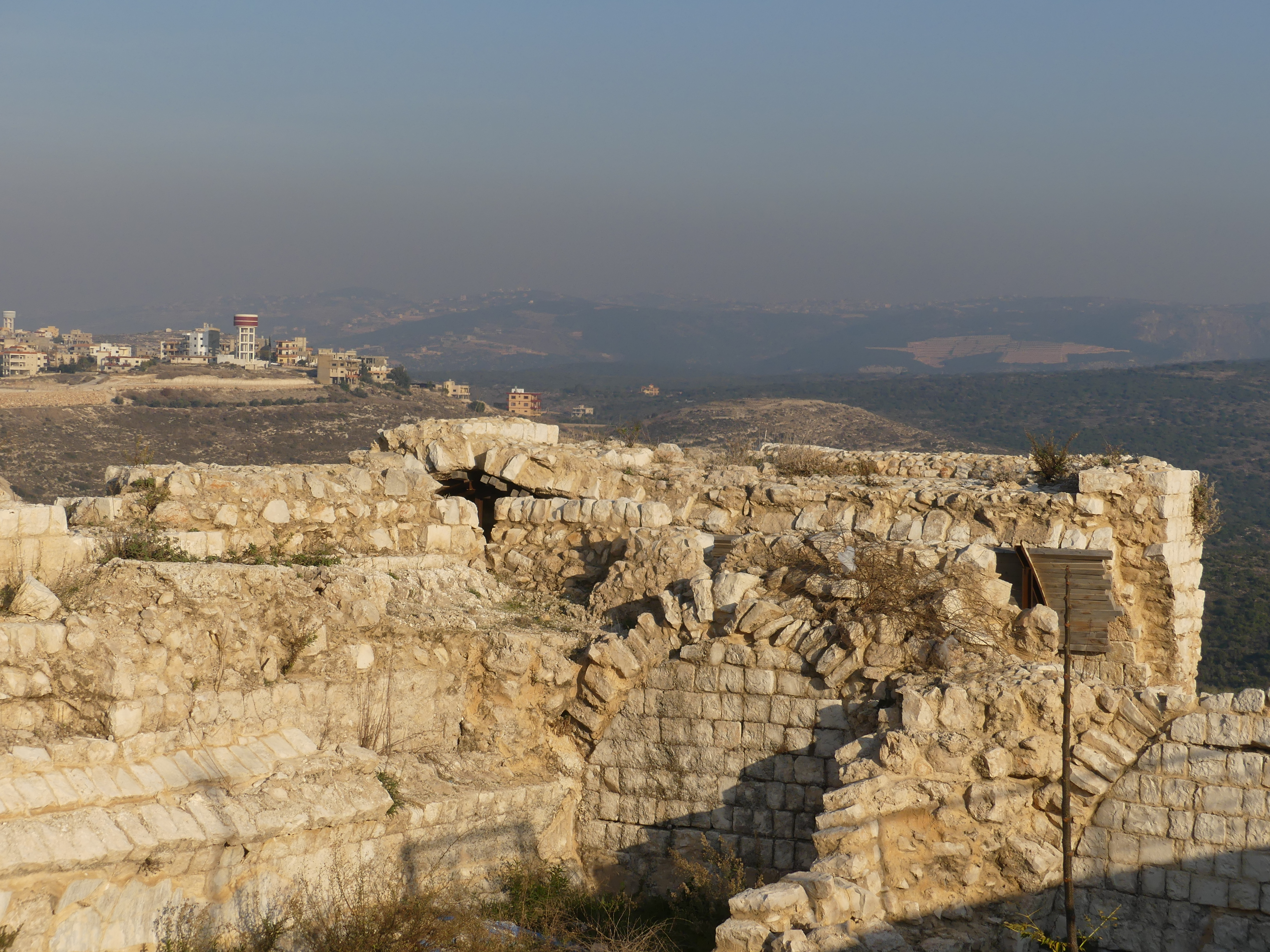
The northeastern corner

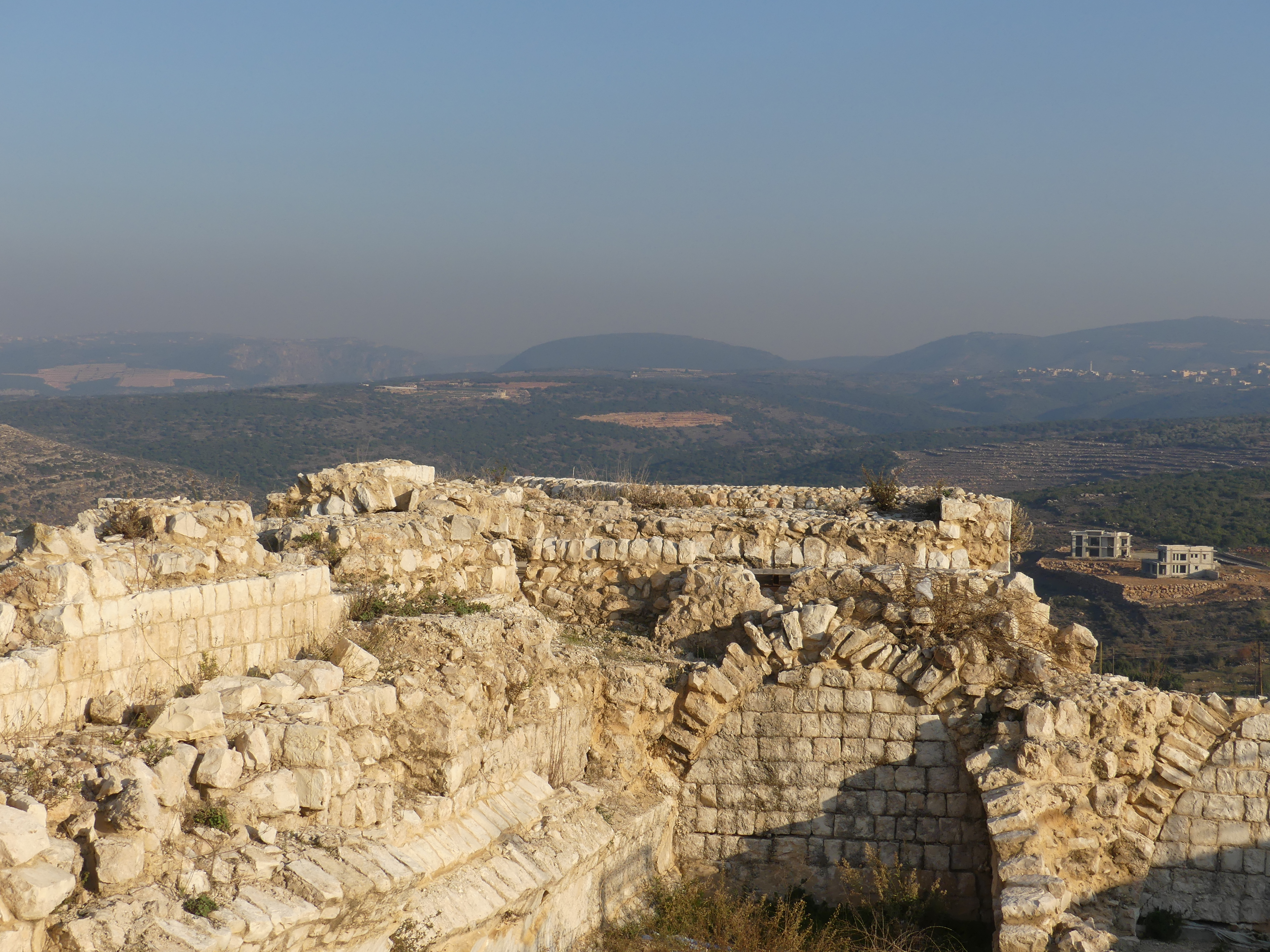
More ruins at the northeastern side

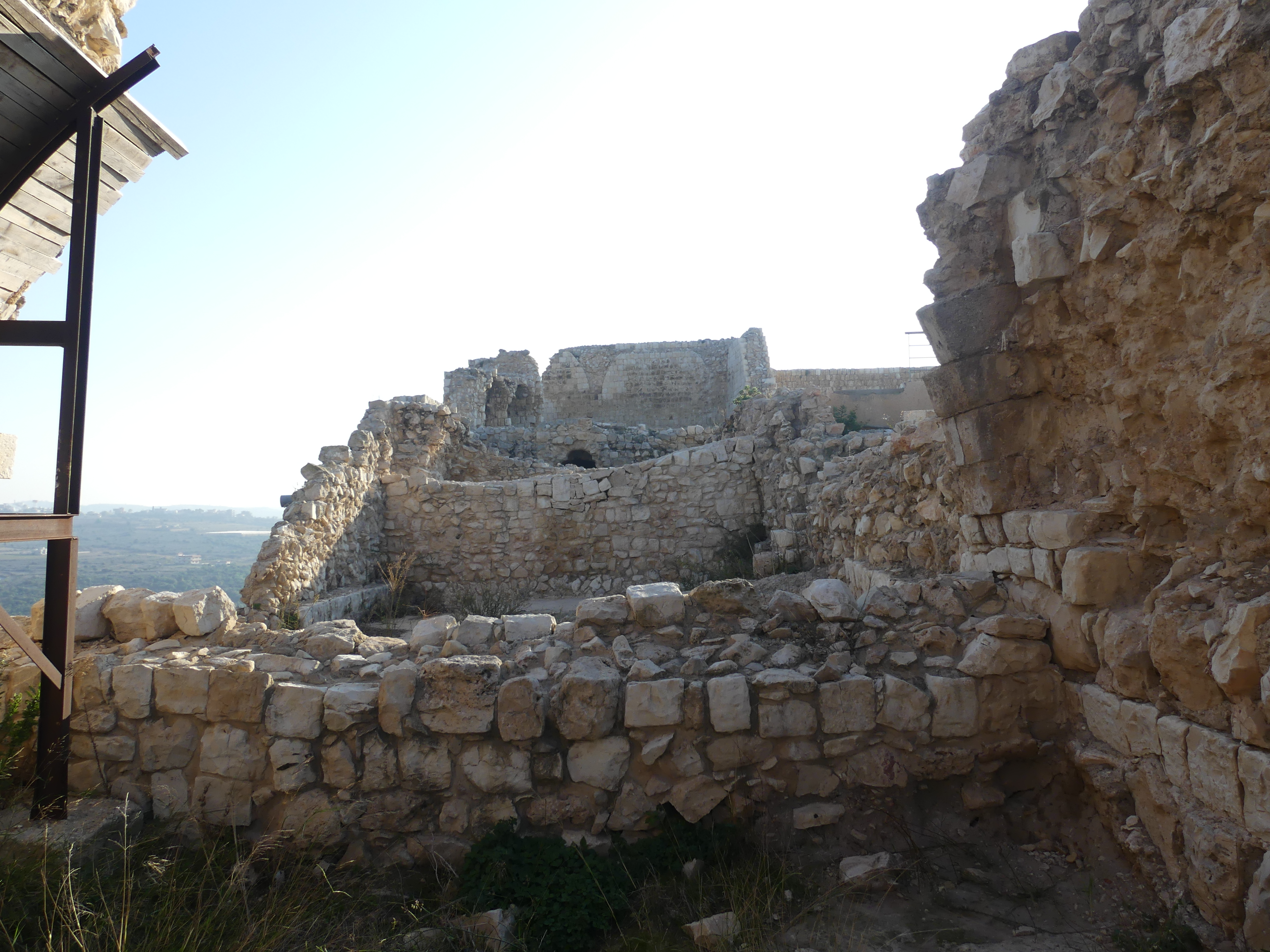
Eastern side, looking southwards

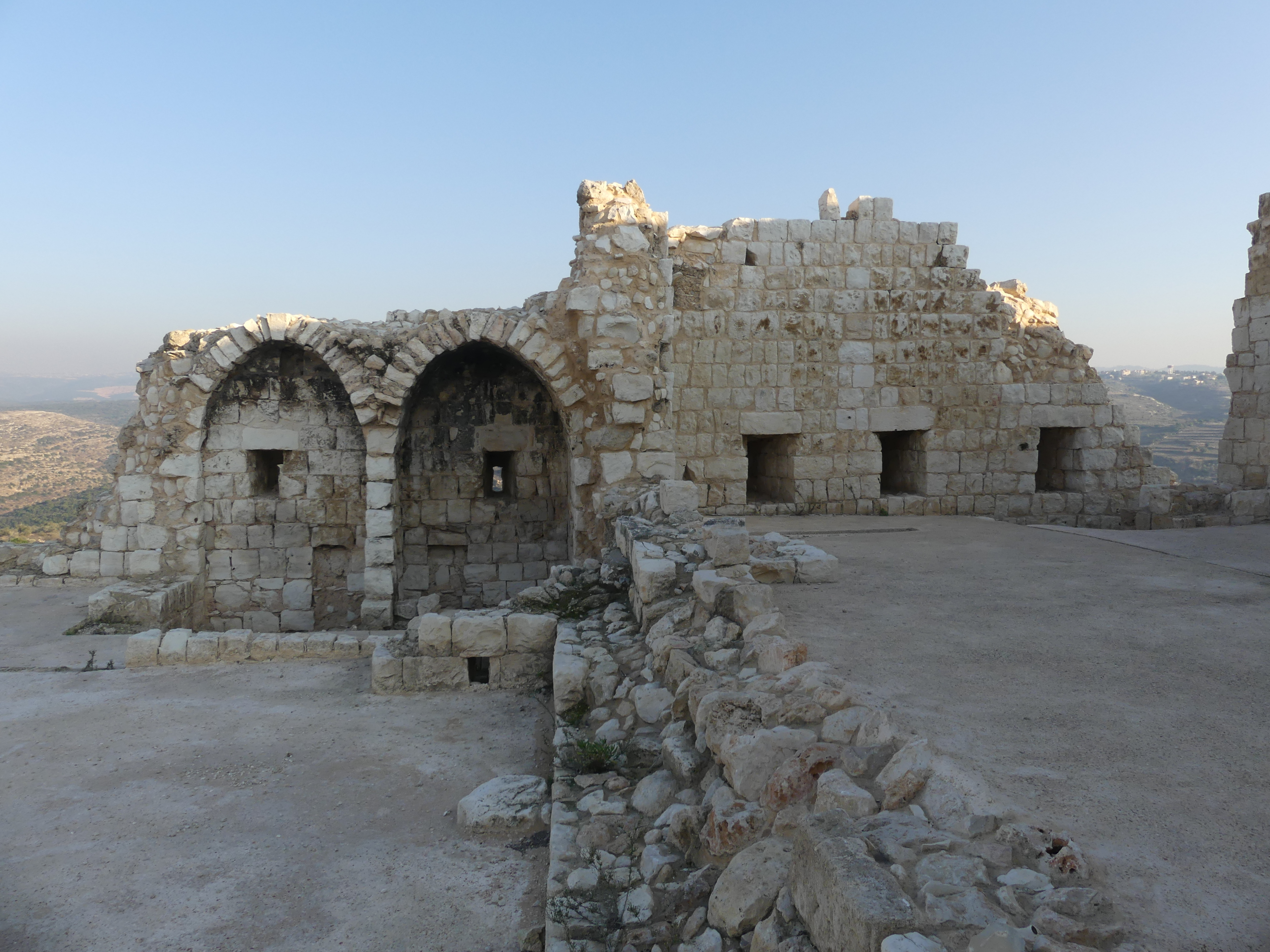
Centre of the eastern side
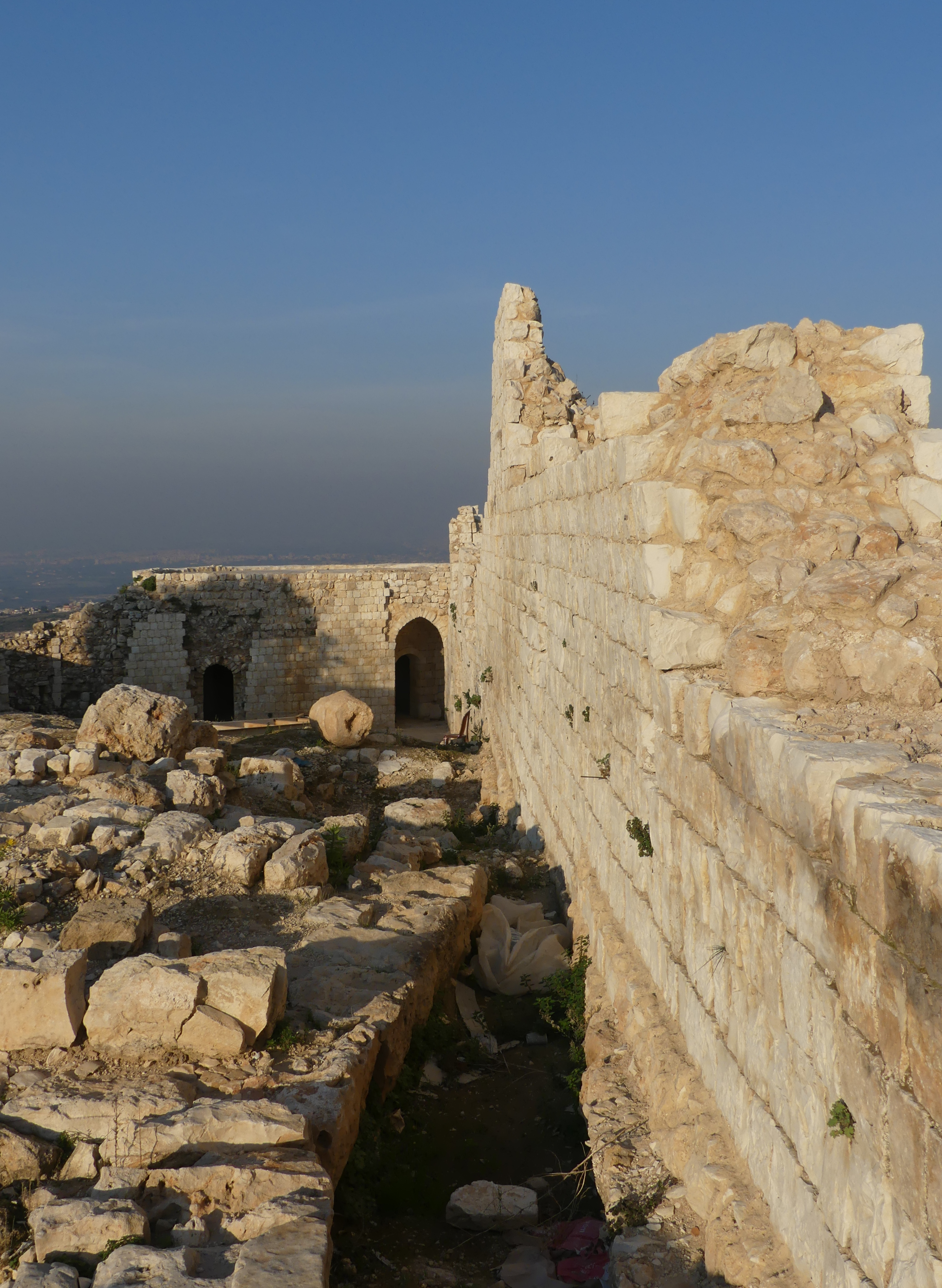
Ruins in the northwestern part of the courtyard

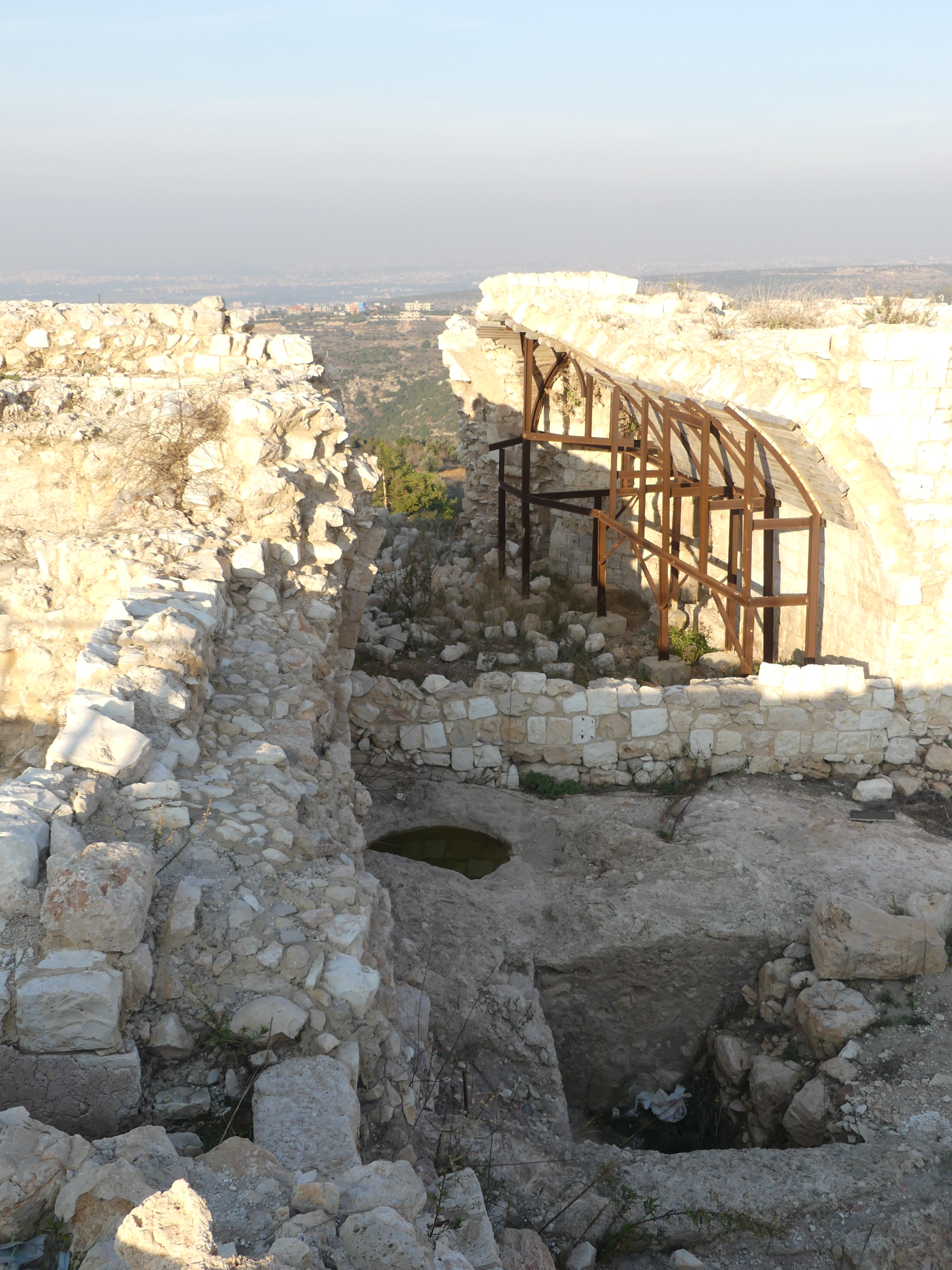
Ruins in the northeastern part of the courtyard

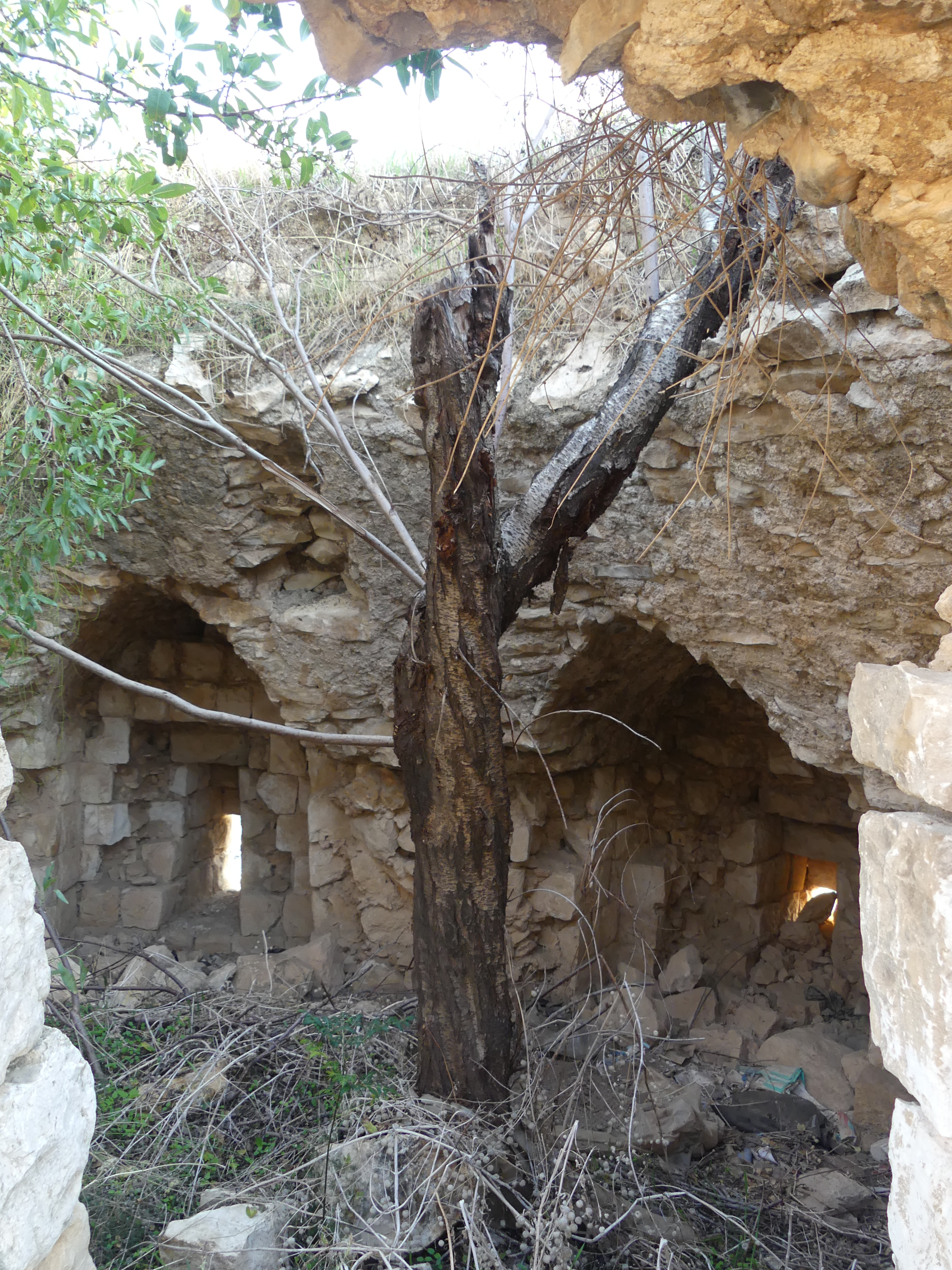
Overgrown ruins of the southeasternmost tower

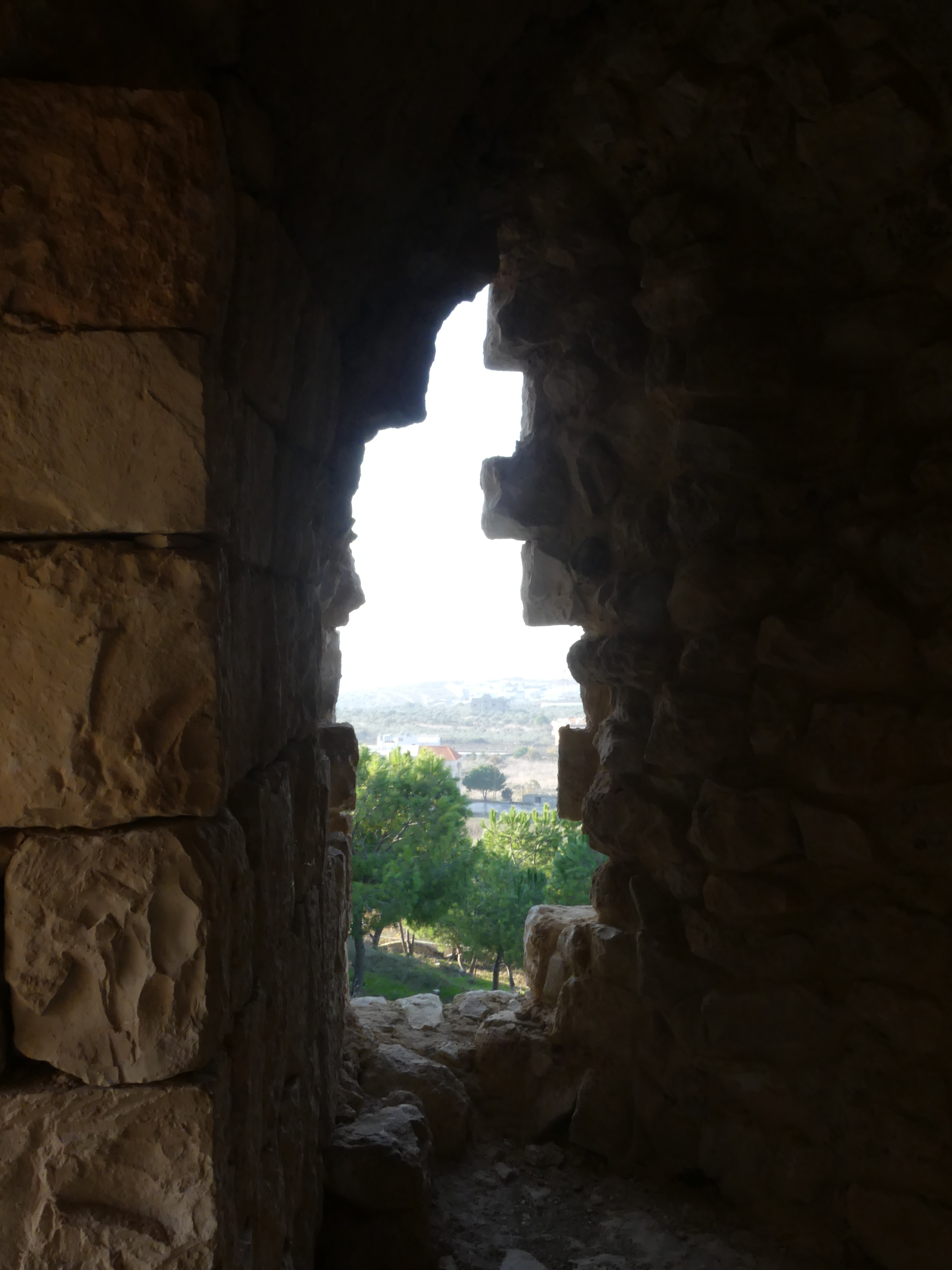
Embrasure in the northwestern tower

== Bibliography ==
- Conder, C.R.; Kitchener, H.H. (1881). The Survey of Western Palestine: Memoirs of the Topography, Orography, Hydrography, and Archaeology. Vol. 1. London: Committee of the Palestine Exploration Fund.
- Guérin, V. (1880). Description Géographique Historique et Archéologique de la Palestine (in French). Vol. 3: Galilee, pt. 2. Paris: L'Imprimerie Nationale.
- Hütteroth, W.-D.; Abdulfattah, K. (1977). Historical Geography of Palestine, Transjordan and Southern Syria in the Late 16th Century. Erlanger Geographische Arbeiten, Sonderband 5. Erlangen, Germany: Vorstand der Fränkischen Geographischen Gesellschaft. ISBN 3-920405-41-2.
- Palmer, E.H. (1881). The Survey of Western Palestine: Arabic and English Name Lists Collected During the Survey by Lieutenants Conder and Kitchener, R. E. Transliterated and Explained by E.H. Palmer. Committee of the Palestine Exploration Fund.
- Rhode, H. (1979). Administration and Population of the Sancak of Safed in the Sixteenth Century (PhD). Columbia University. Archived from the original on 2020-03-01.
