= Sham Raj =

Sham Raj may refer to

- Sham Raj I (1765-1822), Prime Minister of Hyderabad
- Sham Raj II (1898-1987), An Indian noble and Member of H. E. H the Nizam's executive council.
