= Shamma =

Shamma (Arabic: شمّا) is a surname. Notable people with the surname include:

- Jeff S. Shamma (born c. 1961), American control theorist
- Naseer Shamma (born 1963), Iraqi musician and oud player
- Sara Shamma (born 1975), Syrian artist

== See also ==
- Shama (disambiguation)
- Shamaa (disambiguation)
