= Chamas =

Chamas (Arabic: شمص) is an Arabic language surname. Notable people with the surname include:

- Mohamad Chamas, Lebanese actor
- Samir Chamas (born 1942), Lebanese actor, writer, journalist and voice actor
