= Sham Maskari =

Hisham Al Maskari, known professionally as Sham Maskari, is an Omani rapper, singer and songwriter. He is the first rapper from the Middle East to launch an English language album in the US.

== Early life ==
Maskari was born in Muscat, Oman. He is one of five children of an Omani father and British mother. Maskari's father, Hamood Al Maskari, is known as the first major nightclub DJ in Oman. At the age of 15 Sham began writing his own songs and participating in talent contests. He completed a degree in business management in Malaysia before pursuing a career in music.

== Career ==
After completing his studies, Maskari broke into the music scene in Malaysia, mentored by Yasien, a Malaysian-based producer. At age 21, he relocated to the UK where he performed at various clubs across the country and collaborated with local DJs. In 2005, Maskari moved to Dubai, where he partnered with producer Salim Rashaad, known professionally as Sal. He also secured financial backing from Omani businessman Munim Zawawi. With the help of Sal and Zawawi, Maskari's first single, 'Naughty Boy', reached number one on Radio One's top playlist. In 2008, Maskari's track 'One and Only' reached number one on MTV Asia/Arabia.

In 2010, Maskari performed at the closing ceremony of the 2nd Asian Beach Games in Mussanah, Oman.

Maskari was the first artist from the Middle East to sign with US-based publishing and distribution company Tale Music Group (TMG), releasing his second album 'Take Your Body Over' in Los Angeles in 2014. Throughout his career Maskari has performed with international artists including Akon, Ne-Yo, Sean Paul, Jay Sean, Shaggy, Omarion, and Lloyd.

== Artistry ==
Sham cites that he grew up listening to artists such as Michael Jackson, 2Pac, Biggie Smalls, R. Kelly, and Dr. Dre, all of whom later inspired his music. He describes his style as 'a mix of singing and rap' as well as 'soft RnB' and 'feel good music.'

== See also ==
- Lists of musicians
- List of Omani singers
