= Iskandarounah =

Iskandarounah اسكندرونا
- populated place
- Location within Lebanon
- Coordinates: 33°09′16″N 35°09′58″E
- Grid position: 169/283 PAL
- Country: Lebanon
- Governorate: South Governorate
- District: Tyre District
- Elevation: 10 m (33 ft)
- Time zone: EET

Iskandarounah (Arabic: اسكندرونا) is a populated place in the coastal area of the Tyre District of Lebanon's South Governorate. Iskandarounah was named after Alexander the Great. Iskandarounah is known for the Iskandarounah Beach and the historic Iskandarounah Castle. Iskandarounah Castle is a crusader castle that was built in 1124 to defend the city of Tyre and its surroundings.
