= Syria (disambiguation) =

Syria is a country in the West Asia, incorporating the northern Levant.

Syria may also refer to:

== Geography and history ==
Syria (region) refers to a wider historical geographic region. In this sense it can refer to:

=== In modern Middle East ===
- Arab Kingdom of Syria, a short-lived Hashemite kingdom in 1920, installed after World War I and abolished by the French
- French Mandate for Syria and the Lebanon, incorporating the:
  - State of Syria (1924–30), Mandatory proto-state, a progenitor of Mandatory Syrian Republic
- First Syrian Republic, the government of Syria from 1930 to 1950
- Second Syrian Republic, the government of Syria from 1950 to 1963
- Ba'athist Syria, the government of Syria from 1963 to 2024
- Syria, a modern day UN member country
  - Autonomous Administration of North and East Syria, a self-proclaimed autonomous region in Northern Syria
- Hay'at Tahrir al-Sham
- Turkish occupation of northern Syria
- Territory of the Islamic State of Iraq and Syria

=== Ancient and classic Near East ===
- Neo-Hittite states, during the Early Iron Age
- Coele-Syria, a province of the Seleucid Empire and the coastal Levantine province of the Roman Empire split from Syria Palaestina in the late 2nd century CE
- Roman Syria, a Roman province between 64 BCE and 135 CE
- Syria Palaestina, a Roman province between 135 CE and 390 CE
- Byzantine Syria, a sub-region within Byzantine Diocese of the East
  - Syria Prima, a province of the Byzantine Empire, transformed from former Roman Syria
  - Syria-Coele (Roman province), a province of the Byzantine Empire, transformed from former Roman Syria
- Bilad al-Sham, a province of the early Caliphates, corresponding to former Byzantine Syria
- Ottoman Syria, a geopolitical region of Levantine provinces of the Ottoman Empire
  - Damascus Eyalet until 19th century
  - Syria Vilayet after the Tanzimat reforms in 19th century

=== Incorporation of the geographic term Syria outside of the Middle East ===
- Little Syria, Manhattan, a neighborhood that existed in New York City, United States of America
- Șiria, a commune in Arad County, Romania
- Syria, Virginia, a town in the United States
- Syria Planum, a plateau in the Tharsis region of Mars

== Art, entertainment, and media ==
- Syria (journal), an academic journal covering Semitic Middle East history
- Siria, a music duo
- Syria (singer), the pseudonym of Cecilia Cipressi, an Italian singer-songwriter
- Syria TV, national television channel of Syria

== Other uses ==
- Syria (ship), sailing ship launched in 1868
- Greater Syria, either an Arab nationalistic term to define large parts of the Middle East or another name for the Syrian region

== See also ==
- Name of Syria
- Syriac (disambiguation)
- Syriac language
- Syrian (disambiguation)
- Shaam (disambiguation)
- Sham (disambiguation)
