= Shyamlal =

Shyamlal is a given name. Notable people with the name include:

- Shyamlal Gupta (1896–1977), Indian poet and lyricist
- Shyamal Sinha (Shyamlal Sinha, 1930–1963), Indian cricketer
- Shyamlal Yadav (1927–2005), Indian politician
