= Karshoni =

Variant of the Syriac alphabet with additional letters for Malayalam.

Suriyāni Malayalam alphabet ܣܘܼܪܝܼܝܵࡥܝܼ ܡܲܠܲܝܵࡨܲܡ ܠܝ݂ܦܝ݂ suriyāni malayāḷaṁ lipi
- Suriyani Malayalam Alphabet Chart divided into the invocation (ܝ ܀ ܡ ܀ ܝ) at the very top, 22 Syriac letters (ܣܘܼܪܝܼܝܵࡥܝܼ ܐܲܟࡪܲࡧܲࡠ̱ܲࡨ), 11 Malayalam Karshon letters (ܡܲܠܲܝܵࡨܲܡ ܟܲܪܫܘܿܢ ܐܲܟࡪܲࡧܲࡠ̱ܲࡨ), 11 Vowel diacritics (ܣܒ݂ܲࡧܲܫ݁ܝܼܗࡥܲࡠ̱ܲࡨ), 5 consonant modifiers, 2 special Syriac characters and 2 ligated conjuncts unique to Karshoni
- Script type: Abjad
- Direction: Right-to-left script
- Languages: Aramaic (Classical Syriac); Suriyani Malayalam

Related scripts
- Parent systems: Egyptian hieroglyphs: Proto-Sinaitic script; Phoenician alphabet; Aramaic alphabet; Syriac alphabet; Suriyāni Malayalam alphabet

Unicode
- Unicode range: U+0700–U+074F Syriac; U+0860–U+086F Syriac Supplement

Malayalam Karshon (Malayalam: മലയാളം കർശോൻ, Karshoni: ܡܲܠܲܝܵࡨܲܡ ܟܲܪܫܘܿܢ), also known as Karshoni, Karshon or Suriyani Malayalam script, is a hybrid impure abjad and variant form of the Syriac alphabet which was popular among the Saint Thomas Christians (also known as Syrian Christians or Nasranis) of Kerala in India. It was used to write religious literature in Suriyani Malayalam, a literary dialect of Malayalam. It was derived from the Maḏnḥāyā (or "Eastern") Syriac script, with special orthographic features and additional letters to accommodate vocabulary from both Malayalam and East Syriac. Until the 19th century, Syrian Christians in Kerala widely used the script.

Karshoni is a unicameral impure abjad written right to left, comprising 33 basic letters with diacritics denoting vowels and attested ligatures unique to the script.

== Etymology ==
The name Karshoni is derived from the word Garshuni or Karshuni (Syriac alphabet: ܓܪܫܘܢܝ, Arabic alphabet: كرشوني) which denotes the usage of the Syriac alphabet to write or transcribe non-Syriac languages, most often being Arabic or Malayalam. The word Garshuni was used by George Kiraz to coin the term "garshunography", denoting the writing of one language in the script of another.

== Letters ==
Ittimani Kathanar's transcription of the AD 849 Tharisappally Copper Plates into Karshon Malayalam in 1601 AD.

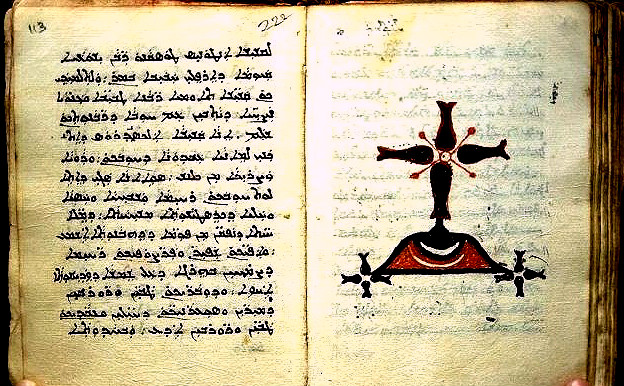
East Syriac Rite Thaksa (Liturgy of Addai and Mari) in Maḏnḥāyā Syriac (from the Chaldean Syrian Church, Thrissur, Kerala)

Signature of Syro-Malabar Venerable Varghese Payyappilly in Syriac script

Karshoni is a hybrid script consisting of Semitic Syriac letters extended with Brahmi-derived letters for Indic phonemes. It is an impure abjad, written from right to left with eastern style (Maḏnḥāyā) dots and diacritic marks to indicate vowels.

The Syriac script, which was designed for Semitic languages, had only 22 letters to render at least 53 or so phonemes of Malayalam. This problem was overcome by adopting letters from the various archaic regional varieties/sister scripts of the modern Malayalam script like Koleluttu and Malayanma. This practice of intermixing multiple script graphemes to account for local phonetics was common in medieval Kerala. The modern Malayalam script itself was born from the intermixing and modification of the archaic Arya ezhuthu with Vatteluttu characters by poet Thunchaththu Ezhuthachan. However, the aspirates of modern Malayalam are not clearly distinguished in classical Karshoni texts, as the script's usage diminished by the 19th c.e. before it could be standardised.

=== Consonants ===
Basic Syriac ʾĀlap̄ Bēṯ and their corresponding Malayalam letters are as follows:

ܕ	ܓ	ܒ	ܐ
ദ്	ഗ്	ബ്, വ്	അ
ܚ	ܙ	ܘ	ܗ
ഹ്	സ്	വ്	ഹ്
ܠ	ܟ	ܝ	ܛ
ൽ	ക്, ക്ക്	യ്	ത്
ܥ	ܣ	ܢ	ܡ
അ	സ്	ൻ	മ്
ܪ	ܩ	ܨ	ܦ
ർ	ഖ്	സ്	പ്, വ്
		ܬ	ܫ
		ത്, സ്	ശ്

To render Dravidian phonemes of Malayalam, additional letters were incorporated from the regional scripts used in Central Kerala like Malayanma or Thekkan Malayalam (trans: Southern Malayalam), and Koleluttu. Except for letters ࡦ (Malayalam /bʱ/) and ࡡ (Malayalam /d͡ʒ~d͡ʑ/), which were directly derived from Arya Ezhuthu at a later stage, these new letters exhibit contextual forms and joining features similar to abjads.

ട്	ഞ്	ജ്	ങ്
ര്	ഭ്	ഩ*	ൺ
	ഷ്	ഴ്	ൾ

* Malayalam alveolar nasal encoded as U+0D29 for scholarly purposes.

=== Vowels ===
Because Karshoni was modelled on the Maḏnḥāyā (ܡܲܕ݂ܢܚܵܝܵܐ, 'Eastern') form of the alphabet, it uses a system of dots above and/or below letters, based on an older system, to indicate vowel sounds not found in the script:

- A dot above and a dot below a letter represent [a], transliterated as a or ă (called ܦܬ݂ܵܚܵܐ, pṯāḥā), (sometimes a dot above only)
- Two diagonally-placed dots above a letter represent [ɑ], transliterated as ā or â or å (called ܙܩܵܦ݂ܵܐ, zqāp̄ā),
- Two horizontally-placed dots below a letter represent [ɛ], transliterated as e or ĕ (called ܪܒ݂ܵܨܵܐ ܐܲܪܝܼܟ݂ܵܐ, rḇāṣā ʾărīḵā or ܙܠܵܡܵܐ ܦܫܝܼܩܵܐ, zlāmā pšīqā; often pronounced [ɪ] and transliterated as i in the East Syriac dialect),
- Two diagonally-placed dots below a letter represent [e], transliterated as ē (called ܪܒ݂ܵܨܵܐ ܟܲܪܝܵܐ, rḇāṣā karyā or ܙܠܵܡܵܐ ܩܲܫܝܵܐ, zlāmā qašyā),
- (ܘܼ) The letter waw with a dot below it represents [u], transliterated as ū or u (called ܥܨܵܨܵܐ ܐܲܠܝܼܨܵܐ, ʿṣāṣā ʾălīṣā or ܪܒ݂ܵܨܵܐ, rḇāṣā),
- (ܘܿ) The letter waw with a dot above it represents [o], transliterated as ō or o (called ܥܨܵܨܵܐ ܪܘܝܼܚܵܐ, ʿṣāṣā rwīḥā or ܪܘܵܚܵܐ, rwāḥā),
- (ܝܼ) The letter yōḏ with a dot beneath it represents [i], transliterated as ī or i (called ܚܒ݂ܵܨܵܐ, ḥḇāṣā),
- A combination of rḇāṣā karyā (usually) followed by a letter yōḏ represents [e] (possibly *[e̝] in Proto-Syriac), transliterated as ē or ê (called ܐܲܣܵܩܵܐ, ʾăsāqā).

ܘ݁	ܹ	ܸ	ܘ݂	ܝ݂	ܵ	ܲ
ഒ, ഓ	ഏ	എ	ഉ, ഊ	ഇ, ഈ	ആ	അ
ܟܘ݁	ܟܹ	ܟܸ	ܟܘ݂	ܟܝ݂	ܟܵ	ܟܲ
കൊ, കോ	കേ	കെ	കു, കൂ	കി, കീ	കാ	ക

This system mirrored the usage of extensive ḥarakāt (حَرَكَات) marks to denote Malayalam phonetics in Arabi Malayalam.

== Contextual Letter forms ==
=== Malayalam Karshon letters ===
The following are the contextual variants of the additional Malayalam Karshon characters.

Isolated form	Contextual forms			Name	Romanized	IPA	Malayalam letter	Notes
Isolated form	Initial	Medial	Final	Name	Romanized	IPA	Malayalam letter	Notes
				Suriyani Malayalam NGA	ṅa	/ŋ/	ങ	Derived from the Malayanma script. Exhibits dual joining behaviour.
	-	-	-	Suriyani Malayalam JA	ja	/d͡ʒ/	ജ	Directly derived from Arya ezhuttu at a later stage in the script's development. This letter exists as a standalone letter and does not join with other characters.
				Suriyani Malayalam NJA	ña	/ɲ/	ഞ	Derived from the Malayanma script. Exhibits dual joining behaviour.
				Suriyani Malayalam TTA	ṭa	/ʈ/	ട	Derived from the Malayanma script. Exhibits dual joining behaviour.
				Suriyani Malayalam NNA	ṇa	/ɳ/	ണ	Derived from the Malayanma script. Exhibits dual joining behaviour.
				Suriyani Malayalam NNNA	ṉa	/n/	ഩ	This letter represents the alveolar nasal /n/, which used to be denoted by the archaic Malayalam letter ഩ. Derived from the Malayanma script. Exhibits dual joining behaviour.
	-	-	-	Suriyani Malayalam BHA	bha	/bʱ/	ഭ	Directly derived from Arya ezhuttu at a later stage in the script's development. This letter exists as a standalone letter and does not join with other characters.
	-	-		Suriyani Malayalam RA	ra	/ɾ/	ര	Derived from the Malayanma script. Exhibits finial joining behaviour.
	-	-		Suriyani Malayalam LLA	ḷa	/ɭ/	ള	Derived from the Malayanma script. Exhibits finial joining behaviour.
	-	-		Suriyani Malayalam LLLA	ḻa	/ɻ/	ഴ	Derived from the Malayanma script. Exhibits finial joining behaviour.
	-	-		Suriyani Malayalam SSA	ṣa	/ʂ/	ഷ	Derived from the Malayanma script. Exhibits finial joining behaviour.

=== Ligatures ===
The following are the ligated conjuncts of Malayalam Karshon attested in manuscripts.

Isolated form	Contextual forms			Karshon	Romanized	IPA	Malayalam equivalent	Notes
Isolated form	Initial	Medial	Final	Karshon	Romanized	IPA	Malayalam equivalent	Notes
	-	-	-	ܝܼࡡࡢ	jñī	/d͡ʒɲiː/	ജ്ഞീ	This conjunct form of the syllable jñī is only attested twice in a single manuscript to write the word രാജ്ഞീ (transl: Queen). Directly derived from the Arya ezhuttu form of ജ്ഞീ, instead of the Syriac Malayalam letter ࡢ, including the vowel sign ീ. This conjunct exists as a standalone letter and does not join with other characters.
				ࡤࡣ	ṇṭa	/ɳʈ/	ണ്ട	A conjunct ligature of the letters ࡤ and ࡣ. Exhibits dual joining behaviour.
	-	-	-	ࡧܢ	-ran	/ɾən̪/	രൻ	A conjunct ligature of the letters ࡤ and ࡣ. Denotes the suffix -രൻ in words like ദൈവകുമാരൻ (transl: Son of God). Exhibits final joining behaviour from the right.

== Unicode ==
The Syriac alphabet was added to the Unicode Standard in September, 1999 with the release of version 3.0. Additional letters for Suriyani Malayalam were added in June, 2017 with the release of version 10.0.

=== Blocks ===
The Unicode block for Syriac is U+0700–U+074F:

Syriac^{[1]}^{[2]} Official Unicode Consortium code chart (PDF)
	0	1	2	3	4	5	6	7	8	9	A	B	C	D	E	F
U+070x	܀	܁	܂	܃	܄	܅	܆	܇	܈	܉	܊	܋	܌	܍		SAM
U+071x	ܐ	ܑ	ܒ	ܓ	ܔ	ܕ	ܖ	ܗ	ܘ	ܙ	ܚ	ܛ	ܜ	ܝ	ܞ	ܟ
U+072x	ܠ	ܡ	ܢ	ܣ	ܤ	ܥ	ܦ	ܧ	ܨ	ܩ	ܪ	ܫ	ܬ	ܭ	ܮ	ܯ
U+073x	ܰ	ܱ	ܲ	ܳ	ܴ	ܵ	ܶ	ܷ	ܸ	ܹ	ܺ	ܻ	ܼ	ܽ	ܾ	ܿ
U+074x	݀	݁	݂	݃	݄	݅	݆	݇	݈	݉	݊			ݍ	ݎ	ݏ
Notes 1.As of Unicode version 18.0 2.Grey areas indicate non-assigned code points

The Syriac Abbreviation (a type of overline) can be represented with a special control character called the Syriac Abbreviation Mark (U+070F).

The Unicode block for Suriyani Malayalam specific letters is called the Syriac Supplement block and is U+0860–U+086F:

Syriac Supplement^{[1]}^{[2]} Official Unicode Consortium code chart (PDF)
	0	1	2	3	4	5	6	7	8	9	A	B	C	D	E	F
U+086x	ࡠ	ࡡ	ࡢ	ࡣ	ࡤ	ࡥ	ࡦ	ࡧ	ࡨ	ࡩ	ࡪ					
Notes 1.As of Unicode version 18.0 2.Grey areas indicate non-assigned code points

== Sample Text ==
The following text is Article 1 of the Universal Declaration of Human Rights.

=== English ===
All human beings are born free and equal in dignity and rights. They are endowed with reason and conscience and should act towards one another in a spirit of brotherhood.

=== Karshoni ===
ܐܘܿࡥ̱ܵܡ ܒ݂ܲܟܘܼܦ̱: ܡܲࡥܘܼࡪܝܲࡧܸܠ̱ܵܒ݂ܲࡧܘܼܡ ܬܘܼܠܝܵܒ݂ܲܟܵܫܲࡠ̱ܲࡨܘܿࡣܘܼܡ ܐܲࡥܬܲܣ̱ܘܿࡣܘܼܡ ܣܒ݂ܵܬܲࡥܬࡧܝܲܬ̱ܘܿࡣܘܼܡܟܘܼࡣܝܼ ࡡܲࡥܝܼܫ݁ܝܼࡣ̱ܘܼࡨ̱ܲܒ݂ܲࡧܵࡤ. ܐܲࡥܝܘܿࡥܝܲܡ ࡦࡧܵܬܪܲࡦܵܒ݂ܲܬ̱ܘܿࡣܸ ܦܸࡧܘܼܡܵܪܘܼܒ݂ܵࡥܵࡤ ܡܲࡥܘܼࡪܝܲࡥ ܒ݂ܝܼܒ݂ܹܟܲܒܘܼܕܕ̃ܝܼܝܘܼܡ ܡܲࡥܲܣܵܟࡪܝܼܝܘܼܡ ܣܝܼܕܕ̃ܲܡܵܝܝܼࡧܝܼܟ̱ܘܼࡥ̱ܲܬ܀

=== Malayalam ===
ഒന്നാം വകുപ്പ്: മനുഷ്യരെല്ലാവരും തുല്യാവകാശങ്ങളോടും അന്തസ്സോടും സ്വാതന്ത്ര്യത്തോടുംകൂടി ജനിച്ചിട്ടുള്ളവരാണ്‌. അന്യോന്യം ഭ്രാതൃഭാവത്തോടെ പെരുമാറുവാനാണ്‌ മനുഷ്യന് വിവേകബുദ്ധിയും മനസാക്ഷിയും സിദ്ധമായിരിക്കുന്നത്‌.

=== Romanisation (ISO 15919) ===
onnāṁ vakuppŭ: manuṣyarellāvaruṁ tulyāvakāśaṅṅaḷōṭuṁ antassōṭuṁ svātantryattōṭuṅkūṭi janicciṭṭuḷḷavarāṇŭ. anyōnyaṁ bhrātr̥bhāvattōṭe perumāṟuvānāṇŭ manuṣyanŭ vivēkabuddhiyuṁ manasākṣiyuṁ siddhamāyirikkunnatŭ.

=== Malayalam IPA ===
[on̪n̪ɑ̃ː ʋəkuppɨ̆ manuʂjaɾellaːʋaɾum t̪uljaːʋakaːʃaŋŋaɭoːʈum an̪t̪assoːʈum sʋaːt̪an̪t̪rjat̪t̪oːʈuŋkuːʈi d͡ʒanit͡ʃt͡ʃiʈʈuɭɭaʋaɾaːɳɨ̆ ǁ anjoːnjam bʱraːt̪rɨ̆bʱaːʋat̪t̪oːʈe peɾumaːruʋaːnaːɳɨ̆ manuʂjanɨ̆ ʋiʋeːkabud̪d̪ʱijum manasaːkʂijum sid̪d̪ʱamaːjiɾikkun̪ːat̪ɨ̆ ǁ]

== See also ==
- Suriyani Malayalam
- Arabi Malayalam script
- Garshuni
