= West Syrian =

The term West Syrian or Western Syrian may refer to:

- western parts of the modern state of Syria
- western parts of historical region of Syria
- West Syrian Rite, alternative term for the West Syriac Rite
- West Syrian script, imprecise term for the West Syriac script
- West Syrian dialects, imprecise term for the West Syriac dialects

== See also ==
- East Syrian (disambiguation)
- Syria (disambiguation)
- Syrian (disambiguation)
- Syriac (disambiguation)
- West Syriac (disambiguation)
- Syriac Rite (disambiguation)
