= East Syrian =

The term East Syrian or Eastern Syrian may refer to:

- eastern parts of the modern state of Syria
- eastern parts of historical region of Syria
- East Syrian Rite, alternative term for the East Syriac Rite
- East Syrian script, imprecise term for the East Syriac script
- East Syrian dialects, imprecise term for the East Syriac dialects

== See also ==
- West Syrian (disambiguation)
- Syria (disambiguation)
- Syrian (disambiguation)
- Syriac (disambiguation)
- East Syriac (disambiguation)
- Syriac Rite (disambiguation)
