= Syriac Church =

Syriac Church may refer to:

- any Christian denomination within the scope of Syriac Christianity, including:

- Syriac Churches that employ East Syriac Rite
  - Syriac Church of the East, an ancient Christian denomination
  - Syro-Chaldean Catholic Church, an Eastern Catholic denomination
  - Syro-Malabar Catholic Church, an Eastern Catholic denomination
- Syriac Churches that employ West Syriac Rite
  - Syriac Orthodox Church, an Oriental Orthodox denomination
  - Syro-Malankara Orthodox Church, an Oriental Orthodox denomination
  - Syriac Catholic Church, an Eastern Catholic denomination
  - Syro-Maronite Catholic Church, an Eastern Catholic denomination
  - Syro-Malankara Catholic Church, an Eastern Catholic denomination

== See also ==
- Syriac Churches in India
- East Syriac Church (disambiguation)
- West Syriac Church (disambiguation)
- Syriac (disambiguation)
- Syrian (disambiguation)
