= West Syriac (disambiguation) =

West Syriac usually refers to the West Syriac Rite.

West Syriac or Western Syriac may also refer to:

- West Syriac Rite, liturgical rite of the Syriac Orthodox Church, and the Syriac Catholic Church.
- West Syriac alphabet, western form of the Syriac alphabet
- Western Syriac, the western dialect/pronunciation system of the Classical Syriac language.
- Surayt/Turoyo, sometimes colloquially referred to as "Western (Neo-)Syriac".

== See also ==
- East Syriac (disambiguation)
- Syriac (disambiguation)
- Syriac Christianity
- Syriac language
- Syriac Rite (disambiguation)
- West Syriac Church (disambiguation)
