= Suriyani Malayalam =

Dialect of Malayalam written in a variant of Syriac alphabet

- Karshoni
- ܣܘܼܪܝܼܝܵࡥܝܼ ܡܲܠܲܝܵࡨܲܡ സുറിയാനി മലയാളം Suriyāni malayāḷaṁ
- Malayalam Karshon written in Karshoni
- Native to: India
- Region: Southern India: Kerala
- Ethnicity: Malayali (Nasranis)
- Language family: Dravidian: Southern; Southern I; Tamil–Kannada; Tamil–Kota; Tamil–Toda; Tamil–Irula; Tamil–Kodava–Urali; Tamil–Malayalam; Malayalamoid; Malayalam; Suriyani Malayalam
- Early forms: Old Tamil: Middle Tamil; Old Malayalam; Middle Malayalam
- Writing system: Malayalam Karshon: Malayalam script (Brahmic)

Language codes
- ISO 639-3: –
- Glottolog: nasr1237
- Linguasphere: 49-EBE-bas

Ittimani Kathanar's transcription of the AD 849 Tharisappally Copper Plates into Karshon Malayalam in 1601 AD.

Suriyani Malayalam (Malayalam: സുറിയാനി മലയാളം, Karshoni: ܣܘܼܪܝܼܝܵࡥܝܼ ܡܲܠܲܝܵࡨܲܡ), also known as Karshoni, Syro-Malabarica or Syriac Malayalam, is a dialect of Malayalam written in a variant form of the Syriac alphabet which was popular among the Saint Thomas Christians (also known as Syrian Christians or Nasranis) of Kerala in India. It uses Malayalam grammar, the Maḏnḥāyā or "Eastern" Syriac script with special orthographic features, and vocabulary from Malayalam and East Syriac. This originated in the South Indian region of the Malabar Coast (modern-day Kerala). Until the 19th century, the script was widely used by Syrian Christians in Kerala.

== Literature ==
Vedatharkam written by Kariattil Mar Ousep is one of the famous books written in Suriyani Malayalam. Large number of documents written in Suriyani Malayalam are found among the Saint Thomas Christians or Nasranis of Kerala. These documents include an alternate set of the Canons of the Synod of Diamper. At present the dialect is not in popular usage. However it survives in historical literature of the Saint Thomas Christian denominations. Thomas Koonammakkal is one of the most notable experts in Garshuni Malayalam studies.

== Loanwords ==
Over the centuries, Malayalam borrowed Eastern Syriac words. A few of them are given below:

Original Syriac	Suriyani Malayalam	Meaning
Immā	Umma	Mother
Avā	Aavan or Bava	Father
Ar’ā	Aram	Earth, foundation
‘almāyā	Almayar, Almayan	Laity
Nāṣrāyā	Nasrani	Follower of Nazareth Christ
Kna'nāyā	Knānāya	Canaanite
Piṣḥā	Pesaha	Passover
Petturta	Pethurtha	First Sunday of Great Lent
Mala’ḵā	Malakha	Angel
Maḏbḥā	Madbaha	Altar
Metran	Metran	Metropolitan
Malpānā	Malpan	Teacher (ecclesiastical)
Quddāšā	Kudasha	Sacrament
Qaddīšā	Qandisha, Qandishan	The Holy one
Rabban	Ramban, Rambachan	Monk
Mšammšānā/Šammāšā	Shammashan, Shammachan	Deacon
Ma’mōḏīṯā	Mamodisa	Baptism
Sāhḏā	Sahada	Martyr
Ṣlīvā	Sliva, Siluva, Sleeba	Cross
Īšō'	Isho	Jesus
Qurbānā	Qurbana	Sacrifice/Peace Offering
Mšīḥā	Mishiha, Mashiha	Anointed, Christ
Duḵrānā	Dukrana	Remembrance
Qaššīšā	Kathanar/Kasnar	Syrian priest
Mār	Mar	Lord, Saint
Rūḥā	Ruha	Holy Spirit
Yaldā	Eldho, Yeldho	Nativity
Šlīḥā	Shliha	Apostle

== Writing system ==
Suriyāni Malayalam alphabet ܣܘܼܪܝܼܝܵࡥܝܼ ܡܲܠܲܝܵࡨܲܡ ܠܝ݂ܦܝ݂ suriyāni malayāḷaṁ lipi
- Suriyani Malayalam Alphabet Chart
- Script type: Abjad
- Direction: Right-to-left script
- Languages: Aramaic (Classical Syriac), Malayalam (Syro-Malabarica),

Related scripts
- Parent systems: Egyptian hieroglyphs: Proto-Sinaitic script; Phoenician alphabet; Aramaic alphabet; Syriac alphabet; Suriyāni Malayalam alphabet

Unicode
- Unicode range: U+0700–U+074F Syriac; U+0860–U+086F Syriac Supplement

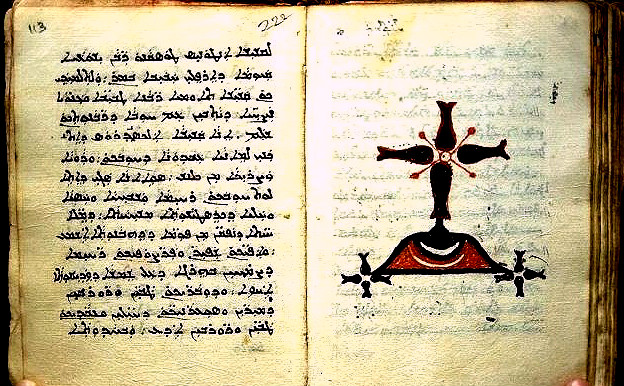
East Syriac Rite Thaksa (Liturgy of Addai and Mari) in Maḏnḥāyā Syriac (from the Chaldean Syrian Church, Thrissur, Kerala)

Signature of Syro-Malabar Venerable Varghese Payyappilly in Syriac script

There were numerous problems in writing Malayalam using the Syriac script, which was designed for a Semitic language. Only 22 letters were available from the East Syriac alphabet to render 53 or so phonemes of Malayalam. This problem were overcome by adopting letters from the Malayalam script. Basic Syriac ʾĀlap̄ Bēṯ based on form with corresponding Malayalam letters.

ܕ	ܓ	ܒ	ܐ
ദ്	ഗ്	ബ്, വ്	അ
ܚ	ܙ	ܘ	ܗ
ഹ്	സ്	വ്	ഹ്
ܠ	ܟ	ܝ	ܛ
ൽ	ക്, ക്ക്	യ്	ത്
ܥ	ܣ	ܢ	ܡ
അ	സ്	ൻ	മ്
ܪ	ܩ	ܨ	ܦ
ർ	ഖ്	സ്	പ്, വ്
		ܬ	ܫ
		ത്, സ്	ശ്

Augmented letters from Malayalam script

ട്	ഞ്	ജ്	ങ്
ര്	ഭ്	ഩ*	ൺ
	ഷ്	ഴ്	ൾ

* Malayalam alveolar nasal encoded as U+0D29 for scholarly purposes.

Vowels

ܘ݁	ܹ	ܸ	ܘ݂	ܝ݂	ܵ	ܲ
ഒ, ഓ	ഏ	എ	ഉ, ഊ	ഇ, ഈ	ആ	അ
ܟܘ݁	ܟܹ	ܟܸ	ܟܘ݂	ܟܝ݂	ܟܵ	ܟܲ
കൊ, കോ	കേ	കെ	കു, കൂ	കി, കീ	കാ	ക

== Unicode ==
The Syriac alphabet was added to the Unicode Standard in September, 1999 with the release of version 3.0. Additional letters for Suriyani Malayalam were added in June, 2017 with the release of version 10.0.

=== Blocks ===
The Unicode block for Syriac is U+0700–U+074F:

Syriac^{[1]}^{[2]} Official Unicode Consortium code chart (PDF)
	0	1	2	3	4	5	6	7	8	9	A	B	C	D	E	F
U+070x	܀	܁	܂	܃	܄	܅	܆	܇	܈	܉	܊	܋	܌	܍		SAM
U+071x	ܐ	ܑ	ܒ	ܓ	ܔ	ܕ	ܖ	ܗ	ܘ	ܙ	ܚ	ܛ	ܜ	ܝ	ܞ	ܟ
U+072x	ܠ	ܡ	ܢ	ܣ	ܤ	ܥ	ܦ	ܧ	ܨ	ܩ	ܪ	ܫ	ܬ	ܭ	ܮ	ܯ
U+073x	ܰ	ܱ	ܲ	ܳ	ܴ	ܵ	ܶ	ܷ	ܸ	ܹ	ܺ	ܻ	ܼ	ܽ	ܾ	ܿ
U+074x	݀	݁	݂	݃	݄	݅	݆	݇	݈	݉	݊			ݍ	ݎ	ݏ
Notes 1.As of Unicode version 18.0 2.Grey areas indicate non-assigned code points

The Syriac Abbreviation (a type of overline) can be represented with a special control character called the Syriac Abbreviation Mark (U+070F).

The Unicode block for Suriyani Malayalam specific letters is called the Syriac Supplement block and is U+0860–U+086F:

Syriac Supplement^{[1]}^{[2]} Official Unicode Consortium code chart (PDF)
	0	1	2	3	4	5	6	7	8	9	A	B	C	D	E	F
U+086x	ࡠ	ࡡ	ࡢ	ࡣ	ࡤ	ࡥ	ࡦ	ࡧ	ࡨ	ࡩ	ࡪ					
Notes 1.As of Unicode version 18.0 2.Grey areas indicate non-assigned code points

== Sample Text ==
The following text is Article 1 of the Universal Declaration of Human Rights.

=== English ===
All human beings are born free and equal in dignity and rights. They are endowed with reason and conscience and should act towards one another in a spirit of brotherhood.

=== Karshoni ===
ܐܘܿࡥ̱ܵܡ ܒ݂ܲܟܘܼܦ̱: ܡܲࡥܘܼࡪܝܲࡧܸܠ̱ܵܒ݂ܲࡧܘܼܡ ܬܘܼܠܝܵܒ݂ܲܟܵܫܲࡠ̱ܲࡨܘܿࡣܘܼܡ ܐܲࡥܬܲܣ̱ܘܿࡣܘܼܡ ܣܒ݂ܵܬܲࡥܬࡧܝܲܬ̱ܘܿࡣܘܼܡܟܘܼࡣܝܼ ࡡܲࡥܝܼܫ݁ܝܼࡣ̱ܘܼࡨ̱ܲܒ݂ܲࡧܵࡤ. ܐܲࡥܝܘܿࡥܝܲܡ ࡦࡧܵܬܪܲࡦܵܒ݂ܲܬ̱ܘܿࡣܸ ܦܸࡧܘܼܡܵܪܘܼܒ݂ܵࡥܵࡤ ܡܲࡥܘܼࡪܝܲࡥ ܒ݂ܝܼܒ݂ܹܟܲܒܘܼܕܕ̃ܝܼܝܘܼܡ ܡܲࡥܲܣܵܟࡪܝܼܝܘܼܡ ܣܝܼܕܕ̃ܲܡܵܝܝܼࡧܝܼܟ̱ܘܼࡥ̱ܲܬ܀

=== Malayalam ===
ഒന്നാം വകുപ്പ്: മനുഷ്യരെല്ലാവരും തുല്യാവകാശങ്ങളോടും അന്തസ്സോടും സ്വാതന്ത്ര്യത്തോടുംകൂടി ജനിച്ചിട്ടുള്ളവരാണ്‌. അന്യോന്യം ഭ്രാതൃഭാവത്തോടെ പെരുമാറുവാനാണ്‌ മനുഷ്യന് വിവേകബുദ്ധിയും മനസാക്ഷിയും സിദ്ധമായിരിക്കുന്നത്‌.

=== Romanisation (ISO 15919) ===
onnāṁ vakuppŭ: manuṣyarellāvaruṁ tulyāvakāśaṅṅaḷōṭuṁ antassōṭuṁ svātantryattōṭuṅkūṭi janicciṭṭuḷḷavarāṇ‌ŭ. anyōnyaṁ bhrātr̥bhāvattōṭe perumāṟuvānāṇ‌ŭ manuṣyanŭ vivēkabuddhiyuṁ manasākṣiyuṁ siddhamāyirikkunnat‌ŭ.

=== IPA ===
on̪n̪ɑ̃ː ʋəkuppɨ̆ manuʂjaɾellaːʋaɾum t̪uljaːʋakaːʃaŋŋaɭoːʈum an̪t̪assoːʈum sʋaːt̪an̪t̪rjat̪t̪oːʈuŋkuːʈi d͡ʒanit͡ʃt͡ʃiʈʈuɭɭaʋaɾaːɳɨ̆ ǁ anjoːnjam bʱraːt̪rɨ̆bʱaːʋat̪t̪oːʈe peɾumaːruʋaːnaːɳɨ̆ manuʂjanɨ̆ ʋiʋeːkabud̪d̪ʱijum manasaːkʂijum sid̪d̪ʱamaːjiɾikkun̪ːat̪ɨ̆ ǁ

== See also ==
- Judeo-Malayalam
- Arabi Malayalam
- Garshuni
