= East Syriac (disambiguation) =

East Syriac or Eastern Syriac may refer to:

- East Syriac Rite, liturgical rite of several Christian denominations
- East Syriac dialects, eastern dialects of the Syriac language
- East Syriac alphabet, eastern form of the Syriac alphabet

== See also ==
- West Syriac (disambiguation)
- Syriac (disambiguation)
- Syriac Rite (disambiguation)
- East Syriac Church (disambiguation)
- Syriac Christianity
- Syriac language
