= West Syriac Church (disambiguation) =

West Syriac Church or West Syriac church refers to a church that performs the West Syriac Rite.

West Syriac Church may also refer to:

- Syriac Orthodox Church, the Syriac Orthodox Patriarchate of Antioch
- Syriac Catholic Church, the Syriac Catholic Patriarchate of Antioch
- Syro-Maronite Catholic Church, the Maronite Catholic Patriarchate of Antioch
- Syro-Malankara Orthodox Church, uses Malankara variant of the West Syriac Rite
- Syro-Malabar Independent Church, uses variant of the West Syriac Rite
- Syro-Malankara Catholic Church, uses Malankara variant of the West Syriac Rite

== See also ==
- West Syriac (disambiguation)
- East Syriac Church (disambiguation)
- Syriac Rite (disambiguation)
- Syriac (disambiguation)
