= East Syriac Church (disambiguation) =

East Syriac Church or East Syriac church refers to any church that performs the East Syriac Rite.

East Syriac Church may also refer to:

- Syriac Church of the East, medieval East Syriac Church, with modern branches:
  - Assyrian Church of the East
  - Ancient Church of the East
- Syro-Chaldean Catholic Church, uses Chaldean variant of the East Syriac Rite
- Syro-Malabar Catholic Church, uses Malabar variant of the East Syriac Rite

== See also ==
- East Syriac (disambiguation)
- Syriac (disambiguation)
- Syriac Rite (disambiguation)
- West Syriac Church (disambiguation)
