= Suriyani =

Suriyani may refer to:

- Nasranis, an ethno-religious community of Malayali Christians native to the state of Kerala
- Suriyani Malayalam, the Malayalam dialect spoken by them

== See also ==
- Syriac (disambiguation)
