= Titlo =

Early Cyrillic and Glagolitic diacritic

◌҃o

Titlo
- U+0483 ◌҃ COMBINING CYRILLIC TITLO

Titlo is an extended diacritic symbol initially used in early Cyrillic and Glagolitic manuscripts, e.g., in Old Church Slavonic and Old East Slavic languages. The word is a borrowing from the Greek: τίτλος, lit. 'title', and is a cognate of the words tittle and tilde. The titlo still appears in inscriptions on modern icons and in service books printed in Church Slavonic. The titlo has several meanings depending on the context.

== Visual forms ==
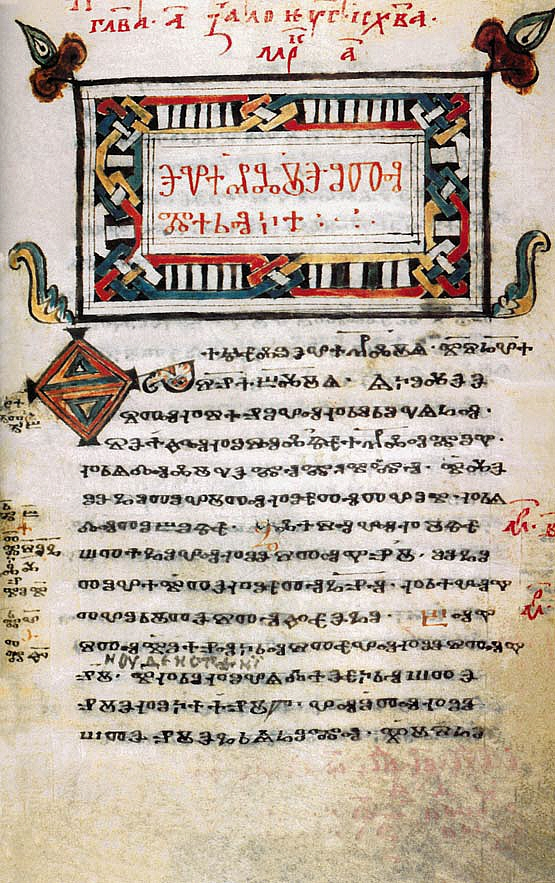
A page from the Codex Zographensis showing simple overline-shaped titlos.

"Lord" (gospod', господь)

Dobro with titlo, the Cyrillic numeral four

The titlo is drawn as a line over a text. A short titlo is placed over a single letter or over an entire abbreviation; a long titlo is placed over a whole word.

In some styles of writing the line is drawn with serifs, so that it may appear as a zigzag. The usual form in this case is short stroke up, falling slanted line, short stroke up.

An alternative resembles a musical volta bracket: short stroke up, horizontal line, short stroke down.

== Usages ==
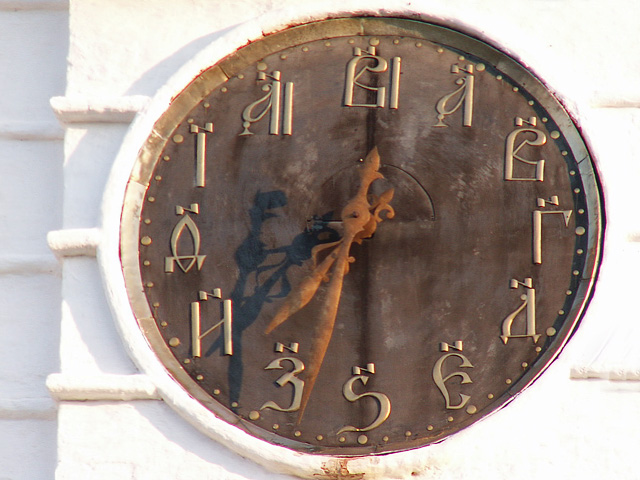
Cyrillic numerals with titlo, on the Suzdal Kremlin clock

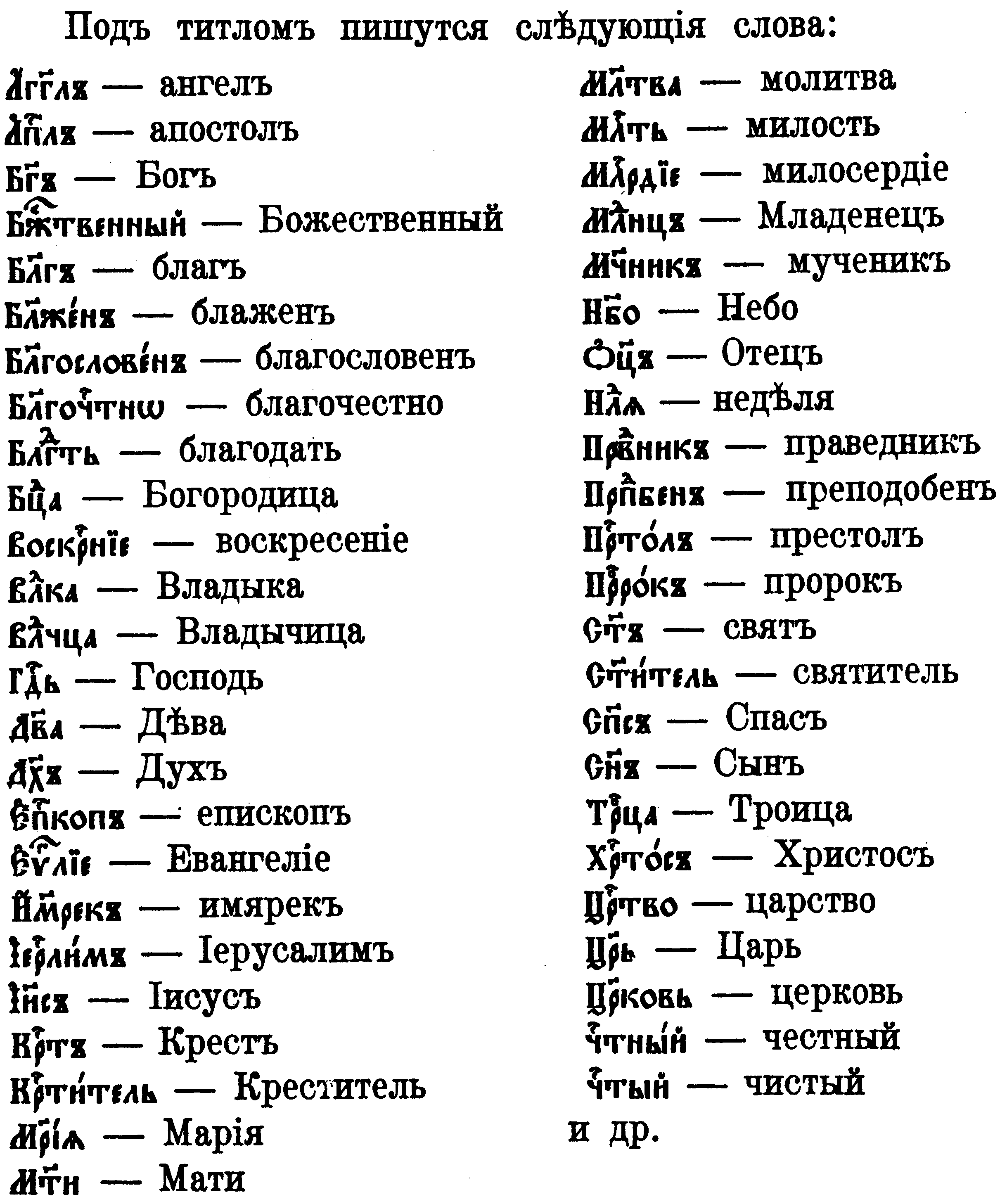
Frequently used sigla found in contemporary Church Slavonic

A titlo is used as a scribal abbreviation mark for frequently written long words and also for nouns describing sacred persons.

In place of Богъ, for example, Бг҃ъ 'God' was written under the titlo and глаголетъ '[he] speaks' is abbreviated as гл҃етъ. Fig. 2 shows Господь 'Lord' abbreviated to its first letter and stem ending (also a single letter here, in the nominative case).

Around the 15th century, titla in most schools came to be restricted to a special semiotic meaning, used exclusively to refer to sacred concepts, while the same words were otherwise spelled out without titla, and so, for example, while "God" in the sense of the one true God is abbreviated as above, "god" referring to "false" gods is spelled out; likewise, while the word for "angel" is generally abbreviated, "angels" is spelled out in "performed by evil angels" in Psalm 77. This corresponds to the Nomina sacra (Latin: "Sacred names") tradition of using contractions for certain frequently occurring names in Koine Greek and Hebraic Holy Scriptures.

The figure on the left shows a list of the most common of these abbreviations in current use in printed Church Slavonic.

A further meaning was in its use in manuscripts, where the titlo was often used to mark the place where a scribe accidentally skipped the letter, if there was no space to draw the missed letter above.

Titlos are also used to mark letters (usually in their old Cyrillic form) when they are used as Cyrillic numerals, a quasi-decimal system analogous to Greek numerals.

== Encoding ==
The zigzag-shaped titlo is encoded in Unicode as:

- U+0483 ◌҃ COMBINING CYRILLIC TITLO, to be used over a single base character, or
- U+FE2E ◌︮ COMBINING CYRILLIC TITLO LEFT HALF and U+FE2F ◌︯ COMBINING CYRILLIC TITLO RIGHT HALF, when it is split in parts over multiple base characters;
- if there's more than two base characters, the medial ones are combined with an overline (vinculum), which is also used for straight-line titlos.

== See also ==
- Overline
- Pokrytie
- Syriac Abbreviation Mark
