= Vinculum (symbol) =

Horizontal line used in mathematical notation

$\overline{\rm M}$

Roman numeral for 1,000,000
$\overline{\rm AB}$

line segment from A to B

1/7 = 0.1̅4̅2̅8̅5̅7̅

repeated 0.1428571428571428571...

$\overline{a + bi}$

complex conjugate

$Y = \overline{AB}$

boolean NOT (A AND B)

$\sqrt[n]{ab+2}$

radical ab + 2

$a-\overline{b+c}$ = a − (b + c)

bracketing function

Vinculum usage

A vinculum or constraint (from Latin vinculum 'fetter, chain, tie') is a horizontal line used in mathematical notation for various purposes. It may be placed as an overline or underline above or below a mathematical expression to group the expression's elements. Historically, vincula were extensively used to group items together, especially in written mathematics, but in modern mathematics its use for this purpose has almost entirely been replaced by the use of parentheses. It was also used to mark Roman numerals whose values are multiplied by 1,000. Today, the common usage of a vinculum to indicate the repetend of a repeating decimal is a significant exception and reflects the original usage.

== History ==
The vinculum, in its general use, was introduced by Frans van Schooten in 1646 as he edited the works of François Viète (who had himself not used this notation). However, earlier versions, such as using an underline as Chuquet did in 1484, or in limited form as Descartes did in 1637, using it only in relation to the radical sign, were common.

== Usage ==
=== Modern ===
A vinculum can indicate a line segment where A and B are the endpoints:

$$\overline{\rm AB}.$$

A vinculum can indicate the repetend of a repeating decimal value:

1/7 = 0.1̅4̅2̅8̅5̅7̅ = 0.1428571428571428571...

A vinculum can indicate the complex conjugate of a complex number:

$$\overline{2 + 3i} = 2 - 3i$$

Logarithm of a number less than 1 can be represented using vinculum:

$$\log 2 = 0.301 \Rightarrow \log 0.2 = \overline{1}.301 = -0.699$$

In Boolean algebra, a vinculum may be used to represent the operation of inversion (also known as the NOT function):

$$Y = \overline{AB},$$

meaning that Y is false only when both A and B are both true - or by extension, Y is true when either A or B is false.

Similarly, it is used to show the repeating terms in a periodic continued fraction. Quadratic irrational numbers are the only numbers that have these.

=== Historical ===
Formerly its main use was as a notation to indicate a group (a bracketing device serving the same function as parentheses):

$$a-\overline{b+c},$$

meaning to add b and c first and then subtract the result from a, which would be written more commonly today as a − (b + c). Parentheses, used for grouping, are only rarely found in the mathematical literature before the eighteenth century. The vinculum was used extensively, usually as an overline, but Chuquet in 1484 used the underline version.

=== As a part of a radical ===
The vinculum is used as part of the notation of a radical to indicate the radicand whose root is being indicated. In the following, the quantity $ab+2$ is the whole radicand, and thus has a vinculum over it:

$$\sqrt[n]{ab+2}.$$

In 1637 Descartes was the first to unite the German radical sign √ with the vinculum to create the radical symbol in common use today.

The symbol used to indicate a vinculum need not be a line segment (overline or underline); sometimes braces can be used (pointing either up or down).

== Encodings ==
=== Unicode ===
- U+0305 ◌̅ COMBINING OVERLINE

=== TeX ===
In LaTeX, a text <text> can be overlined with $\overline{\mbox{<text>}}$. The inner \mbox{} is necessary to override the math-mode (here invoked by the dollar signs) which the \overline{} demands. Naturally, this is not necessary in math environments, e.g. $1/3 = 0.\overline{3}$,

== See also ==
- Overline § Math and science similar-looking symbols
- Overline § Implementations in word processing and text editing software
- Underline
