= Syriac (Unicode block) =

- Range: U+0700..U+074F (80 code points)
- Plane: BMP
- Scripts: Syriac
- Major alphabets: Estrangela; Serto or West Syriac; Eastern Syriac; Garshuni (Arabic); Neo-Aramaic
- Assigned: 77 code points
- Unused: 3 reserved code points

Unicode Version History
- 3.0 (1999): 71 (+71)
- 4.0 (2003): 77 (+6)

Unicode documentation
- Code chart ∣ Web page

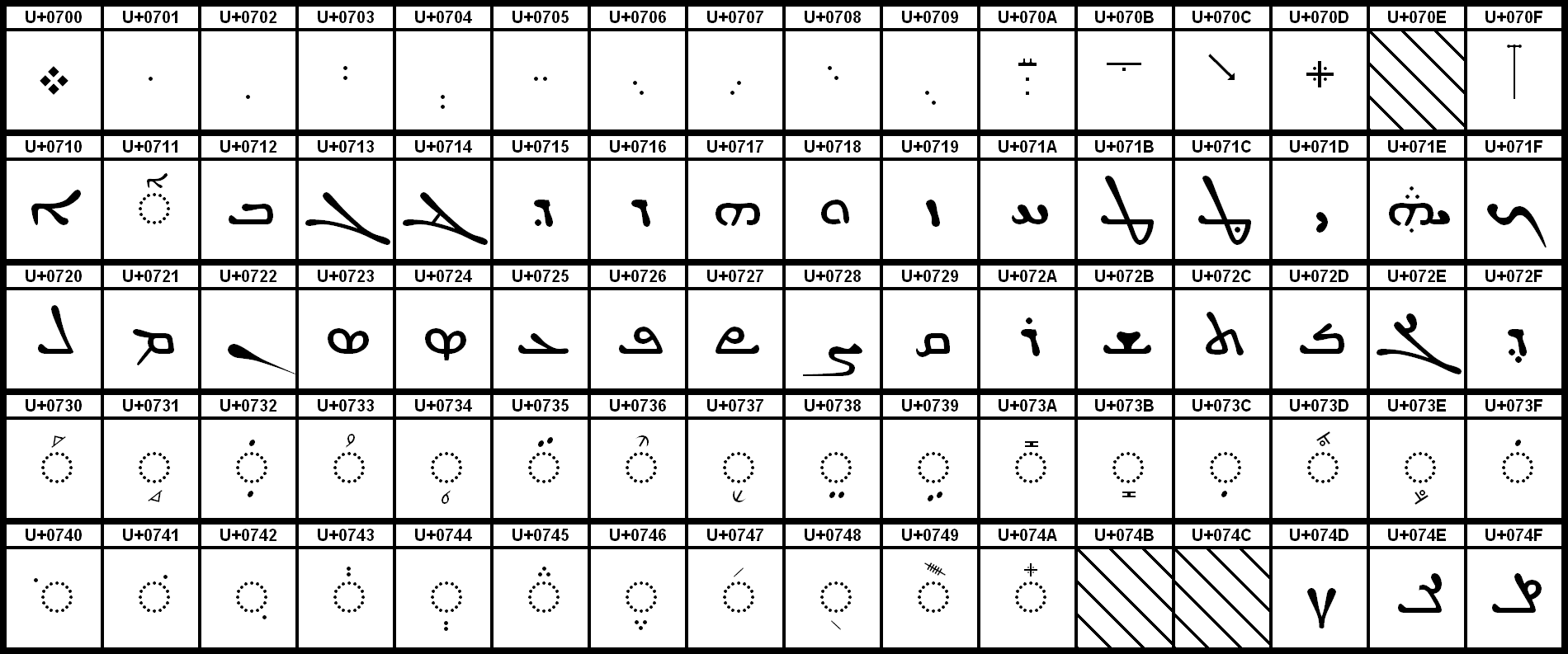
Graphical representation of the Syriac Unicode block. Hatched boxes indicate non-assigned code points.

Syriac is a Unicode block containing characters for all forms of the Syriac alphabet, including the Estrangela, Serto, Eastern Syriac, and the Christian Palestinian Aramaic variants. It is used in Literary Syriac, Neo-Aramaic, and Arabic among Syriac-speaking Christians. It was used historically to write Armenian, Persian, Ottoman Turkish, and Malayalam.

Additional Syriac letters used for writing the Malayalam language are encoded in the Syriac Supplement block.

== Unicode chart ==
Syriac^{[1]}^{[2]} Official Unicode Consortium code chart (PDF)
	0	1	2	3	4	5	6	7	8	9	A	B	C	D	E	F
U+070x	܀	܁	܂	܃	܄	܅	܆	܇	܈	܉	܊	܋	܌	܍		SAM
U+071x	ܐ	ܑ	ܒ	ܓ	ܔ	ܕ	ܖ	ܗ	ܘ	ܙ	ܚ	ܛ	ܜ	ܝ	ܞ	ܟ
U+072x	ܠ	ܡ	ܢ	ܣ	ܤ	ܥ	ܦ	ܧ	ܨ	ܩ	ܪ	ܫ	ܬ	ܭ	ܮ	ܯ
U+073x	ܰ	ܱ	ܲ	ܳ	ܴ	ܵ	ܶ	ܷ	ܸ	ܹ	ܺ	ܻ	ܼ	ܽ	ܾ	ܿ
U+074x	݀	݁	݂	݃	݄	݅	݆	݇	݈	݉	݊			ݍ	ݎ	ݏ
Notes 1.As of Unicode version 17.0 2.Grey areas indicate non-assigned code points

== History ==
The following Unicode-related documents record the purpose and process of defining specific characters in the Syriac block:

Version	Final code points (Note: Proposed code points and characters names may differ from final code points and names)	Count	L2 ID	WG2 ID	Document
3.0	U+0700..070D, 070F..072C, 0730..074A	71	L2/97-130		McGowan, R. (1997-02-24), The Unicode draft proposal for Syriac character encoding
3.0	U+0700..070D, 070F..072C, 0730..074A	71	L2/98-051		Nelson, Paul; Kiraz, George (1998-02-23), Supporting letters for Encoding Syriac
3.0	U+0700..070D, 070F..072C, 0730..074A	71	L2/98-052		Nelson, Paul; Kiraz, George (1998-02-23), Examples of Syriac
3.0	U+0700..070D, 070F..072C, 0730..074A	71	L2/98-070		Aliprand, Joan; Winkler, Arnold, "3.A.2. item a. Syriac script", Minutes of the joint UTC and L2 meeting from the meeting in Cupertino, February 25-27, 1998
3.0	U+0700..070D, 070F..072C, 0730..074A	71	L2/98-069		Nelson, Paul; Kiraz, George (1998-02-27), Presentation to support the coding of Syriac
3.0	U+0700..070D, 070F..072C, 0730..074A	71	L2/98-050	N1718	Nelson, Paul; Kiraz, George; Hasso, Sargon (1998-03-06), Proposal to Encode Syriac in ISO/IEC 10646
3.0	U+0700..070D, 070F..072C, 0730..074A	71	L2/98-156		Kiraz, George, Syriac: Unicode character properties
3.0	U+0700..070D, 070F..072C, 0730..074A	71	L2/98-158		Aliprand, Joan; Winkler, Arnold (1998-05-26), "Character Properties for Syriac Script", Draft Minutes – UTC #76 & NCITS Subgroup L2 #173 joint meeting, Tredyffrin, Pennsylvania, April 20-22, 1998
3.0	U+0700..070D, 070F..072C, 0730..074A	71	L2/98-286	N1703	Umamaheswaran, V. S.; Ksar, Mike (1998-07-02), "8.23", Unconfirmed Meeting Minutes, WG 2 Meeting #34, Redmond, WA, USA; 1998-03-16--20
3.0	U+0700..070D, 070F..072C, 0730..074A	71		N1837, N1837-Ireland	Summary of Voting/Table of Replies - Amendment 27 - Syriac, 1998-08-27
3.0	U+0700..070D, 070F..072C, 0730..074A	71	L2/98-322	N1907	ISO/IEC 10646-1/FPDAM. 27, AMENDMENT 27: Syriac, 1998-10-22
3.0	U+0700..070D, 070F..072C, 0730..074A	71		N1906	Paterson, Bruce; Everson, Michael (1998-10-22), Disposition of Comments - FPDAM27 - Syriac
3.0	U+0700..070D, 070F..072C, 0730..074A	71	L2/99-010	N1903 (pdf, html, doc)	Umamaheswaran, V. S. (1998-12-30), "6.7.10", Minutes of WG 2 meeting 35, London, U.K.; 1998-09-21--25
3.0	U+0700..070D, 070F..072C, 0730..074A	71	L2/01-118		Whistler, Ken; Cimarosti, Marco (2001-03-13), Joining group "WAW"
3.0	U+0700..070D, 070F..072C, 0730..074A	71	L2/10-439		Pournader, Roozbeh; Esfahbod, Behdad (2010-10-27), Refixing the bidi class for U+070F SYRIAC ABBREVIATION MARK
3.0	U+0700..070D, 070F..072C, 0730..074A	71	L2/11-286		Esfahbod, Behdad (2011-07-21), Syriac shaping fixes and clarifications
3.0	U+0700..070D, 070F..072C, 0730..074A	71	L2/12-050		Anderson, Deborah (2012-01-30), Glyph erratum for U+0709 SYRIAC SUBLINEAR COLON SKEWED RIGHT
3.0	U+0700..070D, 070F..072C, 0730..074A	71	L2/12-188	N4272	Anderson, Deborah (2012-05-08), Naming error for U+0709 SYRIAC SUBLINEAR COLON SKEWED RIGHT
3.0	U+0700..070D, 070F..072C, 0730..074A	71	L2/12-112		Moore, Lisa (2012-05-17), "Consensus 131-C20", UTC #131 / L2 #228 Minutes, "Approve a formal name alias for U+0709 SYRIAC SUBLINEAR COLON SKEWED RIGHT of "SYRIAC SUBLINEAR COLON SKEWED LEFT", for Unicode 6.2."
4.0	U+072D..072F, 074D..074F	6	L2/01-007		Bunz, Carl-Martin (2000-12-21), "Manichaean and Christian Sogdian Scripts", Iranianist Meeting Report: Symposium on Encoding Iranian Scripts in Unicode
4.0	U+072D..072F, 074D..074F	6	L2/02-009		Bunz, Carl-Martin (2001-11-23), "Christian Sogdian written in Syriac script(s)", 2nd Iranian Meeting Report
4.0	U+072D..072F, 074D..074F	6	L2/02-132	N2422	Everson, Michael (2002-03-30), Proposal to add six Syriac letters for Sogdian and Persian to the UCS
4.0	U+072D..072F, 074D..074F	6	L2/02-185		Nelson, Paul (2002-05-01), E-mail from Paul Nelson re Sogdian Issues
4.0	U+072D..072F, 074D..074F	6	L2/02-405	N2509	Everson, Michael; Sims-Williams, Nicholas (2002-11-04), Shaping behaviour of six Syriac letters for Sogdian and Persian

== Character list ==
Code	Result	Description
Punctuation
U+0700	܀	Syriac End of Paragraph
U+0701	܁	Syriac Supralinear Full Stop
U+0702	܂	Syriac Sublinear Full Stop
U+0703	܃	Syriac Supralinear Colon
U+0704	܄	Syriac Sublinear Colon
U+0705	܅	Syriac Horizontal Colon
U+0706	܆	Syriac Colon skewed left
U+0707	܇	Syriac Colon skewed right
U+0708	܈	Syriac Supralinear Colon skewed left
U+0709	܉	Syriac Sublinear Colon skewed right
U+070A	܊	Syriac Contraction
U+070B	܋	Syriac Harklean Obelus
U+070C	܌	Syriac Harklean Metobelus
U+070D	܍	Syriac Harklean Asteriscus
U+070F	܏	Syriac Abbreviation Mark
Letters
U+0710	ܐ	Syriac Letter Alaph
U+0711	ܑ	Syriac Letter Superscript Alaph
U+0712	ܒ	Syriac Letter Beth
U+0713	ܓ	Syriac Letter Gamal
U+0714	ܔ	Syriac Letter Gamal Garshuni
U+0715	ܕ	Syriac Letter Dalath
U+0716	ܖ	Syriac Letter Dotless Dalath Rish
U+0717	ܗ	Syriac Letter He
U+0718	ܘ	Syriac Letter Waw
U+0719	ܙ	Syriac Letter Zain
U+071A	ܚ	Syriac Letter Heth
U+071B	ܛ	Syriac Letter Teth
U+071C	ܜ	Syriac Letter Teth Garshuni
U+071D	ܝ	Syriac Letter Yudh
U+071E	ܞ	Syriac Letter Yudh He
U+071F	ܟ	Syriac Letter Kaph
U+0720	ܠ	Syriac Letter Lamadh
U+0721	ܡ	Syriac Letter Mim
U+0722	ܢ	Syriac Letter Nun
U+0723	ܣ	Syriac Letter Semkath
U+0724	ܤ	Syriac Letter Final Semkath
U+0725	ܥ	Syriac Letter E
U+0726	ܦ	Syriac Letter Pe
U+0727	ܧ	Syriac Letter Reversed Pe
U+0728	ܨ	Syriac Letter Sadhe
U+0729	ܩ	Syriac Letter Qaph
U+072A	ܪ	Syriac Letter Rish
U+072B	ܫ	Syriac Letter Shin
U+072C	ܬ	Syriac Letter Taw
U+072D	ܭ	Syriac Letter Persian Bheth
U+072E	ܮ	Syriac Letter Persian Ghamal
U+072F	ܯ	Syriac Letter Persian Dhalath
U+074D	ݍ	Syriac Letter Sogdian Zhain
U+074E	ݎ	Syriac Letter Sogdian Khaph
U+074F	ݏ	Syriac Letter Sogdian Fe
Diacritics
U+0730	ܰ	Syriac Pthaha Above
U+0731	ܱ	Syriac Pthaha Below
U+0732	ܲ	Syriac Pthaha Dotted
U+0733	ܳ	Syriac Zqapha Above
U+0734	ܴ	Syriac Zqapha Below
U+0735	ܵ	Syriac Zqapha Dotted
U+0736	ܶ	Syriac Rbasa Above
U+0737	ܷ	Syriac Rbasa Below
U+0738	ܸ	Syriac Dotted Zlama Horizontal
U+0739	ܹ	Syriac Dotted Zlama Angular
U+073A	ܺ	Syriac Hbasa Above
U+073B	ܻ	Syriac Hbasa Below
U+073C	ܼ	Syriac Hbasa-Esata Dotted
U+073D	ܽ	Syriac Esasa Above
U+073E	ܾ	Syriac Esasa Below
U+073F	ܿ	Syriac Rwaha
U+0740	݀	Syriac Feminine Dot
U+0741	݁	Syriac Qushshaya
U+0742	݂	Syriac Rukkakha
U+0743	݃	Syriac Two Vertical Dots Above
U+0744	݄	Syriac Two Vertical Dots Below
U+0745	݅	Syriac Three Dots Above
U+0746	݆	Syriac Three Dots Below
U+0747	݇	Syriac Oblique Line Above
U+0748	݈	Syriac Oblique Line Below
U+0749	݉	Syriac Music
U+074A	݊	Syriac Barrekh
