= Garshuni =

Non-Syriac writings using the Syriac alphabet

Garshuni or Karshuni (Syriac alphabet: ܓܪܫܘܢܝ, Arabic alphabet: كرشوني) are non-Syriac writings using the Syriac alphabet, most often being Arabic or Malayalam.

The word "Garshuni" was used by George Kiraz to coin the term "garshunography", denoting the writing of one language in the script of another.

== History ==
Garshuni is first attested only in the mid-12th century and, for literary purposes, beginning in the 14th century. A sample from the 6th century exists but is considered by scholars as an atypical case.

Garshuni originated in the seventh century, when Arabic was becoming the dominant spoken language in the Fertile Crescent, but the Arabic alphabet was not yet fully developed. There is evidence that writing Arabic in Garshuni influenced the style of modern Arabic script. After this initial period, Garshuni writing has continued to the present day among some Syriac Christian communities in the Arabic-speaking regions of the Levant and Mesopotamia, who commonly use the Sertā script.

Suryani Malayalam is a Malayalam dialect of the Malankara Nasrani community in India, which was historically written in Karshoni until the 19th century.

A folk etymology traces the origins of the word to the prophet Moses, being related to "Gershon" from Exodus 2:22, or to a certain Carsciun.

== Characteristics ==
The Syriac alphabet has three principal varieties:

- Estrangelā (the Classical Syriac script),
- Madnhāyā (the Eastern Syriac script, often called "Assyrian" or "Nestorian"),
- Sertā (the Western Syriac script, often called "Jacobite" or "Maronite").

The Syriac alphabet is extended by use of diacritics to write Arabic Garshuni.

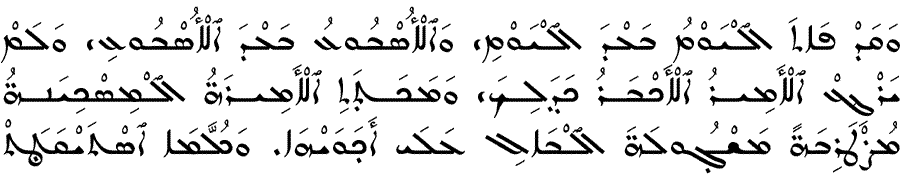
Garshuni script of the sertâ variety used for a story in Arabic: وَقَدْ فَاتَ ٱلْيَوْمُ بَعْدَ ٱلْيَوْمِ، وٱلْأُسْبُوعُ بَعْدَ ٱلْأُسْبُوعِ، وَلَمْ يَرْجِعْ ٱلْأَمِيرُ ٱلْأَكْبَرُ كَذَلِكَ، وَمَكَثَتِ ٱلْأَمِيرَةُ ٱلْمِسْكِيَنةُ مُضْطَرِبَةً مَشْغُولَةَ ٱلْبَالِ عَلَى أخَوَيْهَا. وَكُلَّمَا ٱسْتَيْقَظَتْ…

The correspondence of letters is not always one-to-one. For instance, the Syriac letter "g" (ܓ) can represent both "gh" (غ) and "j"‌ (ج).

== Similarities ==
Occasionally, other languages such as Turkish, Persian, Sogdian, the Kurdish languages and Malayalam have been written in the Syriac alphabet, and these are sometimes also referred to as "Garshunis". With several additional characters, the Malayalam version is better known as Karsoni and had been in use till early 20th century among the Keralite Syriac Christian clergymen and followers.

For the analogous Jewish practice of writing Arabic in Hebrew letters, see Judeo-Arabic languages.

Today, Assyrians use the word 'garshuni' when referring to a spoken language written using something other than its corresponding script, i.e. spoken Assyrian written using Latin script.

== See also ==
- Syriac language
- Arabic
- Karsoni
- The Syro-Aramaic Reading of the Koran
- Transliteration
- Judeo-Arabic – Jewish varieties of Arabic language
- Aljamiado – Writing with the Arabic or Hebrew script for European languages

== Bibliography ==
- Briquel-Chatonnet, F., “De l'intérêt de l'étude du garshouni et des manuscrits écrits selon ce système” in: L’Orient chrétien dans l’empire musulman: Hommage au professeur Gérard Troupeau (Studia arabica III). Versailles: Editions de Paris, 2005, pp. 463–475.
- Briquel-Chatonnet, F.; Desreumaux, A.; Binggeli, A., “Un cas très ancien de garshouni? Quelques réflexions sur le manuscrit BL Add. 14644” in: P. G. Borbone, A. Mengozzi, M. Tosco (éds.), Loquentes linguis. Studi linguistici e orientali in onore di Fabrizio A. Pennacchietti. Wiesbaden: Harrassowitz, 2006, pp. 141–147.
- Mengozzi, A., “The History of Garshuni as a Writing System: Evidence from the Rabbula Codex” in: F. M. Fales & G. F. Grassi (eds), CAMSEMUD 2007. Proceedings of the 13th Italian Meeting of Afro-Asiatic Linguistics, held in Udine, May 21–24, 2007, Padova: S.A.R.G.O.N. Editrice e Libreria, 2010, pp. 297–304.
- Mingana, A., “Garshūni or Karshūni?” in: Journal of the Royal Asiatic Society (1928) 891–893.
- Morozov, D.A., “Garshuni: Syriac script in Christian Arabic texts” (in Russian: “Karshuni: Sirijskaja pisjmennostj v arabo-hristianskih tekstah”) in: 5-je chtenija pamiati N. F. Kaptereva: Rossija i pravoslavnyj Vostok (Moscow, 30-31 Oct. 2007). Moscow, 2007, pp. 70–72.
- Ram, H., Qiṣṣat Mar Eliĭa (Die Legende vom Hl. Elias). Als Beitrag zur Kenntnis der arabischen Vulgar-Dialekte Mesopotamiens nach der Handschrift Kod. Sachau 15 der Konigl. Bibliothek zu Berlin herausgegeben, ubersetzt und mit einer Schriftlehre versehen. Inaugural-Dissertation. Leipzig, 1906.
- Seleznyov, Nikolai N., “Un clerc syro-occidental d’Arfad et le métropolitain de Jérusalem, de l’Église de l’Orient: Le livre “De l’unanimité de la foi” et sa recension en garshuni" (in Russian: “Zapadnosirijskij knizhnik iz Afrada i ijerusalimskij mitropolit Cerkvi Vostoka: “Kniga obschnosti very” i jejo rukopisnaja redakcija na karshuni") in: Symbol 58: Syriaca et Arabica. Paris-Moscow, 2010, pp. 34–87 (text in Garshuni: pp. 45–72).
