= Syriac Abbreviation Mark =

The Syriac Abbreviation Mark is a Unicode Control character (U+070F) that forms part of the Syriac script block. In Syriac, words are sometimes written in an abbreviated form, omitting some of the last letters. In such cases, a special overline is drawn over some of the final letters of the abbreviated word. Traditionally, this overline has a point at each edge and a point in the middle, but sometimes a plain overline was used. Another use of this overline is to mark numbers: in Syriac numbers are written using numerical values which are assigned to letters (similarly to the Gematria system in Hebrew). The sequence of letters used to write the number are also marked by the overline.

To implement this special overline in Unicode, a special control character was conceived: the Syriac Abbreviation Mark (or SAM), described in section 9.3 of the Unicode Standard. It is inserted in the stream of characters just before the first letter which should be marked with the overline (visually, to the right of it, since Syriac is a right-to-left script). OpenType also has stch “feature tag” to pave the way of proper rendering. The rendering engine should put an overline on all subsequent Syriac script letters, until the first character which is not a Syriac letter or diacritic. However, several computer environments do not render this character correctly, but show rather a substitution glyph where it appears in the character stream.

Here is an example containing the SAM, just after the Syriac letter Alaph (first letter to the right): : ܐ܏ܒܓܕ

The image below shows the correct way this should be rendered:

== See also ==
- Titlo
- Nomina sacra
