= Overline =

Horizontal line immediately above a portion of writing

Description	Sample	Unicode	CSS/HTML
Overline (markup)	X̅x̅	—N/a	text-decoration: overline;
Overline (character)	‾	U+203E	&oline;, &#8254;
Overline (character)	X̅x̅ (combining)	U+0305	X&#773;
Double overline (markup)	X̅x̅	—N/a	text-decoration: overline; text-decoration-style: double;
Double overline (character)	X̿x̿ (combining)	U+033F	X&#831;
Macron (character)	¯	U+00AF	&macr;, &#175;
Macron (character)	X̄x̄ (combining)	U+0304	X&#772;
Macron (character)	X̄x̄ (precomposed)	varies	

An overline, overscore, or overbar, is a typographical feature of a horizontal line drawn immediately above the text. In old mathematical notation, an overline was called a vinculum, a notation for grouping symbols which is expressed in modern notation by parentheses, though it persists for symbols under a radical sign. The original use in Ancient Greek was to indicate compositions of Greek letters as Greek numerals. In Latin, it indicates Roman numerals multiplied by a thousand and it forms medieval abbreviations (sigla). Marking one or more words with a continuous line above the characters is sometimes called overstriking, though overstriking generally refers to printing one character on top of an already-printed character.

An overline, that is, a single line above a chunk of text, should not be confused with the macron, a diacritical mark placed above (or sometimes below) individual letters. The macron is narrower than the character box.

== Uses ==
=== Medicine ===
In most forms of Latin scribal abbreviation, an overline or macron indicates omitted letters similar to use of apostrophes in English contractions. Letters with macrons or overlines continue to be used in medical abbreviations in various European languages, particularly for prescriptions. Common examples include

- **a̅**, **a̅**, or **ā** for ante ("before")
- **c̅**, **c̅**, or **c̄** for cum ("with")
- **p̅**, **p̅**, or **p̄** for post ("after")
- **q̅**, **q̅**, or **q̄** for quisque and its inflections ("every", "each")
- **s̅**, **s̅**, or **s̄** for sine ("without")
- **x̅**, **x̅**, or **x̄** for exceptus and its inflections ("except")

Note, however, that abbreviations involving the letter h take their macron halfway up the ascending line rather than at the normal height for Unicode overlines and macrons: ħ. This is separately encoded in Unicode with the symbols using bar diacritics and appears shorter than other overlines in many fonts.

=== Math and science ===
==== Decimal separator ====
In the Middle Ages, from the original Indian decimal writing, before printing, an overline over the units digit was used to separate the integral part of a number from its fractional part, as in 99̅95 (meaning 99.95 in decimal point format). A similar notation remains in common use as an underbar to superscript digits, especially for monetary values without a decimal separator, as in 99^{95}.

==== Vinculum ====
In mathematics, an overline can be used as a vinculum.

The vinculum can indicate a line segment:
$$\overline{\rm AB}$$
The vinculum can indicate a repeating decimal value:
$${1\over7} = 0.\overline{142857}=0.142857142857142857142857...$$
When it is not possible to format the number so that the overline is over the digit(s) that repeat, one overline character is placed to the left of the digit(s) that repeat:
$$3.\overline{\phantom{I}}3=3.\overline{3}=3.3333333333333333333333333...$$
$$3.12\overline{\phantom{I}}34 = 3.12\overline{34}=3.123434343434343434343434...$$
Historically, the vinculum was used to group together symbols so that they could be treated as a unit. Today, parentheses are more commonly used for this purpose.

==== Statistics ====
The overline is used to indicate a sample mean:

- $\overline x$ is the average value of $x_i$

Survival functions or complementary cumulative distribution functions are often denoted by placing an overline over the symbol for the cumulative: $\overline{F}(x) =1-F(x)$.

==== Negation ====
In set theory and some electrical engineering contexts, negation operators (also known as complement) can be written as an overline above the term or expression to be negated. For example:

Common set theory notation:

$$\begin{align}
\overline{A \cup B} &\equiv \overline{A} \cap \overline{B} \\
\overline{A \cap B} &\equiv \overline{A} \cup \overline{B}
\end{align}$$

Electrical engineering notation:

$$\begin{align}
\overline{A \cdot B} &\equiv \overline {A} + \overline {B} \\
\overline{A + B} &\equiv \overline {A} \cdot \overline {B}
\end{align}$$

in which the dot means logical AND, and the plus sign means logical OR.

Both illustrate De Morgan's laws and its mnemonic, "break the line, change the sign".

==== Negative ====
In common logarithms, a bar over the characteristic indicates that it is negative—whilst the mantissa remains positive. This notation avoids the need for separate tables to convert positive and negative logarithms back to their original numbers.

$$\log_{10}0.012\approx-2+0.07918=\bar{2}.07918$$

==== Complex numbers ====
The overline notation can indicate a complex conjugate and analogous operations.

- if $x = a + ib$, then $\overline{x} = a - ib.$

==== Vector ====
In physics, an overline sometimes indicates a vector, although boldface and arrows are also commonly used:

- $\overline x = |x|\hat x$

==== Congruence classes ====
Congruence modulo n is an equivalence relation, and the equivalence class of the integer a, denoted by a̅_{n}, is the set {... , a − 2n, a − n, a, a + n, a + 2n, ...}. This set, consisting of all the integers congruent to a modulo n, is called the congruence class, residue class, or simply residue of the integer a modulo n. When the modulus n is known from the context, that residue may also be denoted [a] or a̅.

==== Topological closure ====
In topology, the closure of a subset S of a topological space is often denoted S̅ or $\operatorname{cl} S$.

==== Improper rotation ====
In crystallography, an overline indicates an improper rotation or a negative number:

- $\overline 3$ is the Hermann–Mauguin notation for a threefold rotoinversion, used in crystallography.
- $[\overline 11\overline2]$ is the direction with Miller indices $h=-1$, $k=1$, $l=-2$.

==== Maximal conductance ====
In computational neuroscience, an overline is used to indicate the "maximal" conductances in Hodgkin-Huxley models. This goes back to at least the landmark paper published by Nobel prize winners Alan Lloyd Hodgkin and Andrew Fielding Huxley around 1952.

$$I_\mathrm{Na}(t)=\bar{g}_\mathrm{Na} m(V_m)^3h(V_m)(V_m-E_\mathrm{Na})$$

==== Antiparticles ====
Overlines are used in subatomic particle physics to denote antiparticles for some particles (with the alternate being distinguishing based on electric charge). For example, the proton is denoted as p, and its corresponding antiparticle is denoted as p̅.

=== Engineering ===
An active low signal is designated by an overline, e.g. R̅E̅S̅E̅T̅, representing logical negation.

=== Graphics Design ===
Overlining is also used in graphics design for decoration of text to help convey a message.

=== Morse (CW) ===
Some Morse code prosigns can be expressed as two or three characters run together, and an overline is often used to signify this. The most famous is the distress signal, S̅O̅S̅.

=== Writing ===
An overline-like symbol is traditionally used in Syriac text to mark abbreviations and numbers. It has dots at each end and the center. In German it is occasionally used to indicate a pair of letters which cannot both be fitted into the available space (also see the use of macron in German writing).

When Morse code is written out as text, overlines are used to distinguish prosigns and other concatenated character groups from strings of individual characters.

In Arabic writing and printing, overlines are traditionally used instead of underlines for typographic emphasis, although underlines are used more and more due to the rise of the internet.

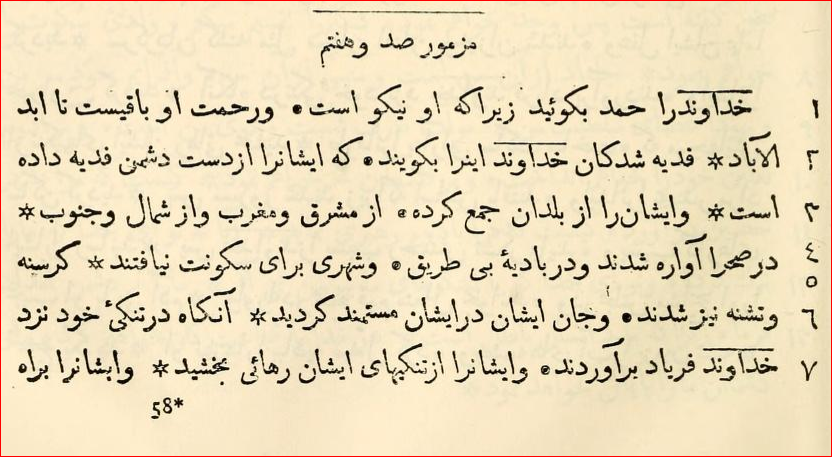
Overlines used in a version of the Bible in Persian (1920)

=== Linguistics ===
X-bar theory makes use of overbar notation to indicate differing levels of syntactic structure. Certain structures are represented by adding an overbar to the unit, as in X̅. Due to difficulty in typesetting the overbar, the prime symbol is often used instead, as in X′. Contemporary typesetting software, such as LaTeX, has made typesetting overbars considerably simpler; both prime and overbar markers are accepted usages. Some variants of X-bar notation use a double-bar (or double-prime) to represent phrasal-level units.

X-bar theory derives its name from the overbar. One of the core proposals of the theory was the creation of an intermediate syntactic node between phrasal (XP) and unit (X) levels; rather than introduce a different label, the intermediate unit was marked with a bar.

== Implementations ==
=== HTML with CSS ===
In HTML using CSS, overline is implemented via the text-decoration property; for example, <span style="text-decoration: overline">text</span> results in: t̅e̅x̅t̅.

The text decoration property supports also other typographical features with horizontal lines: underline (a line below the text) and strikethrough (a line ~~through~~ the text).

=== Unicode ===
Unicode includes two graphic characters, U+00AF ¯ MACRON and U+203E ‾ OVERLINE. They are compatibility equivalent to the U+0020 SPACE with non-spacing diacritics U+0304 ◌̄ COMBINING MACRON and U+0305 ◌̅ COMBINING OVERLINE respectively; the latter allows an overline to be placed over any character. There is also U+033F ◌̿ COMBINING DOUBLE OVERLINE. As with any combining character, it appears in the same character box as the character that logically precedes it: for example, x̅, compared to x‾. A series of overlined characters, for example 1̅2̅3̅, may result either in a broken or an unbroken line, depending on the font.

In Unicode, character U+FE26 COMBINING CONJOINING MACRON is conjoining (bridging) two characters: ◌︦◌.

In East Asian (CJK) computing, U+FFE3 ￣ FULLWIDTH MACRON is available. Despite the name, Unicode maps this character to both U+203E and U+00AF.

Unicode maps the overline-like character from ISO/IEC 8859-1 and code page 850 to the U+00AF ¯ MACRON symbol mentioned above. In a reversal of its official name (and compatibility decomposition), it is much wider than an actual macron diacritic over most letters, and actually wider than U+203E ‾ OVERLINE in most fonts. In ChromeOS and Linux, the symbol can be added using the keystrokes Ctrl+⇧ Shift+U to activate Unicode input, then type "00AF" as the code for the character. On a Mac, with the ABC Extended keyboard, use ⌥ Option+a. In Microsoft Windows, U+00AF can be entered with the keystrokes Alt+0175 (where numbers are entered from the numeric keypad).

The Unicode character U+070F SYRIAC ABBREVIATION MARK is used to mark Syriac abbreviations and numbers. However, several computer environments do not render this line correctly or at all.

The Unicode character U+0B55 ୕ ORIYA SIGN OVERLINE is used as a length mark in Odia script.

=== Word processors ===
Collabora Online, an office suite for the web has direct menu support for several styles of Overline in the "Format" menu, with options available under "Format > Character" enabling the default solid Overline to be replaced with double overline, dots, dashes, waves, double waves, and the color of the Overline can be set.

Collabora Office and LibreOffice have direct menu support for several styles of Overline in the "Format" menu. The user-interface option is available in their word processors on Linux, macOS and Windows, and also in Android (in tablet format), ChromeOS and iPadOS with Collabora Office. Options for Overline are available under the menu: "Format > Character", enabling the default solid Overline to be replaced with double overline, dots, dashes, waves, double waves, and the color of the Overline can be set.

Microsoft Word does not have a menu option to edit Overlining in Microsoft Word for any operating system, or in Word for the web. Overlining can be added using fields codes, EQ \O(). The field code {EQ \O(x,¯)} produces x̅ and the field code {EQ \O(xyz,¯¯¯)} produces x̅y̅z̅; However this does not work in Word on Android, ChromeOS, iPadOS, or Word for the web. In Word 2010 it is necessary to insert an MS Equation object.

Overstriking of longer sections of text, such as in 1̅2̅3̅, can also be produced in many text processors as text markup as a special form of understriking.

=== Spreadsheet, Presentation and Graphics office suite applications ===
Collabora Online, Collabora Office and LibreOffice have direct menu support for several styles of Overline in the "Format" menu within applications of their office suites, including spreadsheets, presentations and graphics applications. The user-interface option is available in the web based suite, and the locally installable applications for Linux, macOS and Windows, and with Collabora Office in Android (in tablet format), ChromeOS and iPadOS. Options for Overline are available under the menu: "Format > Character", enabling the default solid Overline to be replaced with double overline, dots, dashes, waves, double waves, and the color of the Overline can be set.

=== TeX ===
In LaTeX, a text <text> can be overlined with $\overline{\mbox{<text>}}$. The inner \mbox{} is necessary to override the math-mode (here invoked by the dollar signs) which the \overline{} demands.

== See also ==
- Ā
- Titlo, an overline used to indicate numerals or abbreviations in Cyrillic
- Underscore
