= Syriac Supplement =

- Range: U+0860..U+086F (16 code points)
- Plane: BMP
- Scripts: Syriac
- Assigned: 11 code points
- Unused: 5 reserved code points

Unicode version history
- 10.0 (2017): 11 (+11)

Unicode documentation
- Code chart ∣ Web page

Syriac Supplement is a Unicode block containing supplementary Syriac letters used for writing the Suriyani Malayalam dialect.

== Block ==
Syriac Supplement^{[1]}^{[2]} Official Unicode Consortium code chart (PDF)
	0	1	2	3	4	5	6	7	8	9	A	B	C	D	E	F
U+086x	ࡠ	ࡡ	ࡢ	ࡣ	ࡤ	ࡥ	ࡦ	ࡧ	ࡨ	ࡩ	ࡪ					
Notes: 1. As of Unicode version 16.0; 2. Grey areas indicate non-assigned code points

== History ==
The following Unicode-related documents record the purpose and process of defining specific characters in the Syriac Supplement block:

Version	Final code points (Note: Proposed code points and characters names may differ from final code points and names)	Count	L2 ID	Document
10.0	U+0860..086A	11	L2/15-088	Pandey, Anshuman (2015-04-21), Preliminary Proposal to Encode Syriac Letters for Garshuni Malayalam
10.0	U+0860..086A	11	L2/15-149	Anderson, Deborah; Whistler, Ken; McGowan, Rick; Pournader, Roozbeh; Pandey, Anshuman; Glass, Andrew (2015-05-03), "Letters for Garshuni Malayalam", Recommendations to UTC #143 May 2015 on Script Proposals
10.0	U+0860..086A	11	L2/15-107	Moore, Lisa (2015-05-12), "C.3.2", UTC #143 Minutes
10.0	U+0860..086A	11	L2/15-156	Pandey, Anshuman (2015-06-02), Proposal to Encode Syriac Letters for Garshuni Malayalam
10.0	U+0860..086A	11	L2/15-166	Perczel, István (2015-06-10), Feedback on the Alphabetization of the Syriac letters for Garshuni (Suryani) Malayalam
10.0	U+0860..086A	11	L2/15-204	Anderson, Deborah; et al. (2015-07-25), "8. Syriac", Recommendations to UTC #144 July 2015 on Script Proposals
