= Syriac alphabet =

Ancient writing system

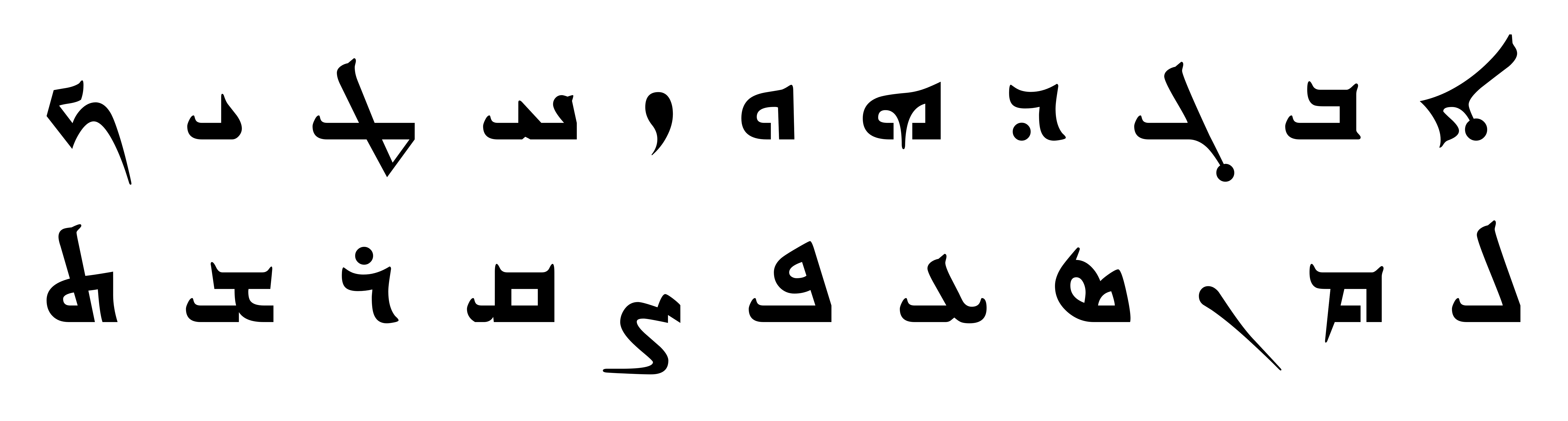
- Estrangela-styled alphabet
- Script type: Impure abjad
- Period: c. 1st century CE – present
- Direction: Right-to-left script
- Languages: Aramaic (Classical Syriac, Western Neo-Aramaic, Sureth, Turoyo, Christian Palestinian Aramaic), Arabic (Garshuni), Malayalam (Karshoni), Sogdian

Related scripts
- Parent systems: Egyptian: Proto-Sinaitic; Phoenician; Aramaic; Palmyrene; Syriac alphabet
- Child systems: Sogdian; Old Turkic; Old Hungarian; Old Uyghur; Mongolian

ISO 15924
- ISO 15924: Syrc (135), Syriac: Syre, 138 (ʾEsṭrangēlā variant); Syrj, 137 (Western variant); Syrn, 136 (Eastern variant)

Unicode
- Unicode alias: Syriac
- Unicode range: U+0700–U+074F Syriac; U+0860–U+086F Syriac Supplement

The Syriac alphabet (ܐܠܦ ܒܝܬ ܣܘܪܝܝܐ ʾālep̄ bêṯ Sūryāyā (Note: Also ܐܒܓܕ ܣܘܪܝܝܐ ʾabgad Sūryāyā.)) is a writing system primarily used to write the Syriac language since the 1st century. It is one of the Semitic abjads descending from the Aramaic alphabet through the Palmyrene alphabet, and shares similarities with the Phoenician, Hebrew, Arabic and Sogdian, the precursor and a direct ancestor of the traditional Mongolian scripts.

Syriac is written from right to left in horizontal lines. It is a cursive script where most—but not all—letters connect within a word. There is no letter case distinction between upper and lower case letters, though some letters change their form depending on their position within a word. Spaces separate individual words.

All 22 letters are consonants (called ܐܵܬܘܼܬܵܐ, ˀātūṯā). There are optional diacritic marks (called ܢܘܼܩܙܵܐ, nuqzā) to indicate vowels (ܙܵܘܥܵܐ, zāwˁā) and other features. In addition to the sounds of the language, the letters of the Syriac alphabet can be used to represent numbers in a system similar to Hebrew and Greek numerals.

Apart from Classical Syriac Aramaic, the alphabet has been used to write other dialects and languages. Several Christian Neo-Aramaic languages, from Turoyo to the Northeastern Neo-Aramaic language of Suret, once vernaculars, primarily began to be written in the 19th century. The Serṭā variant has explicitly been adapted to write Western Neo-Aramaic, previously written in the square Maalouli script, developed by George Rizkalla (Rezkallah), based on the Hebrew alphabet. Besides Aramaic, when Arabic began to be the dominant spoken language in the Fertile Crescent after the Islamic conquest, texts were often written in Arabic using the Syriac script as knowledge of the Arabic alphabet was not yet widespread; such writings are usually called Karshuni or Garshuni (ܓܪܫܘܢܝ). In addition to Semitic languages, Sogdian was also written with Syriac script, as well as Malayalam, which form was called Suriyani Malayalam.

== Alphabet forms ==
The opening words of the Gospel of John written in Serṭā, Maḏnḥāyā and ʾEsṭrangēlā (top to bottom) — brēšiṯ iṯaw[hy]-[h]wā melṯā, 'in the beginning was the word'.

There are three major variants of the Syriac alphabet: ʾEsṭrangēlā, Maḏnḥāyā and Serṭā.

=== Classical ʾEsṭrangēlā ===
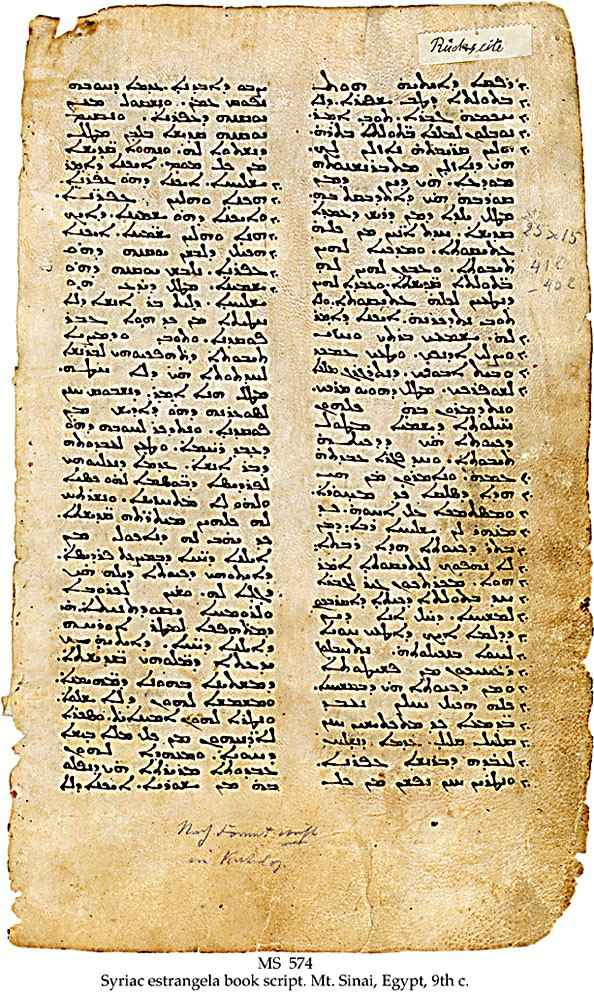
A 9th century ʾEsṭrangēlā manuscript of John Chrysostom's Homily on the Gospel of John.

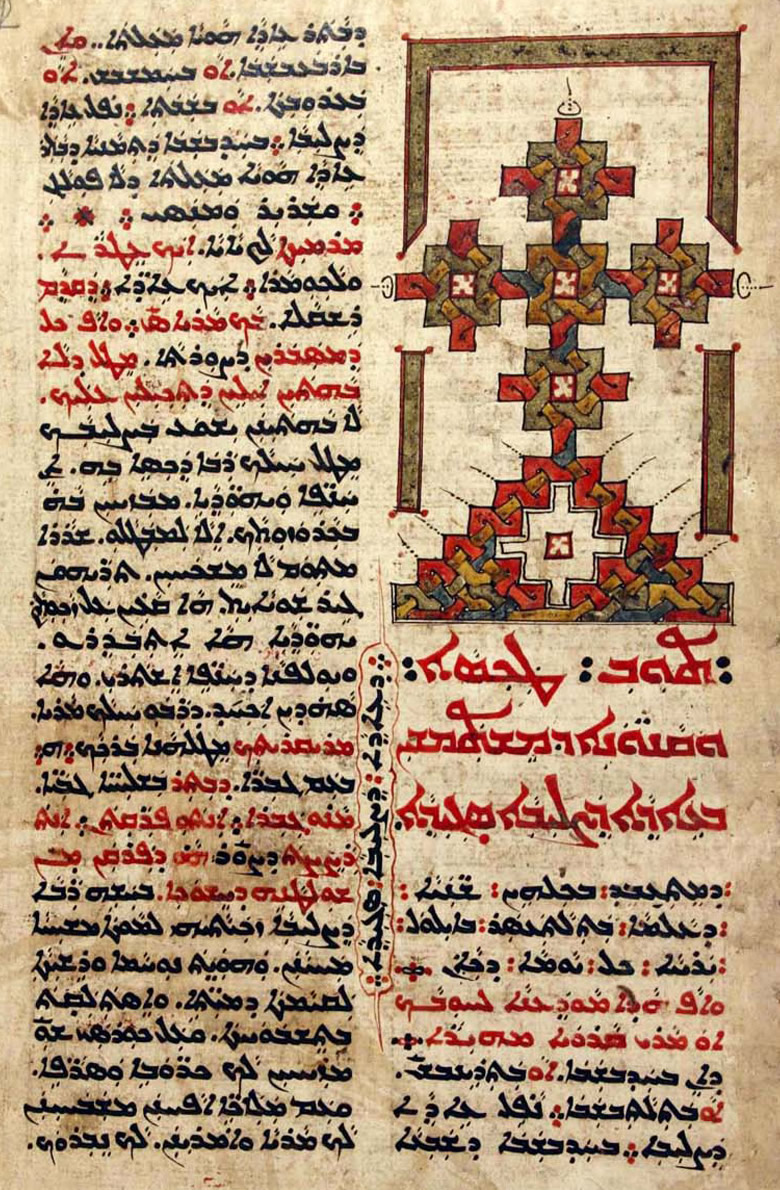
A 17th century Maḏnḥāyā liturgical manuscript from the Vatican Library. Note the title written in ʾEsṭrangēlā.

Yəšūʿ or ʾĪšōʿ, the Syriac name of Jesus in the ʾEsṭrangēlā script.

The oldest and classical form of the alphabet is ʾEsṭrangēlā (Note: Also pronounced/transliterated Estrangelo in Western Syriac.) (ܐܣܛܪܢܓܠܐ). The name of the script is thought to derive from the Greek adjective strongýlē (στρογγύλη, 'rounded'), though it has also been suggested to derive from serṭā ʾewwangēlāyā (ܣܪܛܐ ܐܘܢܓܠܝܐ, 'gospel character'). Although ʾEsṭrangēlā is no longer used as the main script for writing Syriac, it has received some revival since the 10th century. It is often used in scholarly publications (such as the Leiden University version of the Peshitta), in titles, and in inscriptions. In some older manuscripts and inscriptions, it is possible for any letter to join to the left, and older Aramaic letter forms (especially of ḥeṯ and the lunate mem) are found. Vowel marks are usually not used with ʾEsṭrangēlā, because it is the oldest form of the script and arose before specialized diacritics were developed.

=== East Syriac Maḏnḥāyā ===
The East Syriac dialect is usually written in the Maḏnḥāyā (ܡܲܕ݂ܢܚܵܝܵܐ, 'Eastern') form of the alphabet. Other names for the script include Swāḏāyā (ܣܘܵܕ݂ܵܝܵܐ, 'conversational' or 'vernacular', often translated as 'contemporary', reflecting its use in writing modern Neo-Aramaic), ʾĀṯōrāyā (ܐܵܬ݂ܘܿܪܵܝܵܐ, 'Assyrian', not to be confused with the traditional name for the Hebrew alphabet), Kaldāyā (ܟܲܠܕܵܝܵܐ, 'Chaldean'), and, inaccurately, "Nestorian" (a term that was originally used to refer to the Church of the East in the Sasanian Empire). The Eastern script resembles ʾEsṭrangēlā somewhat more closely than the Western script.

==== Vowels ====
The Eastern script uses a system of dots above and/or below letters, based on an older system, to indicate vowel sounds not found in the script:

- A dot above and a dot below a letter represent [a], transliterated as a or ă (called ܦܬ݂ܵܚܵܐ, pṯāḥā), (sometimes a dot above only)
- Two diagonally-placed dots above a letter represent [ɑ], transliterated as ā or â or å (called ܙܩܵܦ݂ܵܐ, zqāp̄ā),
- Two horizontally-placed dots below a letter represent [ɛ], transliterated as e or ĕ (called ܪܒ݂ܵܨܵܐ ܐܲܪܝܼܟ݂ܵܐ, rḇāṣā ʾărīḵā or ܙܠܵܡܵܐ ܦܫܝܼܩܵܐ, zlāmā pšīqā; often pronounced [ɪ] and transliterated as i in the East Syriac dialect),
- Two diagonally-placed dots below a letter represent [e], transliterated as ē (called ܪܒ݂ܵܨܵܐ ܟܲܪܝܵܐ, rḇāṣā karyā or ܙܠܵܡܵܐ ܩܲܫܝܵܐ, zlāmā qašyā),
- (ܘܼ) The letter waw with a dot below it represents [u], transliterated as ū or u (called ܥܨܵܨܵܐ ܐܲܠܝܼܨܵܐ, ʿṣāṣā ʾălīṣā or ܪܒ݂ܵܨܵܐ, rḇāṣā),
- (ܘܿ) The letter waw with a dot above it represents [o], transliterated as ō or o (called ܥܨܵܨܵܐ ܪܘܝܼܚܵܐ, ʿṣāṣā rwīḥā or ܪܘܵܚܵܐ, rwāḥā),
- (ܝܼ) The letter yōḏ with a dot beneath it represents [i], transliterated as ī or i (called ܚܒ݂ܵܨܵܐ, ḥḇāṣā),
- A combination of rḇāṣā karyā (usually) followed by a letter yōḏ represents [e] (possibly *[e̝] in Proto-Syriac), transliterated as ē or ê (called ܐܲܣܵܩܵܐ, ʾăsāqā).

It is thought that the Eastern method for representing vowels influenced the development of the niqqud markings used for writing Hebrew.

In addition to the above vowel marks, transliteration of Syriac sometimes includes ə, e̊ or superscript ^{e} (or often nothing at all) to represent an original Aramaic schwa that became lost later on at some point in the development of Syriac. Some transliteration schemes find its inclusion necessary for showing spirantization or for historical reasons. Whether because its distribution is mostly predictable (usually inside a syllable-initial two-consonant cluster) or because its pronunciation was lost, both the East and the West variants of the alphabet traditionally have no sign to represent the schwa.

=== West Syriac Serṭā ===
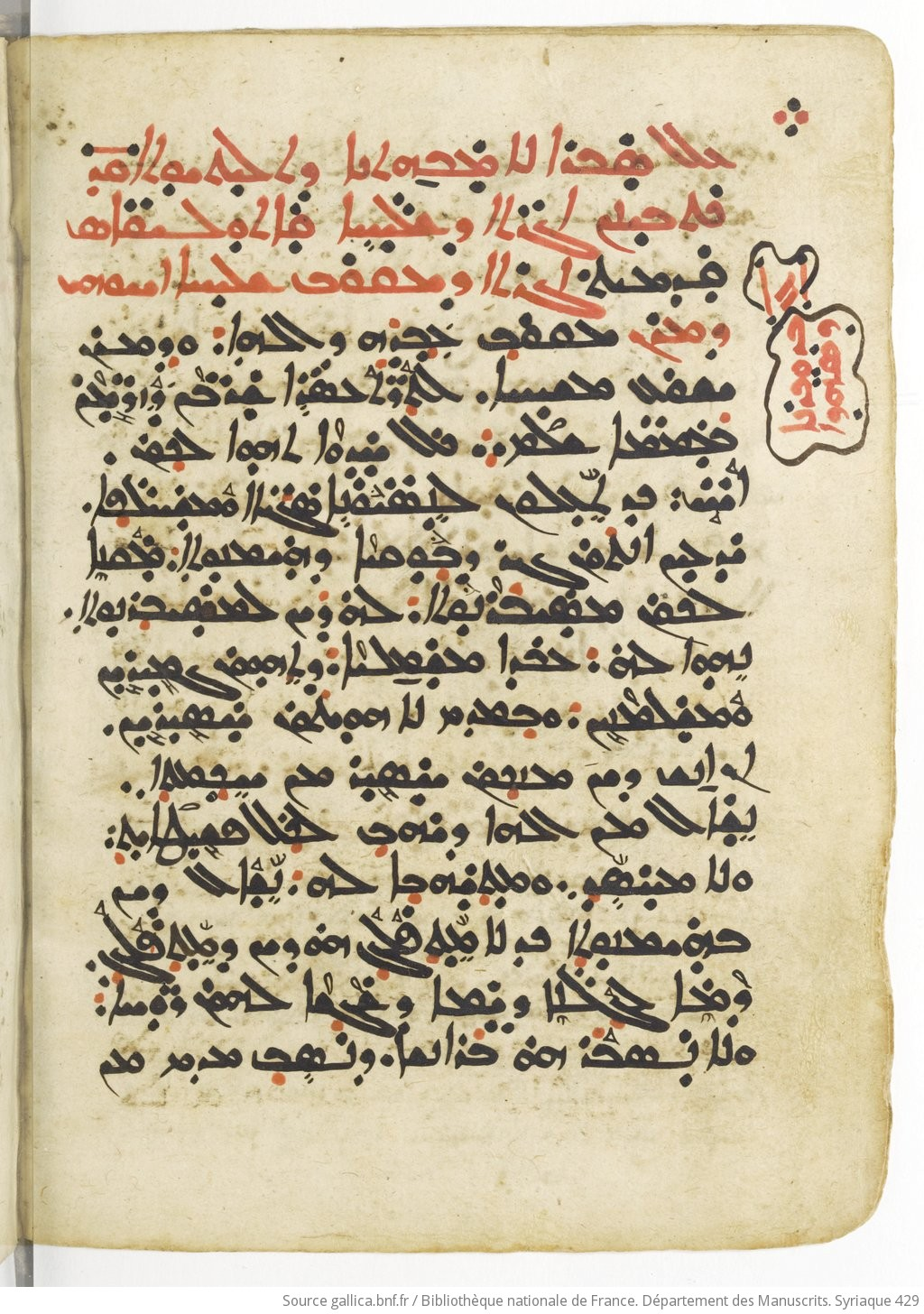
A 16th century Sertā manuscript of the New Testament Epistle of James.

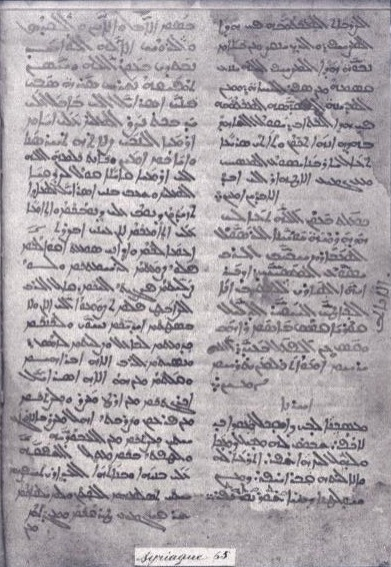
An example of Garshuni: a 16th-century Arabic-language manuscript written in the Syriac Serṭā script.

The West Syriac dialect is usually written in the Serṭā or Serṭo (ܣܶܪܛܳܐ, 'line') form of the alphabet, also known as the Pšīṭā (ܦܫܺܝܛܳܐ, 'simple'), 'Maronite'. Most of the letters are clearly derived from ʾEsṭrangēlā, but are simplified, flowing lines. A cursive chancery hand is evidenced in the earliest Syriac manuscripts, but important works were written in ʾEsṭrangēlā. From the 8th century, the simpler Serṭā style came into fashion, perhaps because of its more economical use of parchment.

==== Vowels ====
The Western script is usually vowel-pointed, with miniature Greek vowel letters above or below the letter which they follow:

- Capital alpha (Α) represents [a], transliterated as a or ă (ܦܬ݂ܳܚܳܐ, pṯāḥā),
- Lowercase alpha (α) represents [ɑ], transliterated as ā or â or å (ܙܩܳܦ݂ܳܐ, zqāp̄ā; pronounced as [o] and transliterated as o in the West Syriac dialect),
- Lowercase epsilon (ε) represents both [ɛ], transliterated as e or ĕ, and [e], transliterated as ē (ܪܒ݂ܳܨܳܐ, rḇāṣā),
- Capital eta (Η) represents [i], transliterated as ī (ܚܒ݂ܳܨܳܐ, ḥḇāṣā),
- A combined symbol of capital upsilon (Υ) and lowercase omicron (ο) represents [u], transliterated as ū or u (ܥܨܳܨܳܐ, ʿṣāṣā),
- Lowercase omega (ω), used only in the vocative interjection ʾō (ܐܘّ, 'O!').

== Summary table ==
The Syriac alphabet consists of the following letters, shown in their isolated (non-connected) forms. When isolated, the letters kāp̄, mīm, and nūn are usually shown with their initial form connected to their final form (see below). The letters ʾālep̄, dālaṯ, hē, waw, zayn, ṣāḏē, rēš and taw (and, in early ʾEsṭrangēlā manuscripts, the letter semkaṯ) do not connect to a following letter within a word; these are marked with an asterisk (*).

| Letter | | | | | | | | Sound Value (Classical Syriac) | | Numerical Value | Phoenician Equivalent | Imperial Aramaic Equivalent | Hebrew Equivalent | Arabic Equivalent |
| Name | Translit. | ʾEsṭrangēlā (classical) | Maḏnḥāyā (eastern) | Serṭā (western) | Latin (1930) | Cyrillic (pre-1929, 1938) | Unicode (typing) | Transliteration | IPA | Numerical Value | Phoenician Equivalent | Imperial Aramaic Equivalent | Hebrew Equivalent | Arabic Equivalent |
|---|---|---|---|---|---|---|---|---|---|---|---|---|---|---|
| *ܐܠܦ | ʾĀlep̄* (Note: Also pronounced ʾĀlap̄ or ʾOlaf (ܐܳܠܰܦ) in Western Syriac.) | | | | a, ə | ə, a | ܐ | ʾ or null mater lectionis: ā | [ʔ] or ∅ mater lectionis: [ɑ] | 1 | 𐤀 | 𐡀 | א | ا |
| ܒܝܬ | Bēṯ | | | | b, v | б, в | ܒ | hard: b soft: ḇ (also bh, v or ꞵ) | hard: [b] soft: [v] or [w] | 2 | 𐤁 | 𐡁 | ב | ب |
| ܓܡܠ | Gāmal | | | | g, x/h, ç | г, h, dж | ܓ | hard: g soft: ḡ (also g̱, gh, ġ or γ) | hard: [ɡ] soft: [ɣ] | 3 | 𐤂 | 𐡂 | ג | ج |
| *ܕܠܬ | Dālaṯ* | | | | d | d | ܕ | hard: d soft: ḏ (also dh, ð or ẟ) | hard: [d] soft: [ð] | 4 | 𐤃 | 𐡃 | ד | د / ذ |
| *ܗܐ | Hē* | | | | h | h | ܗ | h mater lectionis: ē (or e) | [h] mater lectionis: [e] | 5 | 𐤄 | 𐡄 | ה | ه |
| *ܘܘ | Waw* | | | | v, o, u | в, o, у | ܘ | consonant: w mater lectionis: ū or ō (also u or o) | consonant: [w] mater lectionis: [u] or [o] | 6 | 𐤅 | 𐡅 | ו | و |
| *ܙܝܢ | Zayn* | | | | z | з | ܙ | z | [z] | 7 | 𐤆 | 𐡆 | ז | ز |
| ܚܝܬ | Ḥēṯ | | | | x | x | ܚ | ḥ (also H, kh, x or ħ) | [ħ], [x] or [χ] | 8 | 𐤇 | 𐡇 | ח | ح / خ |
| ܛܝܬ | Ṭēṯ | | | | ţ | t | ܛ | ṭ (also T or ţ) | [tˤ] | 9 | 𐤈 | 𐡈 | ט | ظ / ط |
| ܝܘܕ | Yōḏ | | | | j, ij/ьj | j, иj/ыj | ܝ | consonant: y mater lectionis: ī (also i) | consonant: [j] mater lectionis: [i] or [ɪ] | 10 | 𐤉 | 𐡉 | י | ي |
| ܟܦ | Kāp̄ | | | | k, x, c | q, x, ч | ܟ | hard: k soft: ḵ (also kh or x) | hard: [k] soft: [x] | 20 | 𐤊 | 𐡊 | כ ך | ك |
| ܠܡܕ | Lāmaḏ | | | | l | l | ܠ | l | [l] | 30 | 𐤋 | 𐡋 | ל | ل |
| ܡܝܡ | Mīm | | | | m | м | ܡ | m | [m] | 40 | 𐤌 | 𐡌 | מ ם | م |
| ܢܘܢ | Nūn | | | | n | н | ܢܢ | n | [n] | 50 | 𐤍 | 𐡍 | נ ן | ن |
| ܣܡܟܬ | Semkaṯ | | | | s | c | ܣ | s | [s] | 60 | 𐤎 | 𐡎 | ס | س |
| ܥܐ | ʿĒ | | | | a | ə | ܥ | ʿ | [ʕ] (Note: Among most Assyrian Neo-Aramaic speakers, the pharyngeal sound of ʿĒ (/ʕ/) is not pronounced as such; rather, it typically merges into the plain sound of ʾĀlep̄ ([ʔ] or ∅) or geminates a previous consonant.) | 70 | 𐤏 | 𐡏 | ע | ع / غ |
| ܦܐ | Pē | | | | p, f | п, ф | ܦ | hard: p soft: p̄ (also p̱, ᵽ, ph or f) | hard: [p] soft: [f] or [w] | 80 | 𐤐 | 𐡐 | פ ף | ف |
| *ܨܕܐ | Ṣāḏē* | | | | s | c | ܨ | ṣ (also S or ş) | [sˤ] | 90 | 𐤑 | 𐡑 | צ ץ | ض / ص |
| ܩܘܦ | Qōp̄ | | | | q | к | ܩ | q (also ḳ) | [q] | 100 | 𐤒 | 𐡒 | ק | ق |
| *ܪܝܫ | Rēš* | | | | r | p | ܪ | r | [r] | 200 | 𐤓 | 𐡓 | ר | ر |
| ܫܝܢ | Šīn | | | | ş, ƶ | ш, ж | ܫ | š (also sh) | [ʃ] | 300 | 𐤔 | 𐡔 | ש | ش |
| *ܬܘ | Taw* | | | | t | т | ܬ | hard: t soft: ṯ (also th or θ) | hard: [t] soft: [θ] | 400 | 𐤕 | 𐡕 | ת | ت / ث |

== Contextual forms of letters ==
| Letter name | ʾEsṭrangēlā (classical) | | | Maḏnḥāyā (eastern) | | |
| Letter name | Unconnected final | Connected final | Initial or unconnected medial | Unconnected final | Connected final | Initial or unconnected medial |
|---|---|---|---|---|---|---|
| ʾĀlep̄ | | | | | (Note: In the final position following Dālaṯ or Rēš, ʾĀlep̄ takes the normal form rather than the final form in the Maḏnḥāyā variant of the alphabet.) | |
| Bēṯ | | | | | | |
| Gāmal | | | | | | |
| Dālaṯ | | | | | | |
| Hē | | | | | | |
| Waw | | | | | | |
| Zayn | | | | | | |
| Ḥēṯ | | | | | | |
| Ṭēṯ | | | | | | |
| Yōḏ | | | | | | |
| Kāp̄ | | | | | | |
| Lāmaḏ | | | | | | |
| Mīm | | | | | | |
| Nūn | | | | | | |
| Semkaṯ | | | | | / | |
| ʿĒ | | | | | | |
| Pē | | | | | | |
| Ṣāḏē | | | | | | |
| Qōp̄ | | | | | | |
| Rēš | | | | | | |
| Šīn | | | | | | |
| Taw | | | | | | |

=== Ligatures ===
| Letter name | ʾEsṭrangēlā (classical) | | | Maḏnḥāyā (eastern) | | | Unicode character(s) | Description |
| Letter name | Unconnected final | Connected final | Initial or unconnected medial | Unconnected final | Connected final | Initial or unconnected medial | Unicode character(s) | Description |
|---|---|---|---|---|---|---|---|---|
| Lāmaḏ-ʾĀlep̄ | | | | | | | ܠܐ | Lāmaḏ and ʾĀlep̄ combined at the end of a word |
| Taw-ʾĀlep̄ | | | | / | | | ܬܐ | Taw and ʾĀlep̄ combined at the end of a word |
| Hē-Yōḏ | | | | | | | ܗܝ | Hē and Yōḏ combined at the end of a word |
| Taw-Yōḏ | | | | | | | ܬܝ | Taw and Yōḏ combined at the end of a word |

== Letter alterations ==
=== Matres lectionis ===
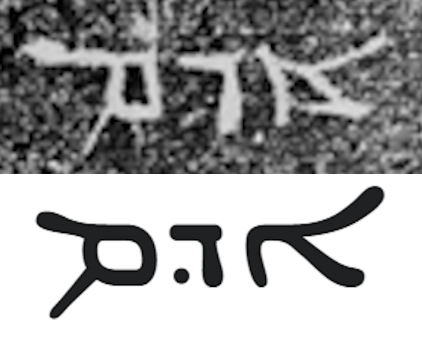
The name of the monk "Adam" in Syriac in the 781 CE Xi'an Nestorian Stele, China.

Three letters act as matres lectionis: rather than being a consonant, they indicate a vowel. ʾālep̄ (ܐ), the first letter, represents a glottal stop, but it can also indicate a vowel, especially at the beginning or the end of a word. The letter waw (ܘ) is the consonant w, but can also represent the vowels o and u. Likewise, the letter yōḏ (ܝ) represents the consonant y, but it also stands for the vowels i and e.

=== Majlīyānā ===
In modern usage, some alterations can be made to represent phonemes not represented in classical phonology. A mark similar in appearance to a tilde (~), called majlīyānā (ܡܲܓ̰ܠܝܼܵܢܵܐ), is placed above or below a letter in the Maḏnḥāyā variant of the alphabet to change its phonetic value (see also: Geresh):

- Added below gāmal: [ɡ] to [d͡ʒ] (voiced palato-alveolar affricate)
- Added below kāp̄: [k] to [t͡ʃ] (voiceless palato-alveolar affricate)
- Added above or below zayn: [z] to [ʒ] (voiced palato-alveolar sibilant)
- Added above šīn: [ʃ] to [ʒ]

=== Rūkkāḵā and qūššāyā ===
In addition to foreign sounds, a marking system is used to distinguish qūššāyā (ܩܘܫܝܐ, 'hard' letters) from rūkkāḵā (ܪܘܟܟܐ, 'soft' letters). The letters bēṯ, gāmal, dālaṯ, kāp̄, pē, and taw, all stop consonants ('hard') are able to be 'spirantized' (lenited) into fricative consonants ('soft'). The system involves placing a single dot underneath the letter to give its 'soft' variant and a dot above the letter to give its 'hard' variant (though, in modern usage, no mark at all is usually used to indicate the 'hard' value):

| Name | Stop | Translit. | IPA | Name | Fricative | Translit. | IPA | Notes |
|---|---|---|---|---|---|---|---|---|
| Bēṯ (qšīṯā) | ܒ݁ | b | [b] | Bēṯ rakkīḵtā | ܒ݂ | ḇ | [v] or [w] | [v] has become [w] in most modern dialects. |
| Gāmal (qšīṯā) | ܓ݁ | g | [ɡ] | Gāmal rakkīḵtā | ܓ݂ | ḡ | [ɣ] | Usually becomes [j], [ʔ], or is not pronounced in modern Eastern dialects. |
| Dālaṯ (qšīṯā) | ܕ݁ | d | [d] | Dālaṯ rakkīḵtā | ܕ݂ | ḏ | [ð] | [d] is left unspirantized in some modern Eastern dialects. |
| Kāp̄ (qšīṯā) | ܟ݁ | k | [k] | Kāp̄ rakkīḵtā | ܟ݂ | ḵ | [x] | |
| Pē (qšīṯā) | ܦ݁ | p | [p] | Pē rakkīḵtā | ܦ݂ or ܦ̮ | p̄ | [f] or [w] | [f] is not found in most modern Eastern dialects. Instead, it either is left unspirantized or sometimes appears as [w]. Pē is the only letter in the Eastern variant of the alphabet that is spirantized by the addition of a semicircle instead of a single dot. |
| Taw (qšīṯā) | ܬ݁ | t | [t] | Taw rakkīḵtā | ܬ݂ | ṯ | [θ] | [t] is left unspirantized in some modern Eastern dialects. |

The mnemonic bḡaḏkp̄āṯ (ܒܓܕܟܦܬ) is often used to remember the six letters that are able to be spirantized (see also: Begadkepat).

In the East Syriac variant of the alphabet, spirantization marks are usually omitted when they interfere with vowel marks. The degree to which letters can be spirantized varies from dialect to dialect as some dialects have lost the ability for certain letters to be spirantized. For native words, spirantization depends on the letter's position within a word or syllable, location relative to other consonants and vowels, gemination, etymology, and other factors. Foreign words do not always follow the rules for spirantization.

=== Syāmē ===
Syriac uses two (usually) horizontal dots (Note: In some Serṭā usages, the syāmē dots are placed diagonally when they appear above the letter Lāmaḏ.) above a letter within a word, similar in appearance to diaeresis, called syāmē (ܣܝ̈ܡܐ, literally 'placings', also known in some grammars by the Hebrew name ribbuy [רִבּוּי], 'plural'), to indicate that the word is plural. These dots, having no sound value in themselves, arose before both eastern and western vowel systems as it became necessary to mark plural forms of words, which are indistinguishable from their singular counterparts in regularly-inflected nouns. For instance, the word malkā (ܡܠܟܐ, 'king') is consonantally identical to its plural malkē (ܡܠܟ̈ܐ, 'kings'); the syāmē above the word malkē (ܡܠܟ̈ܐ) clarifies its grammatical number and pronunciation. Irregular plurals also receive syāmē even though their forms are clearly plural: e.g. baytā (ܒܝܬܐ, 'house') and its irregular plural bāttē (ܒ̈ܬܐ, 'houses'). Because of redundancy, some modern usage forgoes syāmē points when vowel markings are present.

There are no firm rules for which letter receives syāmē; the writer has full discretion to place them over any letter. Typically, if a word has at least one rēš, then syāmē are placed over the rēš that is nearest the end of a word (and also replace the single dot above it: ܪ̈). Other letters that often receive syāmē are low-rising letters—such as yōḏ and nūn—or letters that appear near the middle or end of a word.

Besides plural nouns, syāmē are also placed on:

- plural adjectives, including participles (except masculine plural adjectives/participles in the absolute state);
- the cardinal numbers 'two' and the feminine forms of 11–19, though inconsistently;
- and certain feminine plural verbs: the 3rd person feminine plural perfect and the 2nd and 3rd person feminine plural imperfect.

=== Mṭalqānā ===
Syriac uses a diacritic line, called mṭalqānā (ܡܛܠܩܢܐ, literally 'concealer', also known by the Latin term linea occultans in some grammars), to indicate a silent letter that can occur at the beginning or middle of a word. In Eastern Syriac, this line is diagonal and only occurs above the silent letter (e.g. ܡܕ݂ܝܼܢ݇ܬܵܐ, 'city', pronounced mḏīttā, not *mḏīntā, with the mṭalqānā over the nūn, assimilating with the taw). The line can only occur above a letter ʾālep̄, hē, waw, yōḏ, lāmaḏ, mīm, nūn, ʿē or rēš (which comprise the mnemonic ܥܡ̈ܠܝ ܢܘܗܪܐ ʿamlay nūhrā, 'the works of light'). In Western Syriac, this line is horizontal and can be placed above or below the letter (e.g. ܡܕ݂ܺܝܢ̄ܬܳܐ, 'city', pronounced mḏīto, not *mḏīnto).

Classically, mṭalqānā was not used for silent letters that occurred at the end of a word (e.g. ܡܪܝ mār[ī], '[my] lord'). In modern Turoyo, however, this is not always the case (e.g. ܡܳܪܝ̱ mor[ī], '[my] lord').

== Latin alphabet and romanization ==
In the late 1920s to late 1930s, both Cyrillic and Latin alphabets for Syriac (specifically for the C. Urmi dialect) were developed in the USSR with some material promulgated. Although they did not supplant the Syriac script, the usage of the Latin script in the Syriac community has still become widespread because most of the Assyrian diaspora is in Europe and the Anglosphere, where the Latin alphabet is predominant.

In Syriac romanization, some letters are altered and would feature diacritics and macrons to indicate long vowels, schwas and diphthongs. The letters with diacritics and macrons are mostly upheld in educational or formal writing.

Soviet Latin alphabet
| A | B | C | Ç | D | E | Ə | F | G | H | I | J | K | L | M | N | O | P | Q | R | S | Ş | T | Ţ | U | V | X | Z | Ƶ | Ь | IJ/ЬJ (digraph) |

Soviet Cyrillic alphabet (some Latin letters are used)
| A | Ə | Б | В | Г | Һ | D | E | Ж | З | И | J | К | Q | L | М | Н | O | П | Р | С | Т | t | У | Ф | Х | Ш | Ч | Ы | DЖ (digraph) |

The Latin letters below are commonly used when it comes to transliteration from the Syriac script to Latin:

Transliterated Syriac-Latin alphabet
| A | Ā | B | Ḇ | C | D | Ḏ | E | Ē | Ĕ | F | G | H | Ḥ | I | J | K | Ḵ | L | M | N | O | Ō | P | Q | R | S | Š | Ṣ | T | Ṭ | Ṯ | U | Ū | V | W | X | Y | Z |

- Ā is used to denote a long "a" sound or [ɑː] as heard in "car".
- Ḏ is used to represent a voiced dental fricative [ð], the "th" sound as heard in "that".
- Ē is used to denote a long close-mid unrounded vowel, [eː].
- Ĕ is to represent an "eh" sound or [ɛ], as heard in Ninwĕ
- Ḥ represents a voiceless pharyngeal fricative ([ħ]), only upheld by Turoyo and Chaldean speakers.
- Ō represents a long "o" sound or [ɔː].
- Š is a voiceless postalveolar fricative ([ʃ]), the English digraph "sh".
- Ṣ denotes an emphatic "s" or "thick s", [sˤ].
- Ṭ is an emphatic "t", [tˤ], as heard in the Urmi/Nochiya-Assyrian word ṭla ("three").
- Ū is used to represent an "oo" sound or the close back rounded vowel [uː].

Sometimes additional letters may be used and they tend to be:

- Ḇ may be used in the transliteration of biblical Aramaic to show the voiced bilabial fricative allophone value ("v") of the letter Bēṯ.
- Ī denotes a schwa sound, usually when transliterating biblical Aramaic.
- Ḵ is utilized for the voiceless velar fricative, [x], or the "kh" sound.
- Ṯ is used to denote the "th" sound or the voiceless dental fricative, [θ].

== Unicode ==
The Syriac alphabet was added to the Unicode Standard in September, 1999 with the release of version 3.0. Additional letters for Suriyani Malayalam were added in June, 2017 with the release of version 10.0.

=== Blocks ===
The Unicode block for Syriac is U+0700–U+074F:

Syriac^{[1]}^{[2]} Official Unicode Consortium code chart (PDF)
| | 0 | 1 | 2 | 3 | 4 | 5 | 6 | 7 | 8 | 9 | A | B | C | D | E | F |
| U+070x | ܀ | ܁ | ܂ | ܃ | ܄ | ܅ | ܆ | ܇ | ܈ | ܉ | ܊ | ܋ | ܌ | ܍ | | SAM |
| U+071x | ܐ | ܑ | ܒ | ܓ | ܔ | ܕ | ܖ | ܗ | ܘ | ܙ | ܚ | ܛ | ܜ | ܝ | ܞ | ܟ |
| U+072x | ܠ | ܡ | ܢ | ܣ | ܤ | ܥ | ܦ | ܧ | ܨ | ܩ | ܪ | ܫ | ܬ | ܭ | ܮ | ܯ |
| U+073x | ܰ | ܱ | ܲ | ܳ | ܴ | ܵ | ܶ | ܷ | ܸ | ܹ | ܺ | ܻ | ܼ | ܽ | ܾ | ܿ |
| U+074x | ݀ | ݁ | ݂ | ݃ | ݄ | ݅ | ݆ | ݇ | ݈ | ݉ | ݊ | | | ݍ | ݎ | ݏ |
Notes 1.As of Unicode version 18.0 2.Grey areas indicate non-assigned code points

The Syriac Abbreviation (a type of overline) can be represented with a special control character called the Syriac Abbreviation Mark (U+070F).

The Unicode block for Suriyani Malayalam specific letters is called the Syriac Supplement block and is U+0860–U+086F:

Syriac Supplement^{[1]}^{[2]} Official Unicode Consortium code chart (PDF)
| | 0 | 1 | 2 | 3 | 4 | 5 | 6 | 7 | 8 | 9 | A | B | C | D | E | F |
| U+086x | ࡠ | ࡡ | ࡢ | ࡣ | ࡤ | ࡥ | ࡦ | ࡧ | ࡨ | ࡩ | ࡪ | | | | | |
Notes 1.As of Unicode version 18.0 2.Grey areas indicate non-assigned code points

=== HTML code table ===
Note: HTML numeric character references can be in decimal format (&#DDDD;) or hexadecimal format (&#xHHHH;). For example, &#1813; and &#x0715; (1813 in decimal) both represent U+0715 SYRIAC LETTER DALATH.

==== Ālep̄ bēṯ ====
| ܕ | ܓ | ܒ | ܐ |
| &#1813; | &#1811; | &#1810; | &#1808; |
| ܚ | ܙ | ܘ | ܗ |
| &#1818; | &#1817; | &#1816; | &#1815; |
| ܠ | ܟܟ | ܝ | ܛ |
| &#1824; | &#1823; | &#1821; | &#1819; |
| ܥ | ܣ | ܢܢ | ܡܡ |
| &#1829; | &#1828; | &#1826; | &#1825; |
| ܪ | ܩ | ܨ | ܦ |
| &#1834; | &#1833; | &#1832; | &#1830; |
| | | ܬ | ܫ |
| | | &#1836; | &#1835; |

==== Vowels and unique characters ====
| ܲ | ܵ |
| &#1842; | &#1845; |
| ܸ | ܹ |
| &#1848; | &#1849; |
| ܼ | ܿ |
| &#1852; | &#1855; |
| ̈ | ̰ |
| &#776; | &#816; |
| ݁ | ݂ |
| &#1857; | &#1858; |
| ܀ | ܂ |
| &#1792; | &#1794; |
| ܄ | ݇ |
| &#1796; | &#1863; |

== Comparison of scripts ==
Matthew 5:8 (sixth beatitude), using the Urmi dialect:

| Syriac script | Latin script (1930) | Cyrillic script (before 1929, after 1938) | Translation |
|---|---|---|---|
| ܛܘܼܒ̣ܵܐ ܠܐܵܢܝܼ ܕܝܼܢܵܐ ܕܸܟ̣ܝܹ̈ܐ ܒܠܸܒܵܐ: ܣܵܒܵܒ ܕܐܵܢܝܼ ܒܸܬ ܚܵܙܝܼ ܠܐܲܠܵܗܵܐ. | Ţuva l'ənij d'inə dixji b'liввə: səвəв d'ənij вit xəzij l'Ələhə. | Tyвə l'aниj d'инa dиxjи б'lиббa: caбaб d'aниj бит xaзиj l'Alaha. | Blessed are the pure in heart: for they shall see God. |

== See also ==
- Abjad
- Alphabet
- Aramaic alphabet
- Mandaic alphabet
- Mongolian script
- Sogdian alphabet
- Syriac language
- Syriac Malayalam
- Old Uyghur alphabet
- History of the alphabet
- List of writing systems

== Sources ==
- Coakley, J. F. (2002). Robinson's Paradigms and Exercises in Syriac Grammar (5th ed.). Oxford University Press. ISBN 978-0-19-926129-1.
- Hatch, William (1946). An Album of Dated Syriac Manuscripts. Boston: The American Academy of Arts and Sciences, reprinted in 2002 by Gorgias Press. ISBN 1-931956-53-7.
- Kiraz, George (2015). The Syriac Dot: a Short History. Piscataway, NJ: Gorgias Press. ISBN 978-1-4632-0425-9.
- Michaelis, Ioannis Davidis (1784). Grammatica Syriaca.
- Nestle, Eberhard (1888). Syrische Grammatik mit Litteratur, Chrestomathie und Glossar. Berlin: H. Reuther's Verlagsbuchhandlung. [translated to English as Syriac grammar with bibliography, chrestomathy and glossary, by R. S. Kennedy. London: Williams & Norgate 1889].
- Nöldeke, Theodor and Julius Euting (1880). Kurzgefasste syrische Grammatik. Leipzig: T.O. Weigel. [translated to English as Compendious Syriac Grammar, by James A. Crichton. London: Williams & Norgate 1904. 2003 edition: ISBN 1-57506-050-7].
- Phillips, George (1866). A Syriac Grammar. Cambridge: Deighton, Bell, & Co.; London: Bell & Daldy.
- Robinson, Theodore Henry (1915). Paradigms and Exercises in Syriac Grammar. Oxford University Press. ISBN 0-19-926129-6.
- Rudder, Joshua. Learn to Write Aramaic: A Step-by-Step Approach to the Historical & Modern Scripts. n.p.: CreateSpace Independent Publishing Platform, 2011. 220 pp. ISBN 978-1461021421 Includes the Estrangela (pp. 59–113), Madnhaya (pp. 191–206), and the Western Serto (pp. 173–190) scripts.
- Segal, J. B. (1953). The Diacritical Point and the Accents in Syriac. Oxford University Press, reprinted in 2003 by Gorgias Press. ISBN 1-59333-032-4.
- Thackston, Wheeler M. (1999). Introduction to Syriac. Bethesda, MD: Ibex Publishers, Inc. ISBN 0-936347-98-8.
