= Syriac =

Syriac may refer to:

- Suret, a Neo-Aramaic language
- Syriac alphabet, a writing system primarily used to write the Syriac language
  - Syriac (Unicode block)
  - Syriac Supplement
- Syriac Christianity, a branch of Eastern Christianity
- Syriac language, an Eastern Middle Aramaic dialect
- Syriac literature, literature in the Syriac language
- Syriac studies, the study of the Syriac language and Syriac Christianity
- Syriacs (term), term used as designations for Syriac Christians
- Syriac people, self-identified Syriac Christian ethnicities

== See also ==
- Syriac Rite (disambiguation)
- Syrian (disambiguation)
- Syria (disambiguation)
- Suriyani (disambiguation)
