= Syriac Rite =

The term Syriac Rite or Syrian Rite may refer to:

- West Syriac Rite, liturgical rite of the Syriac Orthodox Church, Malankar and the Syriac Catholic Church
- East Syriac Rite, liturgical rite of the Assyrian Church of the East, Malabar Church and the Chaldean Catholic Church and Syriac Orthodox Church's East Syriac liturgy of Saint James

== See also ==
- Rite (disambiguation)
- Syriac (disambiguation)
- Syriac Christianity
