= Extermination order =

An extermination order is an order given by a government sanctioning mass removal or death. The term is often associated with genocide.

Extermination orders were issued in conjunction with the following events:

- Armenian genocide
- California Genocide
- The Holocaust, which did not have an extermination order, involved the extermination of millions of Jews
  - Extermination camp, also known as "death camp"
- Missouri Executive Order 44, often called the "Mormon Extermination Order" (alt. "exterminating order") within the Latter Day Saint movement
- The Order of Extermination of the Nayars by Tippu Sultan during Mysore's invasion of Kerala.

Extermination orders can also include:

- No quarter, a term that is used when an order is given for the complete extermination of an enemy, without accepting any offer of surrender
- Decimation (Roman army), a punishment in the Roman Army
