= Mysore invasion of Chirakkal =

- Part of Mysorean invasion of Malabar
| Date | 1766 |
| Location | Chirakkal |
| Result | Mysore victory |
| Territorial changes | Chirakkal annexed to Mysore |

Belligerents
| Kingdom of Chirakkal | Kingdom of Mysore; Arakkal Kingdom |

Commanders and leaders
| King of Chirakkal (executed) | (Kingdom of Mysore) Hyder Ali; Ali Raja |

The Mysore invasion of Chirakkal took place in 1766. The Kingdom of Mysore defeated and occupied the lands of Kingdom of Chirakkal. Hyder Ali killed the King of Chirakkal and made Cannanore independent for Ali Raja who helped him in the invasion.

== Background ==
Chirakkal was a Kingdom in Malabar. It was ruled by Chirakkal kings until 1766. Hyder Ali, the Sultan of Mysore invaded Chirakkal with the help of Ali Raja, the King of Arakkal Kingdom. Tipu made the territories of Cannanore independent and handed it over to Ali Raja.
