= Madhya Kalari =

- Also known as: Madhya Sampradāyam
- Focus: Footwork
- Hardness: Full-contact, semi-contact
- Country of origin: India
- Parenthood: Kalaripayattu
- Ancestor arts: Vadakkan Kalari, Thekkan Kalari
- Olympic sport: No
- Meaning: Central Kalari
- Martial art: Kalaripayattu

Madhya Kalari (transl. Central Kalari; or Madhya Sampradāyam: transl. Central tradition) is a style of martial art of Kalaripayattu practiced in the central region of Kerala, India.

== Characteristics ==
Contrary to popular belief, it is a composite of the Northern and Southern forms of Kalaripayattu, but also has its own distinctive techniques, which are performed within floor paths known as kalam. Madhya Kalari has many different styles which place heavy emphasis on lower body strength and speed through thorough practice of various chuvadu, or forms, and meypayattu, or exercises. After mastery over basic chuvadu and meypayattu, the practitioner may advance into weaponry and advanced studies.

== See also ==
- Mamankam festival

== Bibliography ==
- Luijendijk, D.H. (2005) Kalarippayat: India's Ancient Martial Art, Paladin Press, ISBN 1-58160-480-7
- Luijendijk, D.H. (2008) Kalarippayat: The Essence and Structure of an Indian Martial Art, Oprat, ISBN 978-1-4092-2626-0
