= Mamankam =

Indian festival

Māmāngam മാമാങ്കം
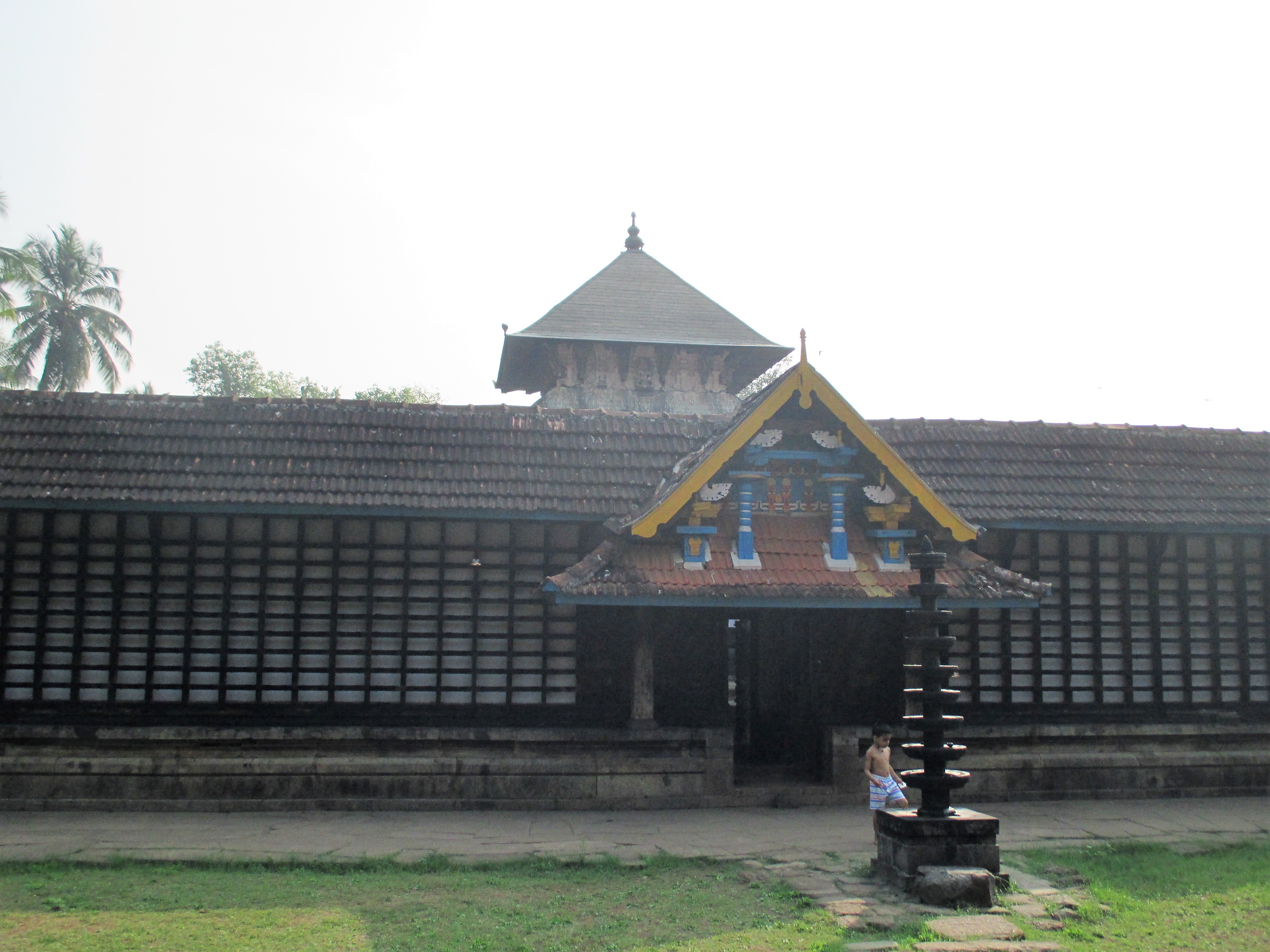
- Tirunavaya Temple
- Genre: Trade fair religious festival
- Frequency: 12 years
- Location: Tirunāvāya (present-day Kerala)
- Country: India

Māmānkam or Māmāngam was a duodecennial medieval fair held on the bank, and on the dry river-bed, of Pērār (River Nil̥a, River Ponnani, or Bhārathappuzha) at Tirunāvāya, southern India. The temple associated with the festival was Nava Mukunda Temple in Tirunavaya. It seems to have begun as a temple festival, analogous to the Kumbha Melas at Ujjaini, Prayaga, Haridwar and Kumbakonam.

Tirunāvāya, is known for its ancient Hindu temples. The festival was most flamboyantly celebrated under the auspices and at the expenses of the Hindu chiefs of Kōzhikōde (Calicut), the Samutiris (the Zamorins). The fair was not only a religious festival for the Samutiris, but also an occasion for the display of all their pomp and power as the most powerful chiefs of Kerala. During the Mamankam it was believed that the goddess Ganga descended into the Perar and by her miraculous advent made the river as holy as the Ganges itself. Much like the famous Kumbha Mēḷas, the fair is held once in every 12 years and carried huge economic, social and political significance. Apart from the brisk trading, attested by travelers from Arabia, Greece and China, various forms of martial art and intellectual contests, cultural festivals, Hindu ritual ceremonies and folk art performances were held at Tirunāvāya. Hindu pilgrims from distant places, trading groups and travelers also leave colorful accounts of Māmānkam. Duarte Barbosa mentions "scaffoldings erected in the field with silken hangings spread over it". Kozhikode Granthavari, Mamakam Kilippattu and Kandaru Menon Patappattu, along with Keralolpatti and Keralamahatmya, are the major native chronicles mentioning the Mamankam festival.

The innate nature of the festival, dateable at least to the era before the Cheras of Cranganore (c. 800-1124 CE), muddled in myths and legends, is still disputed. As per some sources, the nature of the fair underwent tragic changes after the capture of Tirunāvāya by the chief of Kōzhikōde from the Veḷḷāṭṭiri chief. From that day forth, the Vaḷḷuvanāṭu chiefs started to send warriors to kill the Sāmūtiri (who was personally present at the fair with all his kith and kin) and regain the honor of conducting the festival. This led to a long drawn rivalry and bloodshed between these two clans.

As per K. V. Krishna Iyer, the last Māmānkam fair was held in 1755 CE. The Māmānkam came to an end with the conquest of Kōzhikōde by the Sultān of Mysōre, Ḥaidar ʿAlī (1766 CE) and the subsequent Treaty of Seringapatam (1792) with the English East India Company. Canganpaḷḷi Kaḷari, Paḻukkāmandapam, Nilapāṭu Tara, Marunnara and Manikkiṇar at Tirunāvāya are protected (Protected Monuments) by the State Archaeology Department, Kēral̥a.

== Etymology ==
The word "Māmānkam" is sometimes considered as a Malayālam corruption of two Sanskrit words, one perhaps related to the Māgha month (January – February). According to William Logan, "Maha Makham" means literally "Great Sacrifice".

Different renderings of the name is given below,

- Maha-Magham - Great Magha (K. V. Krishna Iyer)
- Maha-Makham - Great Sacrifice (William Logan and K. P. Padmanabha Menon)
- Maha-Maham - Great Festival
- Maha-Ankam - Great Fight
- Magha Makam - Elamkulam P. N. Kunjan Pillai

== Background ==
Tirunavaya (Navayogipuram on Brhannadi in Kerala Mahatmya) seems to be a very sacred place for the Hindus of Kerala from time immemorial. Perar at Tirunavaya is considered to assume a special sanctity, because it flows between the temple of god Vishnu (Nava Mukunda) on its right bank and temples of Brahma and Siva on its left. Tirunavaya, on the fertile Perar basin, must have been one of the earliest Brahmin settlement in Kerala. Perar also acts as the main artery of communication with the interior Kerala lands, otherwise inaccessible due to the thick vegetation, in the rainy season. Rivers and backwaters in Kerala afforded the easiest and cheapest and almost only means of communication in times when wheeled traffic and pack-bullock traffic were unknown. And accordingly it is found that the Brahmins settled most thickly close to or on the rivers and selected sites for their settlements so as to command as much as possible of these arteries of traffic.

=== Legendary origins ===
The following is a description of the origins of the festival, prior to the hegemony of the chiefs of Valluvanatu over the Mamankam, based on native legends and myths

The fair was initially conducted by the landlords, led by an executive officer styled the Rakshapurusha ("the Great Protector of the Four Kalakas"). Each Rakshapurusha was to continue in office only for three years. Once some dispute arose as to the selection of the next Great Protector, in the assembly at Tirunavaya, and principle four section (which then composed the assembly) having failed to agree as to the selection of their executive officer resolved at last to select one to rule over them, and for this purpose they traveled, and chose one prince from a kingdom on the east of the Western Ghats. The Brahmins brought a prince to Tirunavaya, placed him on a seat of honor on the banks of Perar, and proclaimed him "Perumal of Kerala". According to the original engagement with the prince, he was to continue as ruler only for a term of 12 years, at end of which he was to retire into private life or to leave the country altogether.

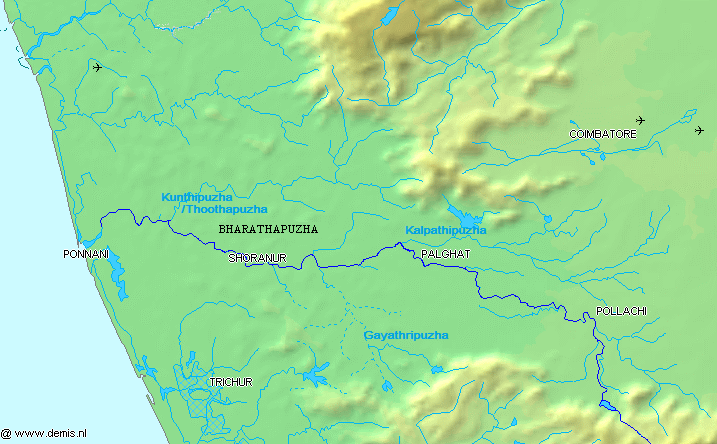
Perar (River Ponnani)

The coronation of this first king of Kerala took place on Pushya in the month of Magha in Karkitaka Vyazham, and this day in every cycle of Jupiter thus became important in the history of Kerala because the reign of each Perumal terminated on that day, he being elected for 12 years. This event was commemorated with a Great Feast, at which all Brahmin nobles and the chiefs of Kerala attended. On the 28th day the retiring Perumal appeared before the Brahmin assembly and the laid of the Sword of the Perumal, and the assembly declares the throne vacant. Another was then elected and crowned Perumal for another 12 years. This Great Feast and coronation occurring in Magha month, that month in every Karkitaka Vyazham was known was Maha Magha, or Mamankam in Tamil.

According to Francis Wrede, the Chera Perumals of Cranganore used to preside over the Mamankams. So it seems, at first conducted by the Brahmins, the fair came to be celebrated the aegis of the Chera rulers of Cranganore. Even in latter Samutiri times, the first invitation letter to participate in the Mamankam was addressed to the Pandyas, a reminiscence of the Chera days.

==== The Great Sacrifice ====
Alexander Hamilton, in his A New Account of the East Indies, Vol. I, gives a different account of the initial nature of the festival. According to him, it was a custom for the king of Kerala to rule only for 12 years. The king was obliged to kill himself, by cutting his own throat on a public scaffold erected in view of the Brahmin assembly, after completing his 12-year term. The king's body was a little while after burned with great pomp and ceremony, and the Brahmins elected a new king for the next term. The Kerala Mahatmya corroborates this account, declaring that the king used to be deposed at the Mamankam, but there is no mention of a suicide. According to Duarte Barbosa the king goes to bathe at a temple tank with much fanfare. Thereafter, he prays before the idol and mounts to the scaffolding, and there, before all the people, he takes a very sharp knife, cuts off his throat himself and he performs this sacrifice to the idol. Whoever desires to reign for the next 12 years and undertake this martyrdom for the idol, has to be present looking on at this, and from that place the Brahmins proclaim him the new king.(Duarte Barbosa mentions this to be the kingdom of Quilacare and not Calicut of which he has given very detailed accounts of the life and customs of the people there including the Samutiri in the first chapter of vol 2) Sir James Frazer also supports this view in his extensive studies.

=== Land tenures ===
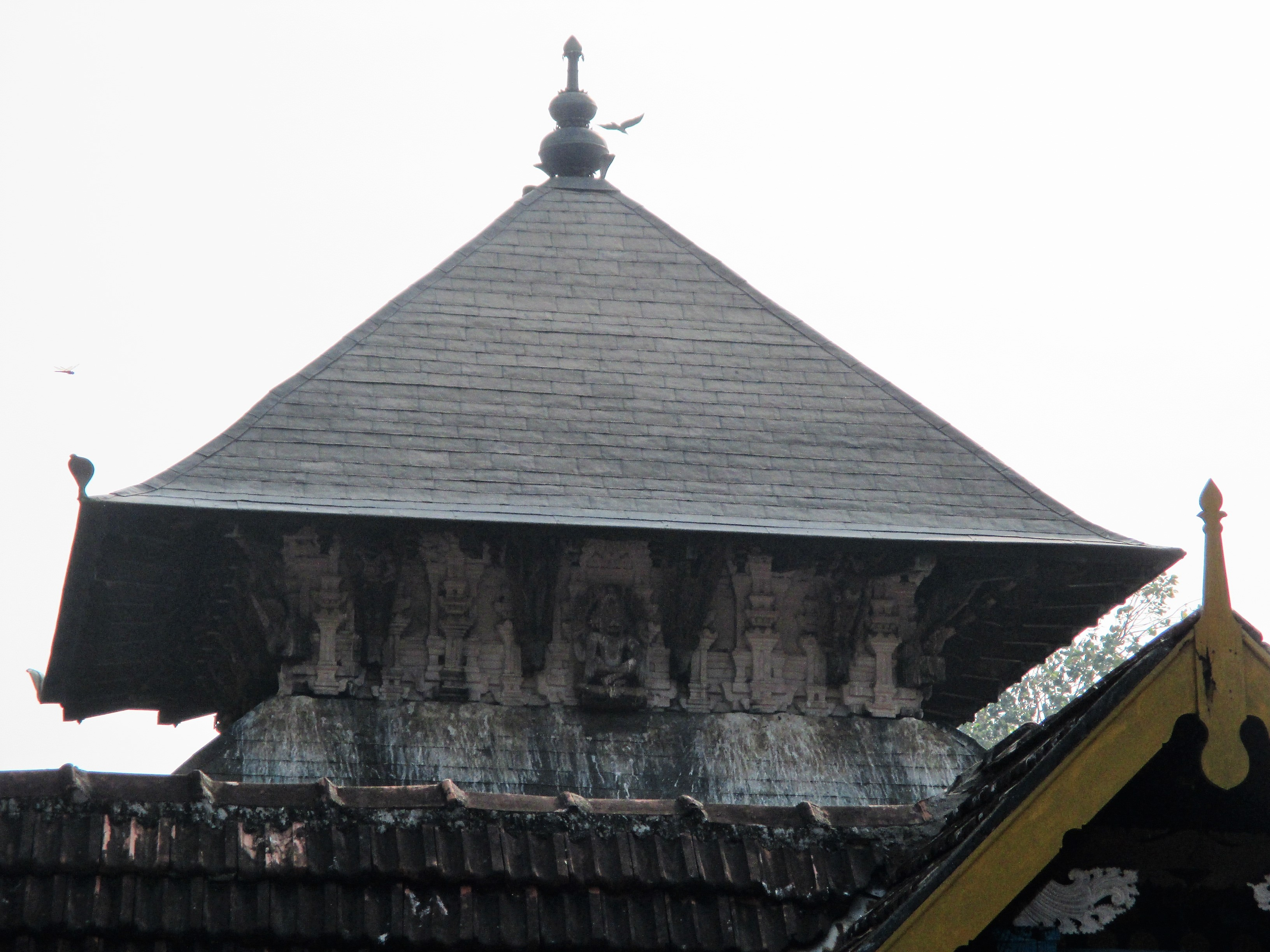
Tirunavaya Temple

Jonathan Duncan, in his "Transactions of the Bombay Literary Society", mentions at each recurring Mamankam festival all feudal ties were broken, and the parties, assembled in public conclave at Tirunavaya, readjusted at such times all existing relations among themselves. At the end of the Feast all prior leases of land were considered to be at an end and fresh grants were to be obtained at the beginning of the next reign.

By ancient customs, even in Travancore, all tenures were to continue for a maximum period of twelve years to be renewed thereafter. But it is known that this idealistic proposition did not work satisfactorily in Kerala.

=== Vellattiri as Rakshapurusha (Great Protector) ===
The native traditions continue to describe the evolution of the festival in the following manner

When the influence of the Perumal increased in course of time, they refused to abdicate after 12 years, and the practice of fighting for the crown by warriors, at Tirunavaya, came in vogue. The Perumal of Cranganore attended the Great Feast as before, but, instead of abdicating the crown in the presence of Brahmins, he seated himself in a tent pitched for him at Tirunavaya, strongly guarded by a body of spearmen and lancers. The candidate of the kingship was to force his way through this warriors and to kill the Perumal. Theoretically, he who succeeded in thus killing the Perumal was immediately proclaimed and crowned Perumal for the next term of 12 years. If no one succeeded in killing the Perumal he was to reign for another 12 years. The last Perumal, now identified by historians as Cheraman Rama Varma Kulasekhara (ruled c. 1089-1124 CE), is said to have ruled for 36 years by surviving three Mamankams at Tirunavaya.

The last Chera Perumal Rama Kulasekhara conferred the chief of Valluvanatu the "right" to conduct the Mamankam fair as the Rakshapurusha - the Great Protector with 10,000 Nair warriors. The Perumal also assigned to him, the Tirumandhamkunnattu Bhagavati, sacred to the Brahmins of Chovvaram, as his guardian deity. It was also Tirunavaya that the Chera Perumal of Cranganore is supposed to have made his partition of Kerala.

=== Zamorin's capture of Mamankam ===
It would appear that the project against the Vellattiri, as the chief of Valluvanatu was called, was first suggested by the "Koya" of Kozhikode. The Koya of Kozhikode, chief of the influential Muslim merchants, was title of the royal port officer at Kozhikode. When the chief of Kozhikode protested that it was beyond his means, the Koya offered his military assistance. Immediately the Koya proceeded by sea, with his ships and men, and the Samutiri warriors by land to Tirunavaya, and subduing little chiefs, villages and Hindu temples on the way. It seems, before Jupiter completed his cycle, the chief of Kozhikode captured Tirunavaya, proclaimed himself as the Great Protector and took over right of conducting the Mamankam fair. The chief of Kozhikode seems to have granted the Koya inexhaustible wealth, and caused him to "stand on his right side".

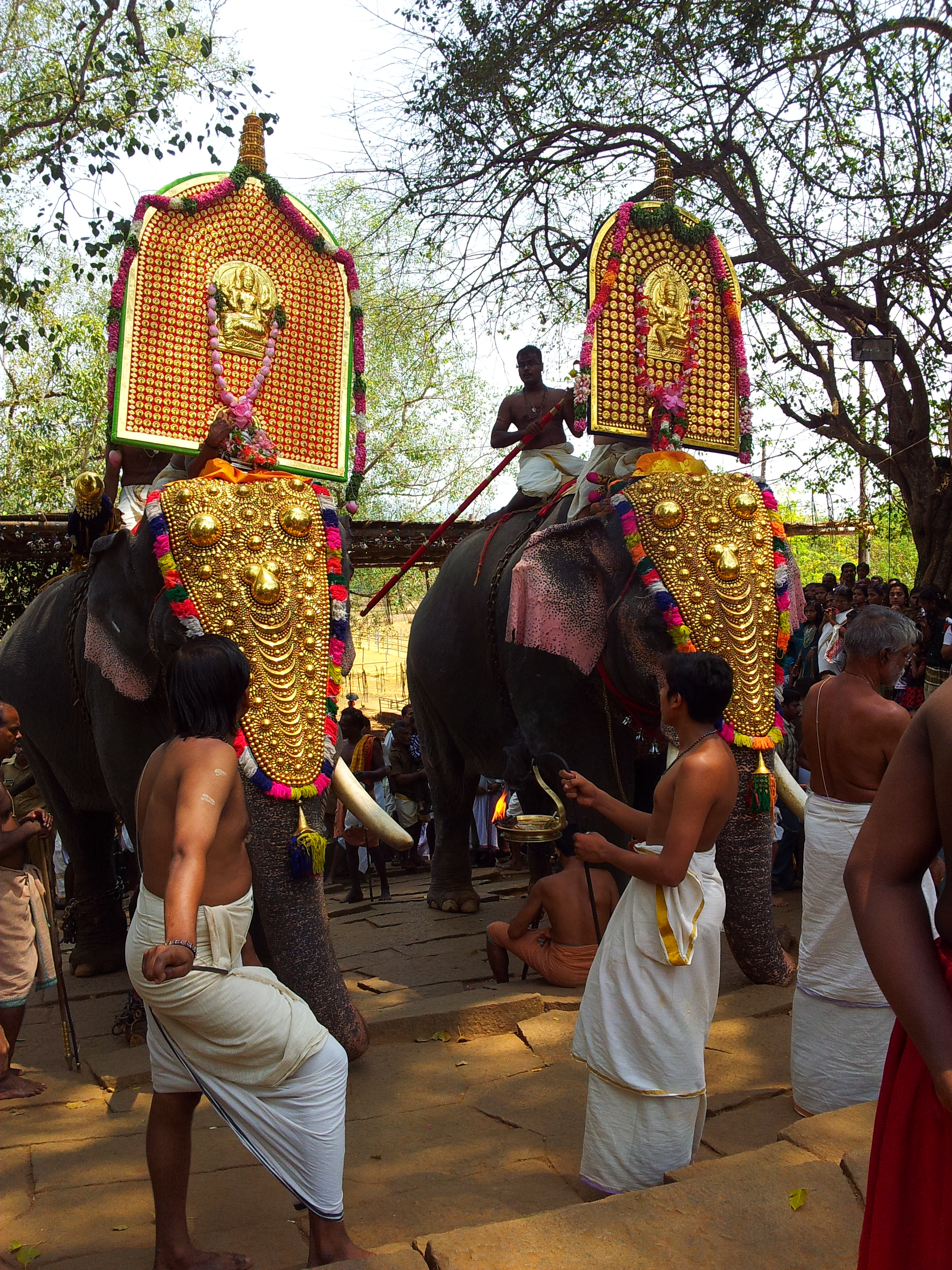
A view from the puram at Tirumanthamkunnu (kotikkayattam after the arattu)

Another version represents the Koya securing this privilege to his chief by a stratagem. This version of the legend seems suggest friendly relations existed between the Koya and the chief of Valluvanatu, as well as with the chief of Kozhikode. In one Mamankam fair, the followers of the chief of Kozhikode managed to penetrate through the bodyguards of the Vellattiri chief and kill him on the Vakayur platform (Manittara). Still another version has it that the chief of Kozhikode promised to marry the Koya's daughter if the enterprise ended in success. But the Kozhikode chief began to repent of his rash and hasty offer, as it involved "the loss of caste". It was arranged that when he came to Kozhikode he should receive, as soon as he crossed the river at Kallai, betel and tobacco from the hands of a Muslim man dressed as a woman - this being considered tantamount to a marriage.

The rivalry between the two Brahmin settlements (Panniyur and Chovvaram) also seems to give the chief of Kozhikode a pretext to attack the Vellattiri. Visscher, in his "Letters from Malabar", Letter VIII, writes, "so has the trumpet of battle blown by the Panniyur and Chovvaram often summoned the chiefs of Kerala to mutual hostilities". The rivalry is also mentioned by de Couto in Decades (Vol V, Sec 1, Chap. 1).

The immediate pretext of the Kozhikode's occupation of Tirunavaya was invasion Tirumanasseri Natu by its neighbors on either side, the Valluvanatu (Arangottu Swarupam) and Perumpatappu Swarupam. Tirumanasseri natu was a small chiefdom at the mouth of Perar, ruled by a Brahmin. The chiefdom, nominally subordinate to the Arangottu, had access to the sea at port Ponnani, and was bounded by Perar in the north. The Brahmin chief of Tirumanasseri was the head of the Panniyur Namputiris and was considered the protector of all the Brahmins living between Perinchellur and Chenganur, and he enjoyed koyma right over thirteen temples including that of Talipparamba. He was the leader of the Namputiri Samghas of Kolattur, and had 3000 Nair warriors under him. The chief of Tirumanasseri Natu appealed to the chief of Kozhikode for help, and ceded the port Ponnani as price of his protection. The Kozhikkode warriors advanced by land and sea. The main army, commanded by the Zamorin himself, approached Tirunavaya from north. The Eralpatu, proceeding by sea, occupied port Ponnani and Tirumanasseri Natu, and attacked the Vellattiri from west. The campaign was bitter and protracted, so much so the Kozhikode despairing of success, sought divine help by propitiating Valayanatu Bhagavati, the tutelary deity of Vellattiris. The battles were at last decided by the death of two princes belonging to the clan of Vellattiri.

=== Rewards from Kozhikode ===
All those who taken part in the battles, it seems, received liberal rewards from Kozhikode.

- Koya of Kozhikode, with the Persian title "Shah Bantar", was given all the privileges and dignities of a Nair chief, jurisdiction over all the Muslims residing at Kozhikode bazar, the right to receive a small present from the Illuvas, the Kammalans and the Mukkuvans whenever the Kozhikode conferred any honors upon them (which they had at once report to him), to collect from the brokers at the rate of 10 fanams for every foreign ship that might put in at Kozhikode and levy a poll tax of 16 fanams at Pantarakkatavu and 12 fanams at Beypore, the privilege of sending Mappila drummers and pipers for every marriage and Kaliyattu, and the duty of removing the roof of any offender in Velapuram condemned to lose hearth and home. At Mamankam the Koya was in charge of the fireworks. He arranged for Kampaveti and Kalpalaka and also for mock fights between ships in Perar. Hamilton, in A New Account of the East Indies, Vol. 1. pages 306-8, records hearing guns firing for two or three days and nights successively.
  - Koya was given privilege of standing on the right side of the chief of Kozhikode on the Vakayur platform (Nilapatu Tara) on the last the day of the Mamankam fair
- Eralpatu, it seems, was given privilege of standing in state on the left bank of the Perar river whenever the Kozhikode chief appeared on the Vakayur platform on its right bank. The Munalpatu obtained the honor of standing in state under the Kuriyal, midway between the temple of Tirunavaya and Vakayur on the day of Ayilyam. The chief of Vettam, was conceded the same privilege as the Munalpatu, but his standing in state came on the day of Puyam. Tirumanasseri Namputiri was attached to the Eralpatu's suite in all the ceremonies connected with the Mamankam and Taipuyam and given the right of collecting a small fee during the fair from every merchant who set up his booth on the Perar river-bed.
- The chief of Cranganore was given the prerogative of supervising the feeding of the Brahmins throughout the Mamankam festival. Alexander Hamilton, who gives an account of the initial nature of the fair, mentions the "Great Feast" associated with the festival.

=== Tradition of chavers (suicidal warriors) ===
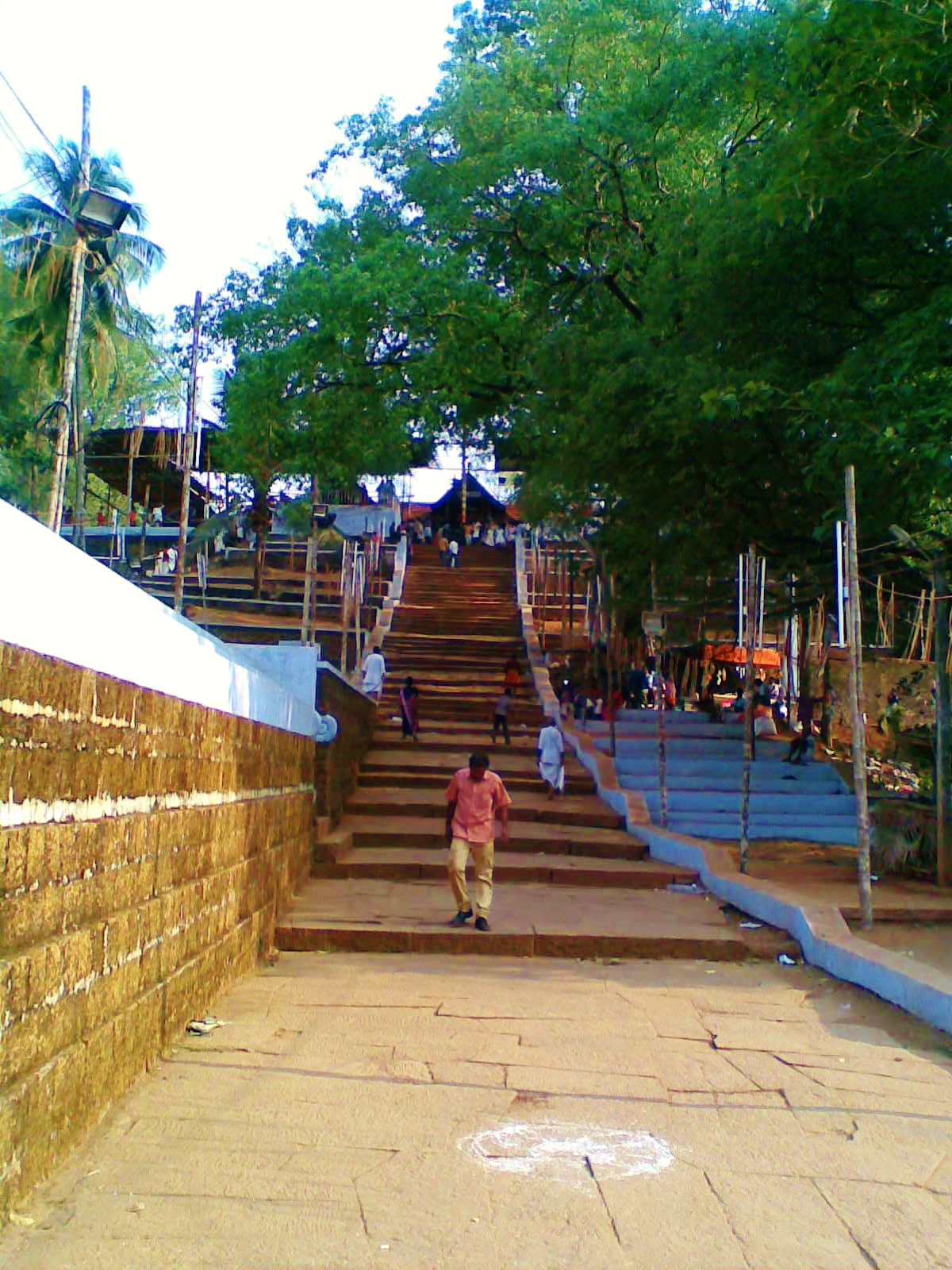
Northern nata of the Tirumandhamkunnu Temple

During the subsequent Mamankam fairs, all other chiefs of Kerala - including the ruler of Travancore - were obliged to send flags as a symbol of submission to Kozhikode. These flags were used to be hoisted at the festival. But the chief of Valluvanatu who did not recognize the Zamorin as the legitimate Great Protector but considered him only a "usurper" and used to send chavers (suicidal warriors) instead. If these men could kill the Zamorin, who was personally present at the fair and was protected by thousands of his own warriors, the right of Great Protector would have "devolved" on the chief of Valluvanatu. These chavers were Nair warriors who preferred death to defeat, and who sacrificed their lives (to avenge the death of Valluvanatu clan members in the battles leading to the fall of Tirunavaya). The death of the Vellaattiri clan members also started a period of intense hatred and battles between the two clans. Kutippaka or blood feud was prevalent in the medieval Kerala society. If a Nair warrior was killed (in his attempt to kill the Zamorin), it was the duty of the relatives or even the subsequent generations of the deceased to avenge the death. So, most of these chavers had lost their relatives or elders in previous battles with the Zamorin, and were fueled by kutippaka. They came from various parts of Valluvanatu, assembled at Thirumanthamkunnu (modern day Angadipuram) under Vellattiri, and were led by warriors from one of the four major Nair houses of Valluvanatu viz Putumanna Panikkars, Candrattu Panikkars, Vayankara Panikkars, and Verkotu Panikkars. Further details were provided by William Logan in his 1887 district manual Malabar and Francis Buchanan-Hamilton in his "A Journey from Madras through the Countries of Mysore, Canara, and Malabar" (1807), respectively.

Vellattiri, after losing Tirunavaya and the right of the Great Protector, began to conduct the puram festival in the place of Mamankam, at Angadipuram (medieval Valluvappalli), his capital. "Here in the temple of his tutelary deity Thirumanthamkunnu Bhagavati, he stood on a raised granite platform from where in the olden days his predecessors started the procession to Tirunavaya for the Mamankam fair in peace. It was from here that the warriors were sent to the Mamankam fair afterwards when Samutiri occupied it."

=== Vellattiri chavers ===
The Zamorin captured Tirunavaya in 1486 A.D. This date was first revealed by S. Rajendu in Arangode Granthavari. The Zamorin took over the karayma power of Tirunavaya temple from one of the chieftains of Valluvanad, Karuvayur Moosad. After the capture of Tirunavaya by Samutiri of Kozhikode, the fair often turned into battlefield. Gaspar Correia gives following description.

"A community of bodyguards of the ruling families...who in pledging their lives to the royal households [of Valluvanatu]...in avenging the death of two princes these [Calicut] guards dispersed, seeking wherever they might find men of Calicut, and amongst these they rushed fearless, killing and slaying till they were slain... they like desperate men played the devil before they were slain, and killed many people, with women and children."

The chavers (suicidal warriors), sent to kill the Zamorin, hailed from the four important Nair families of Valluvanatu. These families were:

- Putumanna Panikkars
- Chandrattu Panikkars
- Kovilkkatt Panikkars
- Verkotu Panikkars

A total of eighteen chiefs (chiefs under Vellattiri) of Valluvanatu went to the Mamankam fair, led by the lead Nair (Titled as Panikkar along with the family name) from each of the four main Nair families. Apart from the four lead warriors, the other fourteen hailed from the following families:

Two from unknown Valluvanatu families, two from Valluvanatu, two Muppil Nairs from the Valluvanatu ruling house, Acchan of Elampulakkatu, Variar of Kulattur, Pisharati of Uppamkalattil, Vellodi of Patiramana, Nair of Parakkattu, Nair of Kakkoottu, Nair of Mannarmala and Pisharati of Cerukara. Out of the eighteen local chiefs, thirteen were Nairs (mostly Menon-Panikkar section of Kiryatil Nair sub-caste), two were Nambutiri and three were Ambalavasi Brahmins.

== Historical descriptions ==
=== 1683 – Mamankam ===
Account of a Valluvanatu attack at the Mamankam held in 1683 is given by William Logan in his district manual (1887). This account was based on the Kozhikode Granthavaris –

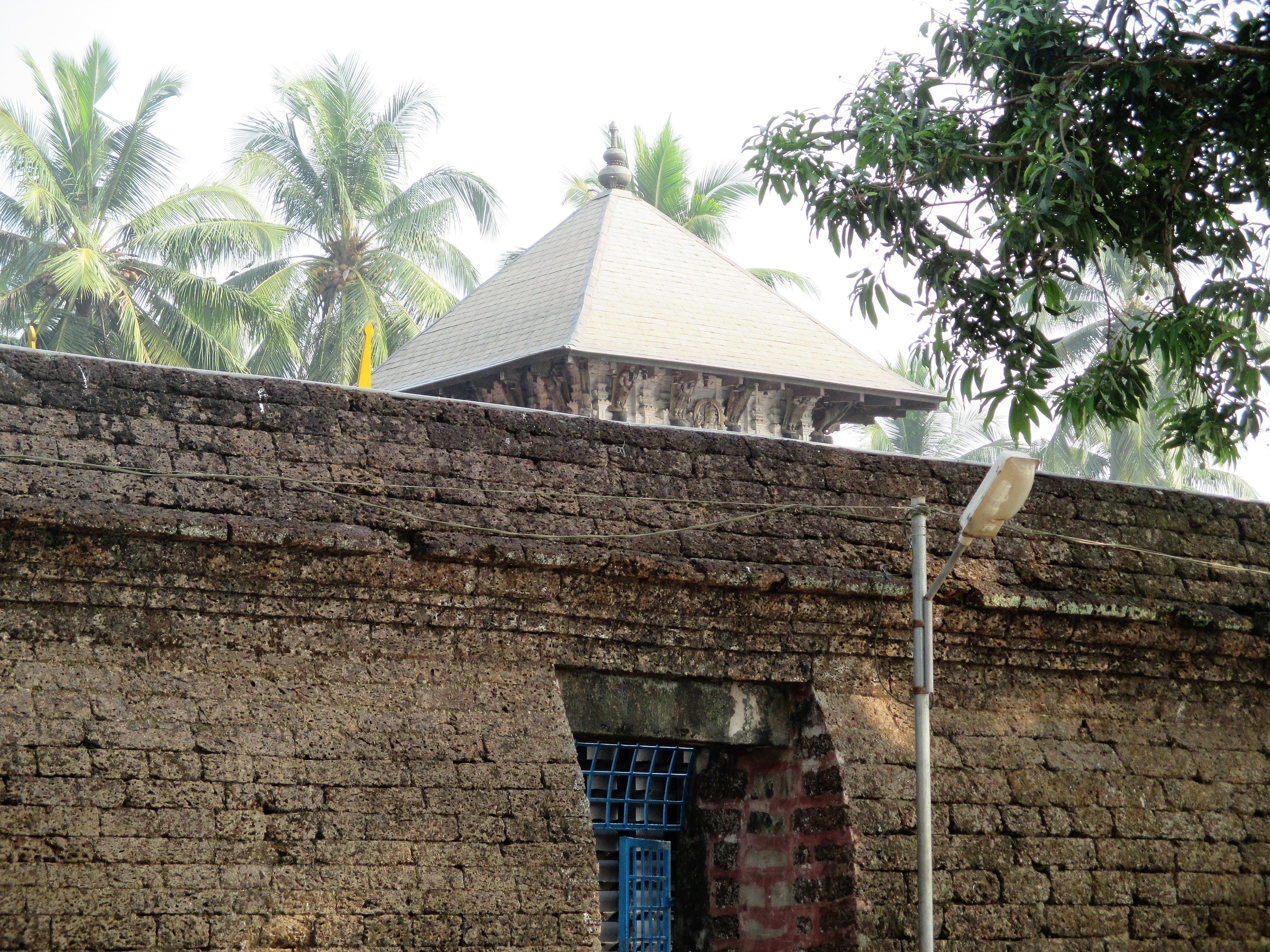
Tirunavaya Temple

"Amid much din and firing of guns the Samutiri, the warriors, the elect of the four Nair houses in Valluvanatu, step forth from the crowd and receive the last blessings and farewells of their friends and relatives. They have just partaken of the last meal they are to eat on earth at the house of the temple representative of their chieftain Vellattiri; they are decked with garlands and smeared with ashes. On this particular occasion it is one of the houses of Putumanna Panikkar who heads the fray. He is joined with seventeen of his friends – for all who so wish may fall in with sword and shields in support of the men who have elected to die.

Armed with swords and shields alone they rush at the spearmen thronging the palisades; they wind and turn their bodies, as if they had no bones, casting them forward and backward, high and low, even to the astonishment of the beholders, as worthy Master Johnson describes them in a passage already quoted. But notwithstanding the suppleness of their limbs, notwithstanding their delight and skill and dexterity in weapons, the result is inevitable, and is prosaically recorded in the chronicle thus: The number of warriors who came and died in the early morning the next day after the elephant began to be adorned with gold trappings – being Putumana Kantar Menon and followers – was eighteen.

At various times during the ten last days of the festival the same thing is repeated. Whenever the Samutiri of Kozhikode takes his stand on the terrace, assumes the sword (the Sword of the Chera king) and shakes it, men rush forth from the crowd on the west temple gate only to be impaled on the spears of the guardsmen who relieve each other from day to day."

=== 1695 – Mamankam ===
From A New Account of the East Indies, Volume I by Alexander Hamilton

In AD 1695 one of those jubilees happened, and the tent pitched near Ponnani, a seaport of his [Samutiri of Kozhikode], about fifteen leagues to the southward of Kozhikode. There were but three men that would venture on that desperate action [of killing the Samutiri on dais], who fell in, with sword and shield, among the guards, and, after they had killed and wounded many, were themselves killed. One of the desperados [Valluvanatu chavers] had a nephew of fifteen or sixteen years of age, that kept close by his uncle in the attack on the guards, and, when he saw him fall, the youth got through the guards into the tent, and made a stroke at Samutiri's head, and had certainly dispatched him, if a large brass lamp which was burning over his head, had not marred the blow; but, before he could make another, he was killed by the guards; and, I believe, the same Samutiri reigns yet. I chanced to come that time along the [Kerala] coast, and heard the guns for two or three days and nights successively.

== End of the Tradition ==
The last Mamankam festival was celebrated in 1755, marking the conclusion of a centuries-old tradition that had defined the political and cultural landscape of medieval Malabar. The decline of the ceremony was precipitated by the Mysorean invasion of Malabar in 1766, led by Hyder Ali, which destabilised the authority of the Samutiri (Zamorin) and dismantled the traditional feudal structures of the region. Following the subsequent British annexation of Malabar and the establishment of colonial administrative control, the geopolitical necessity for such a grand display of sovereign "pomp and power" vanished. Consequently, the duodecennial assembly at Tirunavaya was never revived, transitioning from a living political and military event into a subject of historical and archaeological significance.

- The end of the Mamankam tradition is generally attributed to the mid-18th century, but different historians and historical records provide nuances regarding the specific causes and the exact timeline of its decline.

Year	Source
1743	William Logan, K. P. Padmanabha Menon and P. K. S. Raja
1755	K. V. Krishna Ayyar
1766	Another view by K. V. Krishna Ayyar, N. M. Nampoothiri

== Archaeology and preservation ==
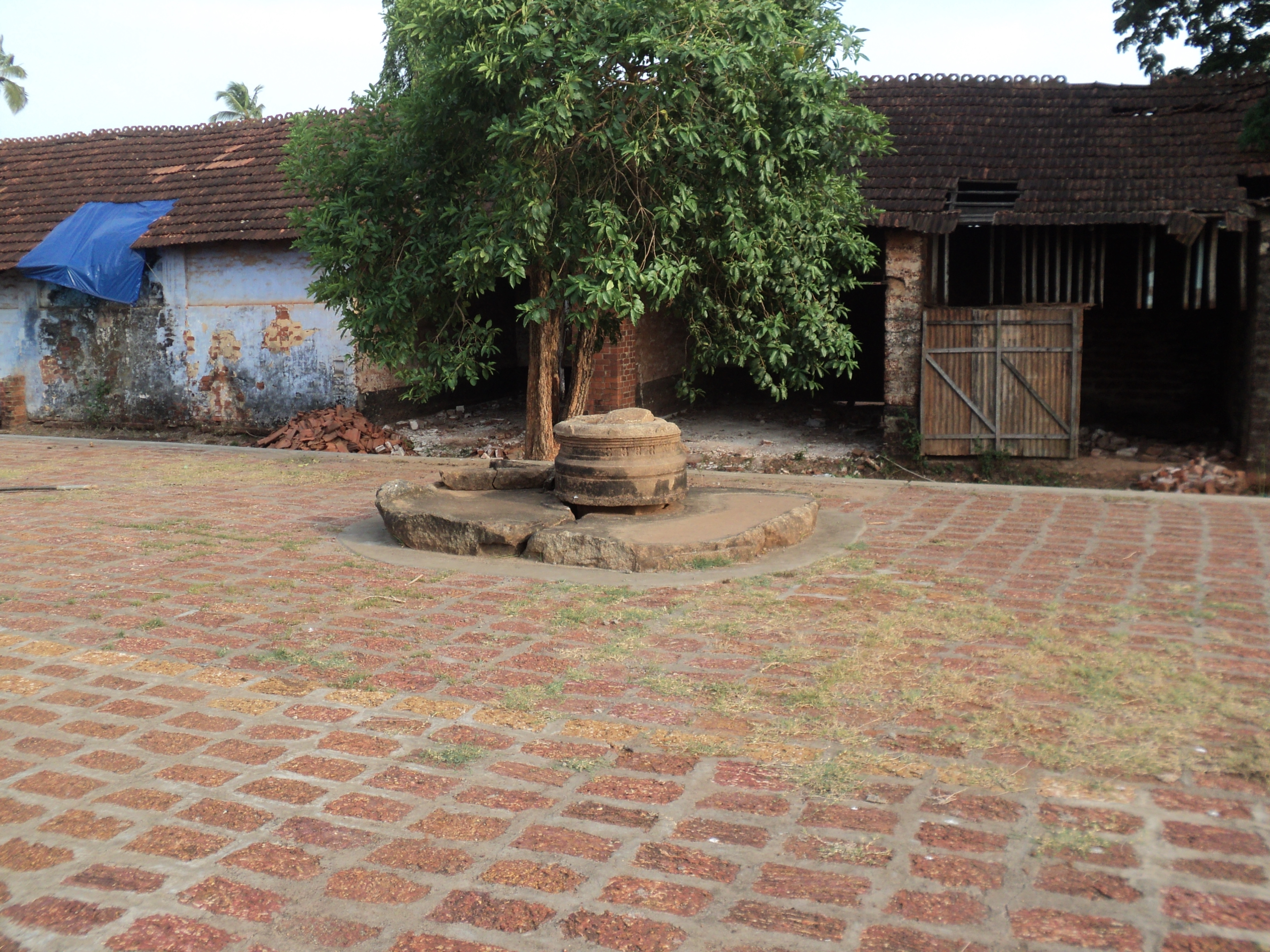
Nilapadu Thara

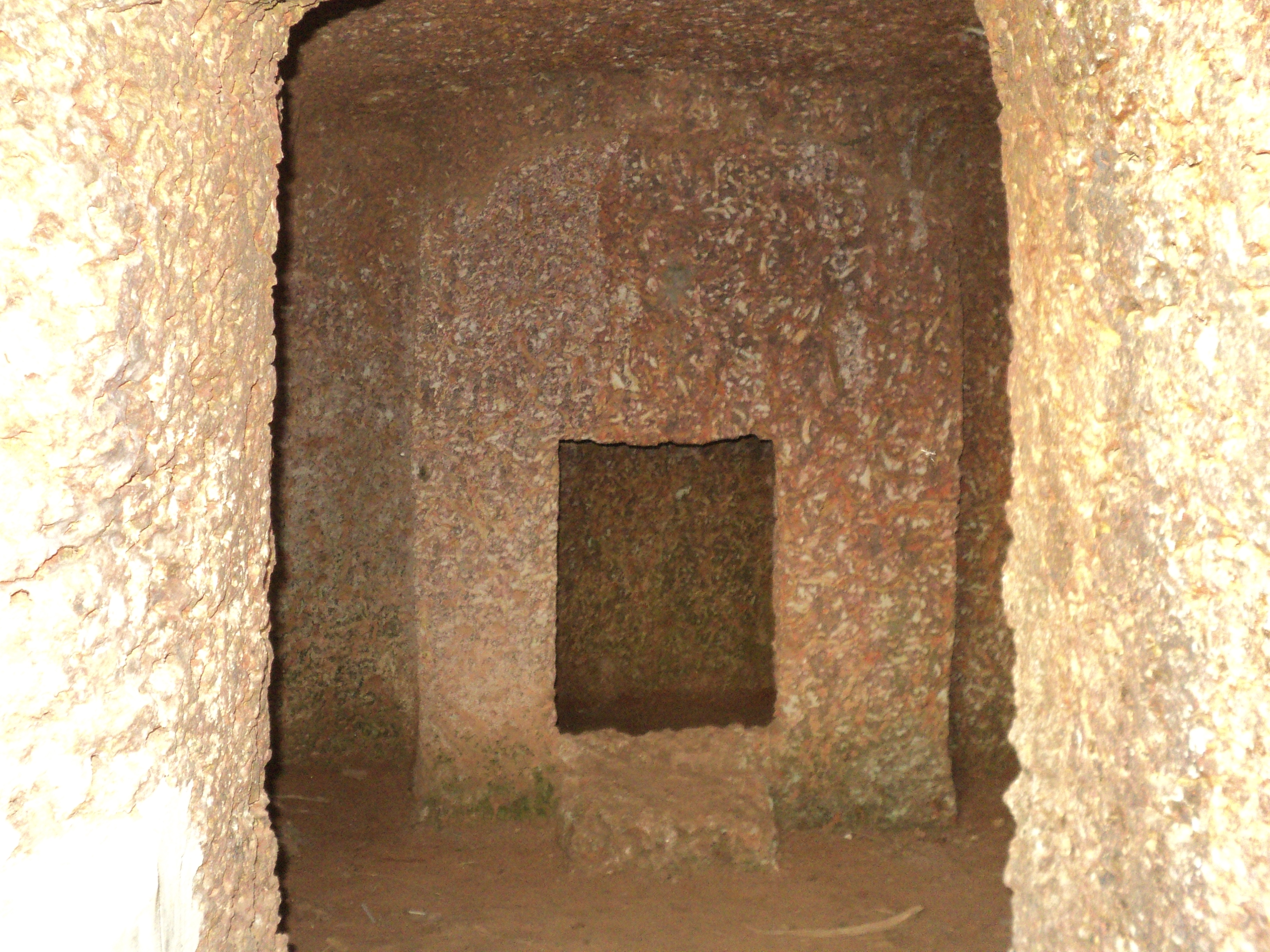
Marunnara – inside view

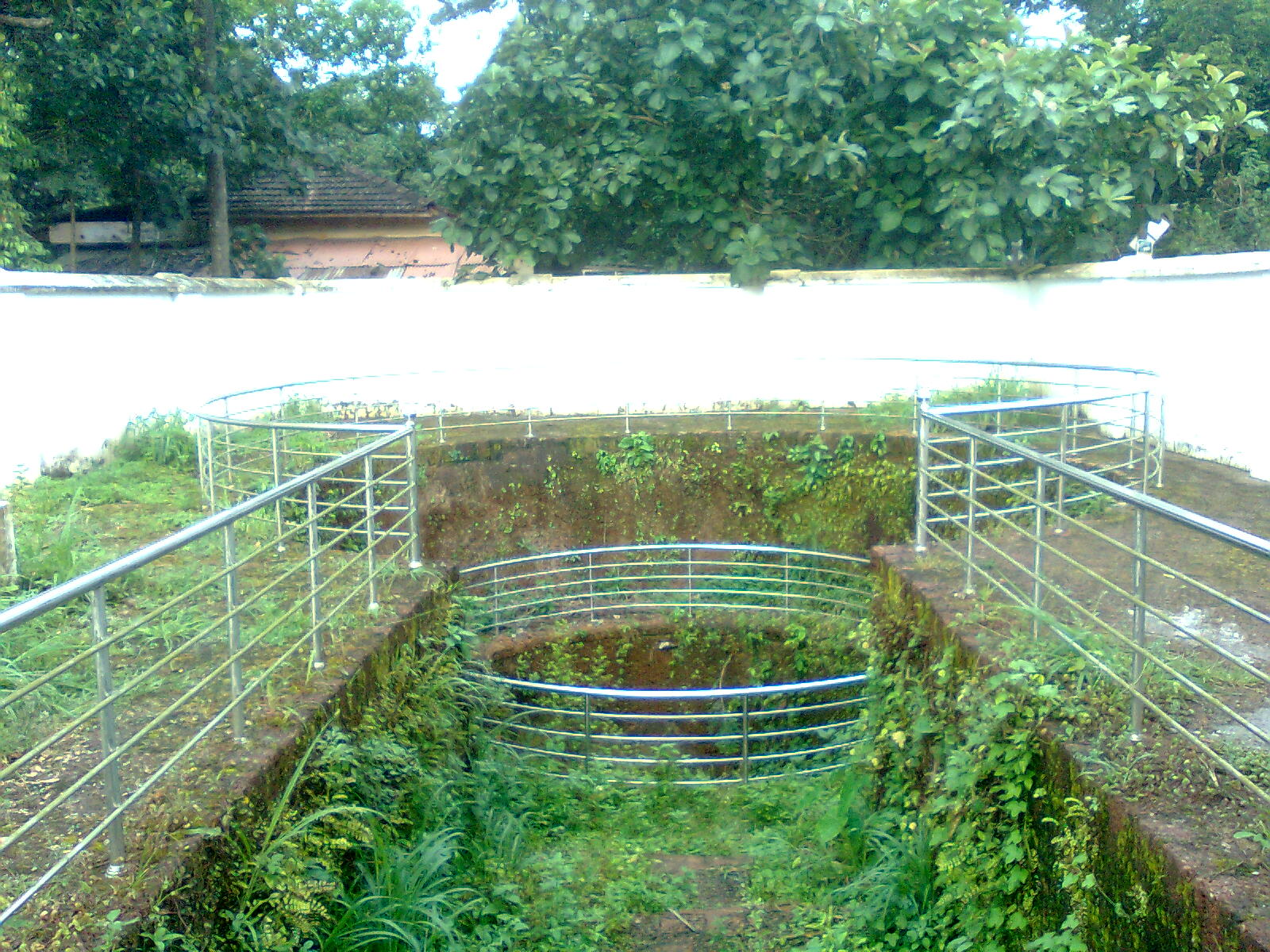
Manikkinar

The archaeological remains and preservation efforts surrounding Mamankam are centered on several historic sites at Tirunavaya in Kerala, which are designated as Protected Monuments by the State Archaeology Department.

=== Key Archaeological Remains ===
Five primary structures associated with the festival have been identified and preserved:

- Nilapadu Thara (Vakayur Platform): This is a raised platform located on the premises of the Kodakkal Tile Factory. Historically, this was the spot where the Samutiri (Zamorin) of Kozhikode would stand during the festival to display his power and face the challenge of the warriors.
- Manikkinar: A large well where the bodies of the fallen Chavers (suicide warriors) from Valluvanad were reportedly thrown, often by elephants, after they were killed during their attempt to assassinate the Samutiri.
- Marunnara: Situated on the Kodakkal-Bandar Road, this stone structure served as an ammunition store or magazine where the Samutiris kept explosives for battles and fireworks for the festival.
- Pazhukkamandapam: This was the designated viewing gallery from which the Samutiri royal family and other dignitaries watched the Mamankam festivities.
- Changampally Kalari: Located near the Thazhathara-Kuttippuram Road, this was a training ground for warriors and also served as a facility for administering medical treatment to those injured in battle.

=== Preservation and Challenges ===
While these sites are legally protected, their preservation faces significant logistical and physical challenges:

- Private Land Issues: Most of these monuments are situated on private land, which limits the ability of the Kerala Tourism Department to intervene directly in their long-term preservation. For instance, the Marunnara sits on land owned by the Kerala State Electricity Board, and the Nilapadu Thara is within the grounds of a private tile factory.
- Renovation Projects: In August 2010, the state government inaugurated a renovation project for the ruins under the Nila Tourism Project. Funded with approximately ₹90 lakhs, this initiative involved the renovation of all five major sites (Kalari, Nilapadu Thara, Manikkinar, Pazhukkamandapam, and Marunnara).
- Current State of Decay: Despite renovation efforts, reports as recent as 2011 suggested that the relics were in a ruined state and "fading to oblivion" due to neglect and a lack of proper promotional strategies for the sites.

== Other fairs in Kerala ==
Many festivals with the name "Mamankam" are conducted in Hindu temples across Kerala. To disambiguate them from the Mamankam conducted at Tirunavaya, they are usually denoted by the name of the place along with the title. For example, 'Machad Mamankam'.

== See also ==
- Tirunavaya
- Thunchan Parambu, Tirur
- Vairankode Vela
