= Putumanna Kandaru Menon =

Hindu warrior

Putumanna Kandaru Menon (1750–1766) was a Chaver who died during the 1766 Mamankam. At the time of his death, he was 16 years old. During the Mamankam, Menon fought through the warriors of Zamorin and reached the "Nilapatuthara" (stage) and swung his sword at the Zamorin. Kandaru Menon's ballads describe the heroic history of Kandaru Menon of Vatonneveet and Ithappu, who went to Tirunnavaya and fought against the soldiers of the Zamorin in the year 1766. Kandaru Menon and Ithappu who reached the stage on the day of Mamankam and reached the stage by bravely fighting many of the Zamorin's army and reached the stage. Unniraman, a soldier of the Zamorin in Madappuram, who saw him approaching the Zamorin, killed Ithapu with a sword. Immediately Kandaru Menon jumped into the crowd and Nambioli, who was standing in front of Cherai Panicker (Chettuvayi), cut down the physicians and collided with Cherai Panicker, a scholar. Cherai Panicker, who has been pitied many times, had a tough fight with Menon. Kandaru Menon's, hand began to grow weak and limp. He slashed at Menon's thigh, causing Kandaru Menon to fall to his knees on the floor. Menon, who was about to fall and die, looked at Panicker's navel and kicked him before dying.

== See also ==
- Nair
- Putumanna Panikkar
- Zamorin
