= Putumanna Panikkar =

Putumanna Panikkar is one of the most prominent Nair families in the Valluvanad area of Kerala, India. The chavers from Valluvanad taking part in the Mamankam festival have always been led by the Putumanna Panikkar family. In 1766, when the last Mamankam was conducted in Thirunavaya, the Zamorin had a hair-breath escape from Putumanna Kandaru Menon, a chaver aged 16 hailing from the Putumanna Panikkar family.

== See also ==
- Panikkar
