= Chirakkal, Kannur =

Chirakkal
- Suburb
- Chirakkal
- Interactive map of Chirakkal
- Coordinates: 11°54′55″N 75°21′43″E
- Country: India
- State: Kerala
- District: Kannur

Government
  - Type: Panchayat raj
  - Body: Chirakkal Panchayat

Area
  - Total: 13.56 km^{2} (5.24 sq mi)

Population (2011)
  - Total: 45,601
  - Density: 3,363/km^{2} (8,710/sq mi)

Languages
  - Official: Malayalam, English
- Time zone: UTC+5:30 (IST)
- PIN: 670011
- ISO 3166 code: IN-KL
- Vehicle registration: KL-13
- Niyama Sabha: Azhikode
- Lok Sabha: Kannur

Chirakkal is a census town in Kannur district in the state of Kerala, India. It is a suburb of Kannur city, located about 6 km (3.7 mi) north of Kannur towards Taliparamba.

== History ==
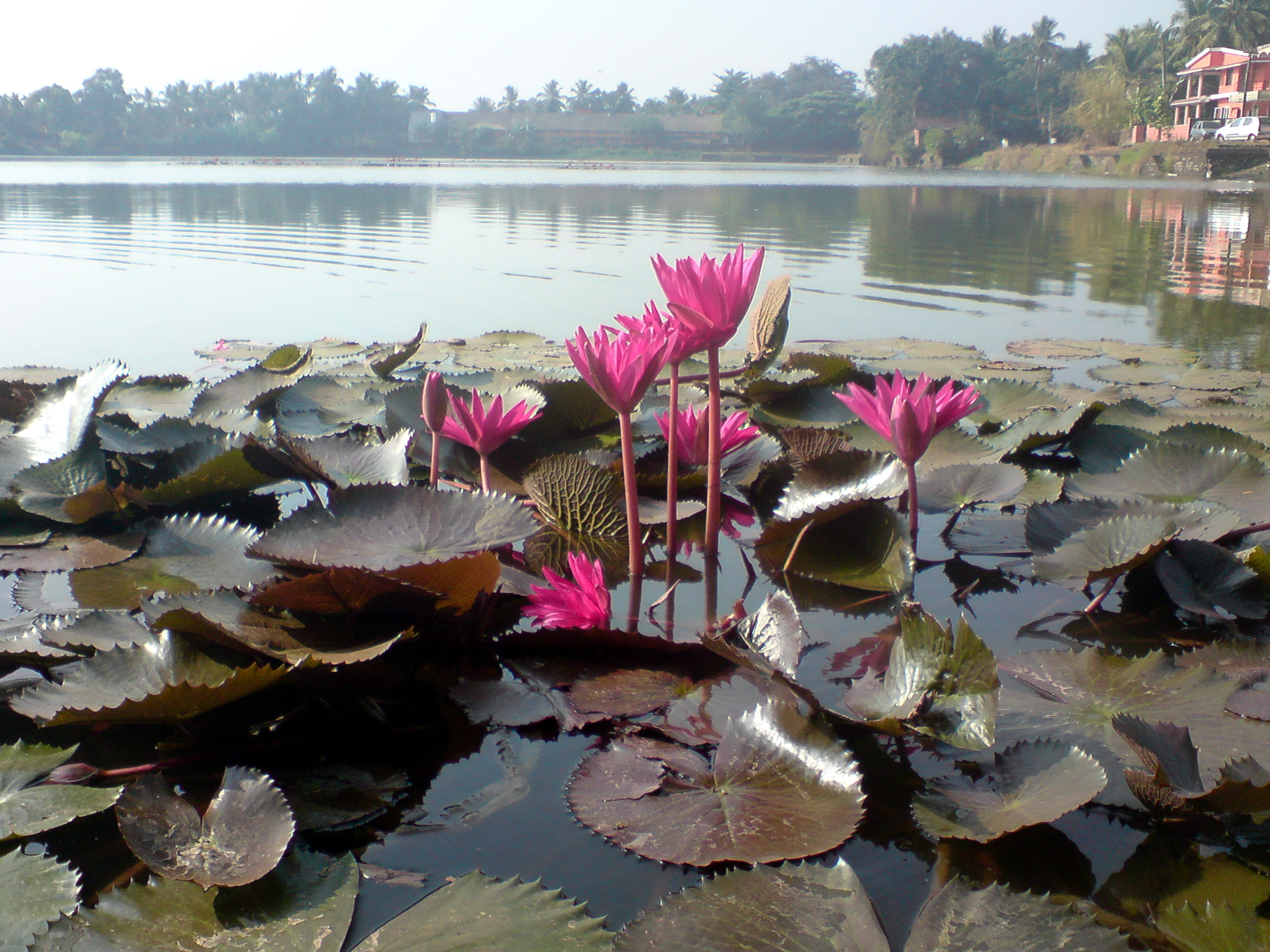
Chirakkal Chira

The Kovilakam ("Palace" in the Malayalam language) of Kolathiris, the erstwhile ruling dynasty is situated in Chirakkal. The Kolathiri of Chirakkal was also known as Chirakkal Raja, meaning the king of Chirakkal. The southern branch of the same family ruled over Venad and is today known as the Travancore royal family.

Kolathiris are the successors of Mooshiks Kings who ruled northern Kerala in the first century AD. The detailed history of this dynasty and hidden history of this region is mentioned in the "Mooshika Vamsham" a Sanskrit poetic text, written by Athulan in the tenth century AD. Mooshika Vamsham is believed to be one of the earliest Sanskrit books written based on the history of northern Kerala.

Kolathiris were political and commercial rivals of the Samoothiris (Zamorins) of Kozhikode.

Bekal Fort now in Kasaragod and Chandragiri Fort were originally under the Chirakkal Rajas until Shivappa Naik's invasion of Kolathunadu. Nowadays the recognition of the Chirakkal Raja is widely regarded by the folk artists, especially the Theyyam artists. The most gifted among them receive 'pattum valayum' (a type of silk cloth and golden bangle) from the Chirakkal Raja as recognition.

== Demographics ==
As of 2011 Census, Chirakkal census town with an area of 13.48 km^{2} (5.20 sq mi) had a population of 45,601, where male population is 21,123 and female population is 24,478. Population of Children under the age of 0-6 is 4902, male child population under the age of six is 2412 and female child population under the age of six is 2490.

Total literacy rate of Chirakkal is 96.05%, male literacy rate is 97.57% and female literacy rate is 94.77%. In Chirakkal, Female Sex Ratio is 1159 per 1000 Males. Child sex ratio is 1032 per 1000 male child under the age of six. Total number of house holds in Chirakkal is 9599.

== Famous residents ==
Former Chief Minister of Kerala Shri K. Karunakaran was born in Chirakkal in 1918.

== Image gallery ==
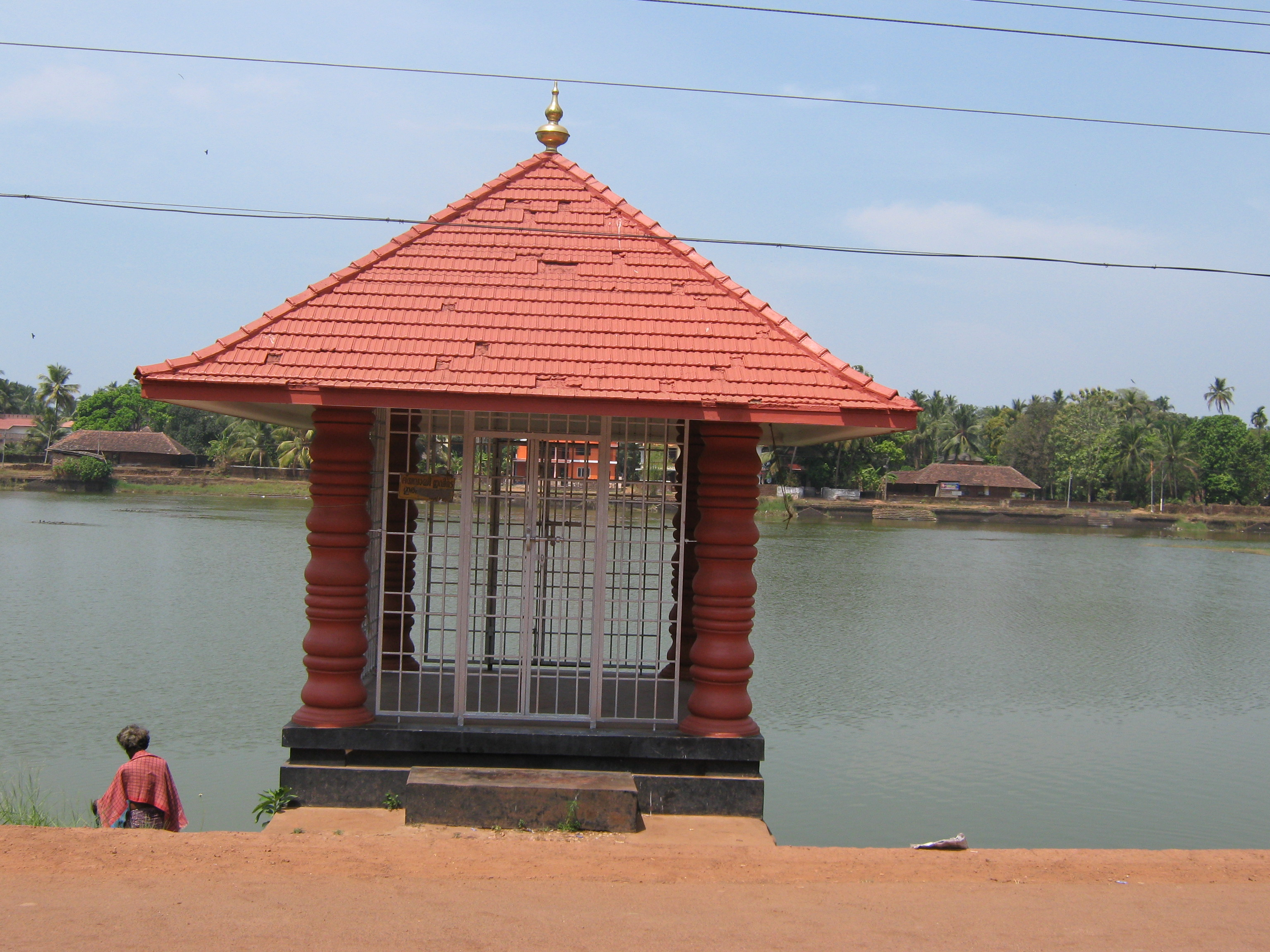
Chirakkal Chira

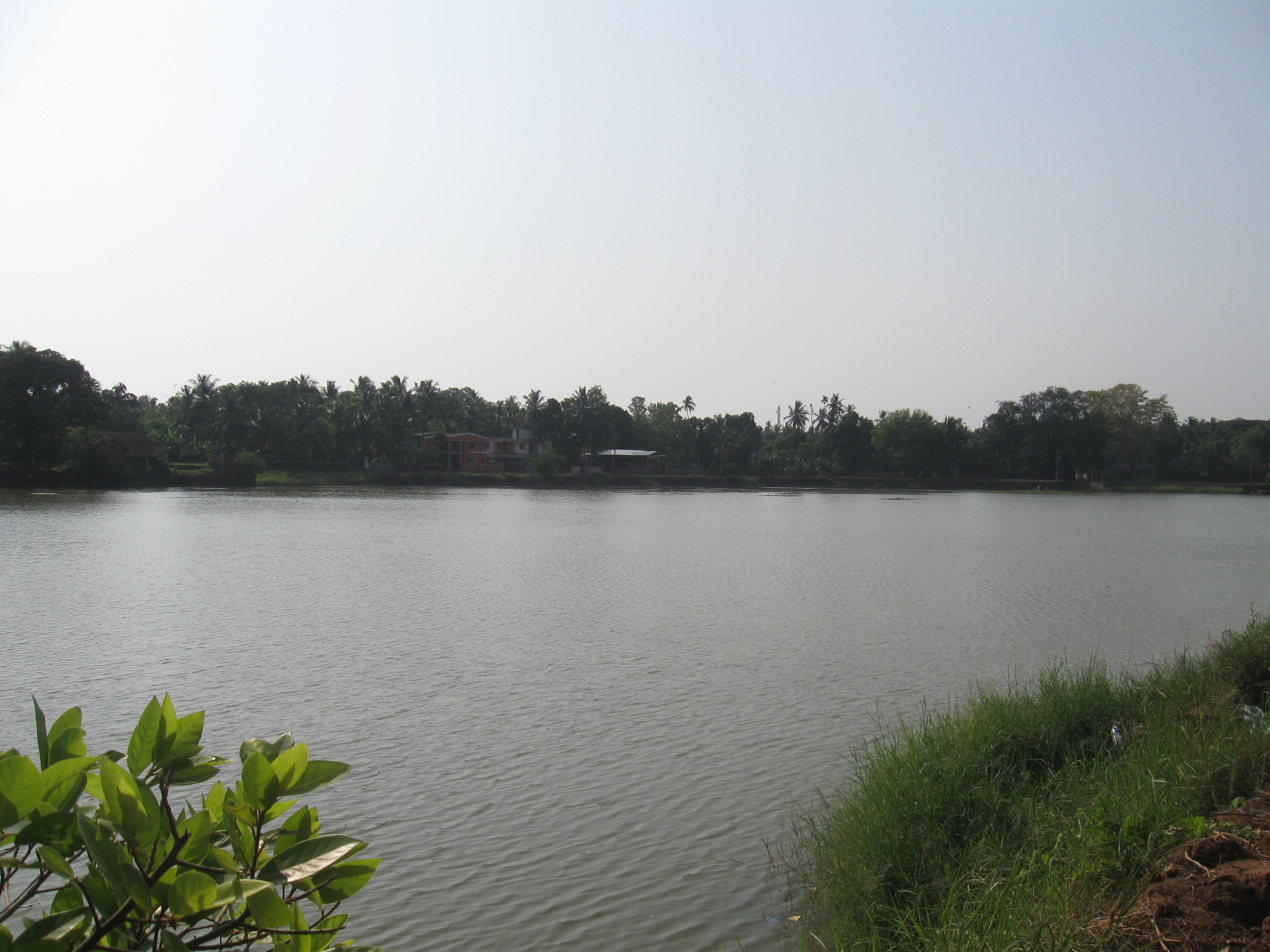
Chirakkal Chira

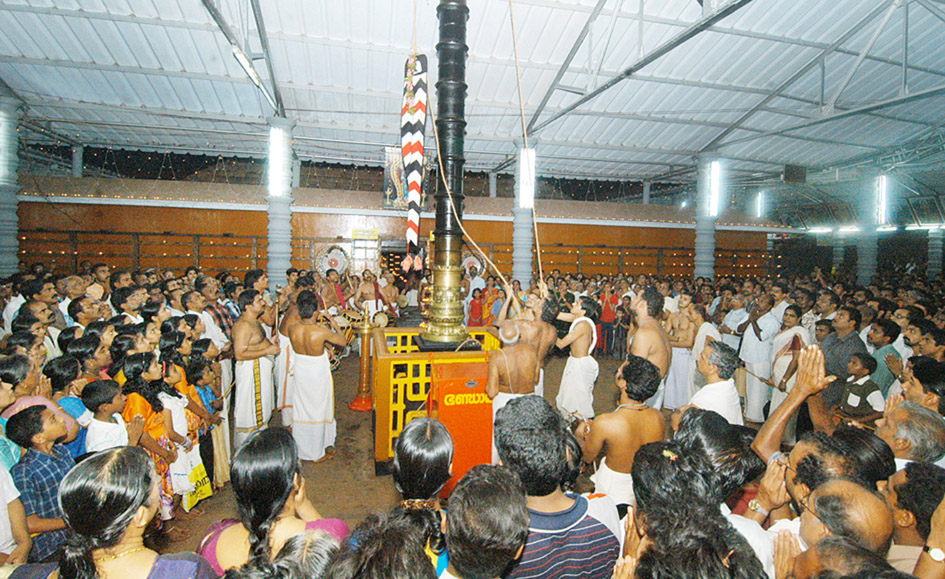
Kodiyettam at Kadalayi

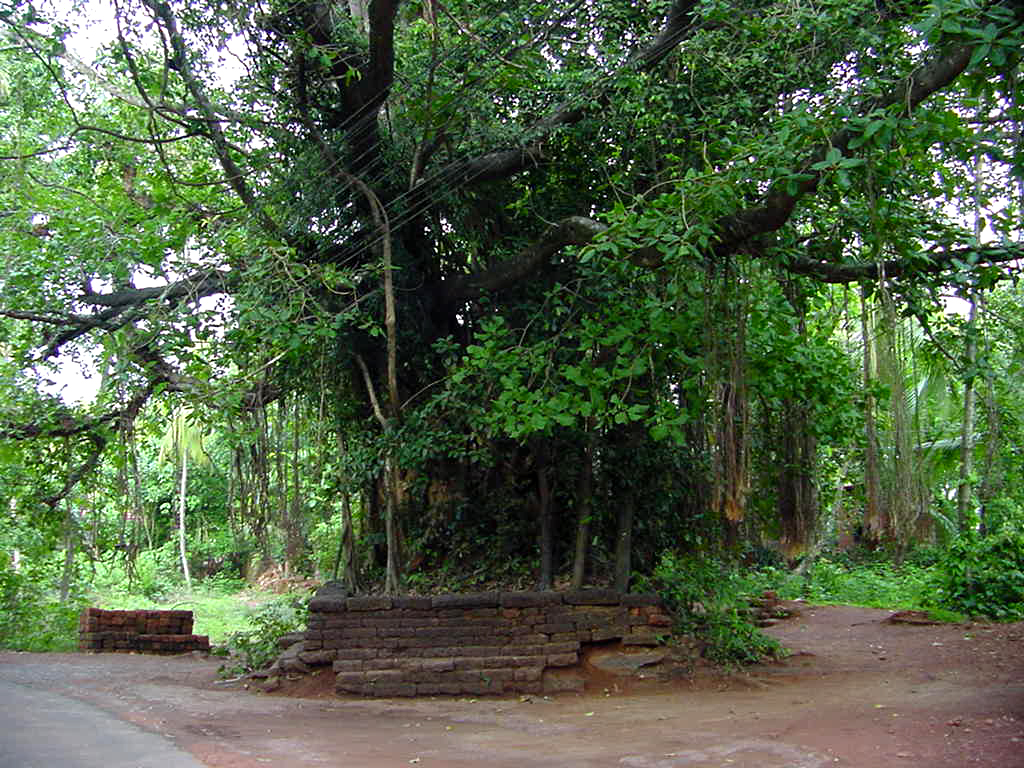
Kanhirathara

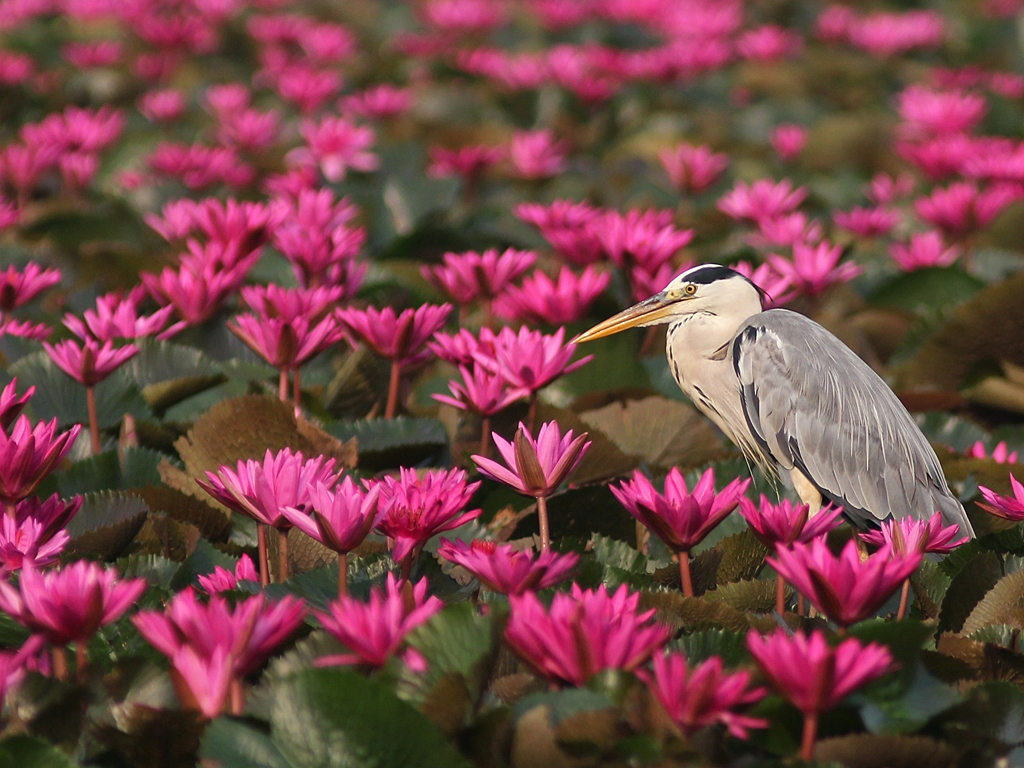
A grey heron amongst the water lilies at Chirakkal chira

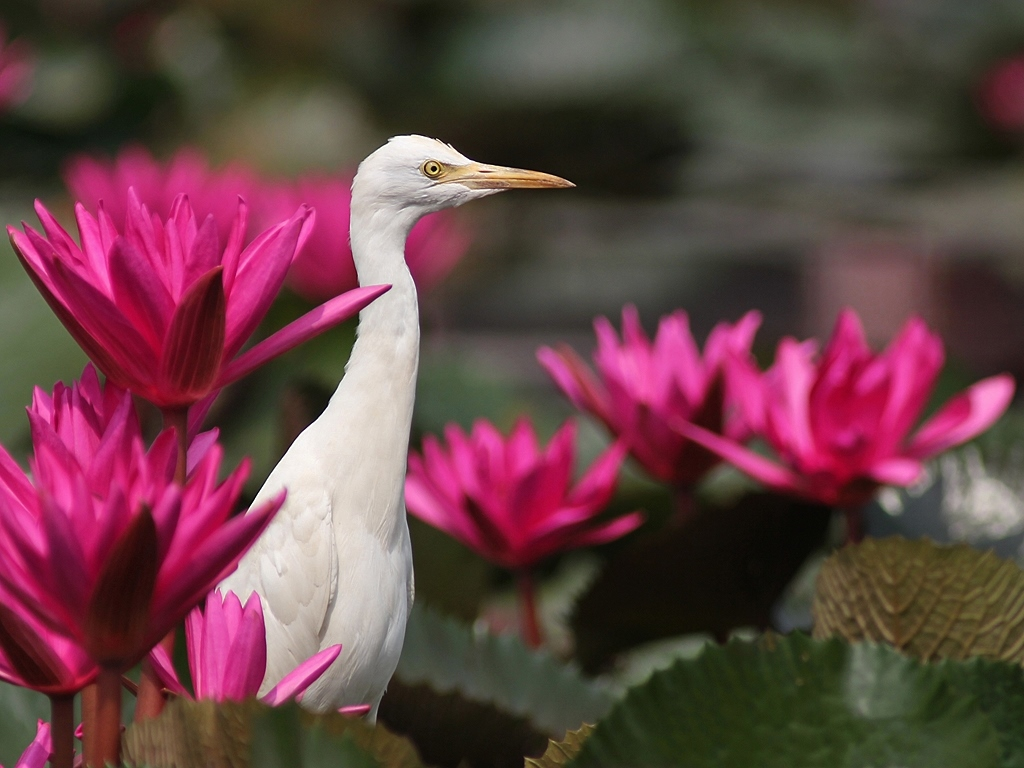
A cattle egret at the Chirakkal chira

== See also ==
- Chirakkal Raja
- Urumi
- Kolathiri
