= Mysorean invasion of Malabar =

1766–1792 part of the Anglo-Mysore Wars

- Part of the Anglo-Mysore Wars
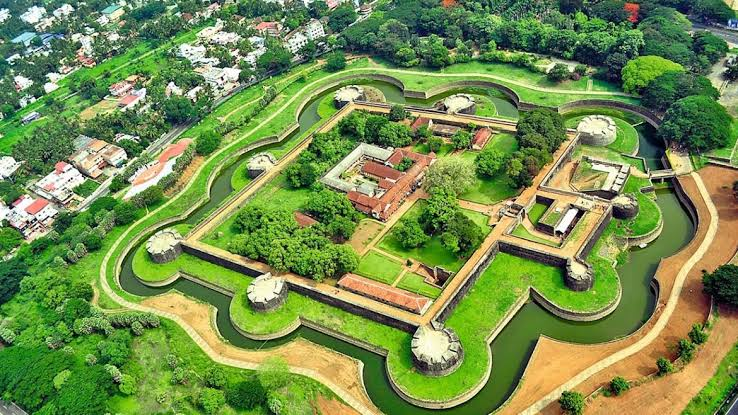
- Aerial view of Palakkad Fort, Malabar
Date	1766–18 March 1792
Location	South India
Result	East India Company victory
Territorial changes	East India company annexes the Malabar Coast

Belligerents
Sultanate of Mysore; Arakkal Kingdom; Supported by: (Louis XIV's East India Company) French Indies Company	(Travancore) Travancore; Zamorin of Calicut; Kingdom of Kottayam; Supported by: East India Company

The Mysorean invasion of Malabar (1766–1792) was the military invasion of the Malabar region of Kerala, including the territories of the Zamorin of Calicut, by the then-de facto ruler of the Kingdom of Mysore, Hyder Ali. After the invasion, the Kingdom of Cochin to the south of Malabar became a tributary state of Mysore.

The invasion of Malabar was motivated by a desire for access to the ports bordering the Indian Ocean. The Mysore invasion gave the East India Company the opportunity to tighten their grip on the ancient feudal principalities of Malabar and convert Travancore into only a protected ally.

By the late 18th century, the small kingdoms had been absorbed or subordinated by three large states: Travancore, Calicut (ruled by Zamorins), and the Kingdom of Cochin.

The Kingdom of Mysore, ruled nominally by the Wodeyar family, rose to prominence in India after the decline of the Vijayanagara Empire and again after the Mughal Empire. In 1761, Ali took control of Mysore by overthrowing the then-prime minister of Mysore, and became its de facto head. He made the Mysorean king Krishnaraja Wodeyar II a prisoner in his own palace. He turned his attention towards expansion, which included the capture of the Kingdoms of Bednur (Ikkeri or Keladi), Sunda, Sera, and Canara. In 1766, he descended into Malabar and occupied the Kingdoms of Chirakkal (former Kolathunad), Kottayam, Kadathanad, Calicut, Valluvanad and Palghat. The king of Cochin accepted his suzerainty and paid him tribute annually from 1766 to 1790. Faruqabad, near Calicut, was the local capital of the Mysorean-ruled area.

Ali's 1767 attempt to defeat Travancore failed; a second effort by his son Tipu Sultan in 1789–1790 triggered the Third Anglo-Mysore War. Only Travancore stood outside the Muslim Mysore authority in the area.

In the Treaty of Seringapatam (1792), Tipu ceded half of his territories, including Malabar, to the East India Company and their allies, and paid 3.3 crores (33 million) rupees as indemnity. By 1801, Richard Wellesley created the Madras Presidency by attaching Malabar and the Carnatic territories seized from Mysore. The Company asked Travancore to pay all the expenses of the Third Anglo-Mysore war on the rationale that the war was undertaken in its defence. The treaty of 1795 reduced the status of Travancore from friend and ally of the East India Company to protected ally. The king was forced to entertain a subsidiary force far beyond his capacity to subsidise. The Company also claimed a monopoly on the country's black pepper trade.

== Background ==
The Keladi Nayakas invaded the Kolathunadu Kingdom of northern Malabar in 1732 to recover their lost territories. Under the command of Gopalaji, 30,000 Canara soldiers easily overran prince Kunhi Ambu's (Cunhi Homo) forts in northern Kolathunad. In 1732, Mysorean forces invaded the dominions of Zamorin at the invitation of the ruler of Palakkad. Zamorin moved his army towards the border of his dominion and repelled the invasion.

The Nayaks of Keladi planned another attack on Kolathunad in 1737. Ambu agreed to sign a peace treaty with the Nayakas, which fixed the northern border of Kolathunad on the Madayi. The British factors of Tellicherry also signed their own treaty with the Keladi Nayakas, which guaranteed the integrity of British trading concessions in Malabar in the event of future conflicts between the Canara and Kolathunad. In 1737, more border conflicts broke out between the Zamorin and Mysore. In 1745, three battles were fought between them, but the fighting appears to have been inconclusive.

Hyder Ali first marched to the area in 1757 as requested by the king of Palakkad, a long-time military foe of the Zamorin of Calicut. At that time, the Zamorin were fighting with the raja of Cochin. Hyder, who at that time was the faujdar of Dindigul under the Kingdom of Mysore, marched into southern Malabar with a force of 2,500 horses and 7,500 men supported by Palghat troops. His army defeated the Calicut army and reached the Arabian Sea. His main intention was to capture the vast treasuries of the rulers of Malabar. The Malabar Coast had been famous for its foreign spice trade since ancient times. Zamorin reached a treaty with Hyder, in which he was required to pay twelve lakh rupees as war reparations. However, the Zamorin technically deceived Ali after the Mysore Army returned from Malabar.

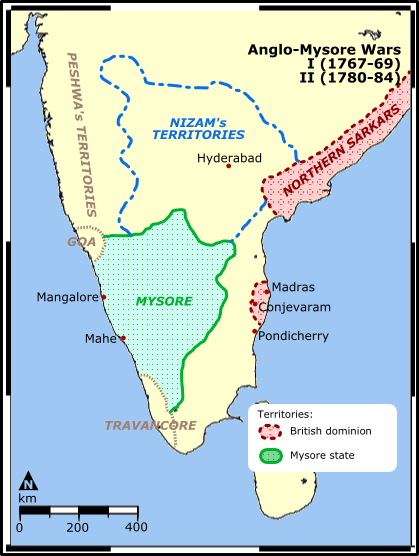
Map showing Malabar and Cochin under Mysore

== Occupation of Malabar ==
When news of Ali's conquest of Bednur reached Ali Rajah of Cannanore in 1763, he promptly asked Ali to invade Kerala and help him deal with the Zamorin of Calicut. The Muslim chieftain of Cannanore, an old rival of the neighbouring powerful Kolathiri, was an active ally of Mysore under the occupation.

Ali Raja seized and set fire to the palace of Kolathiri Raja. The latter escaped with his followers to the then-British settlement at Tellicherry. After the victory, Ali entered the Kingdom of Kottayam in present-day North Malabar and occupied it, with assistance from native Muslims, after some resistance by the Kottayam army.

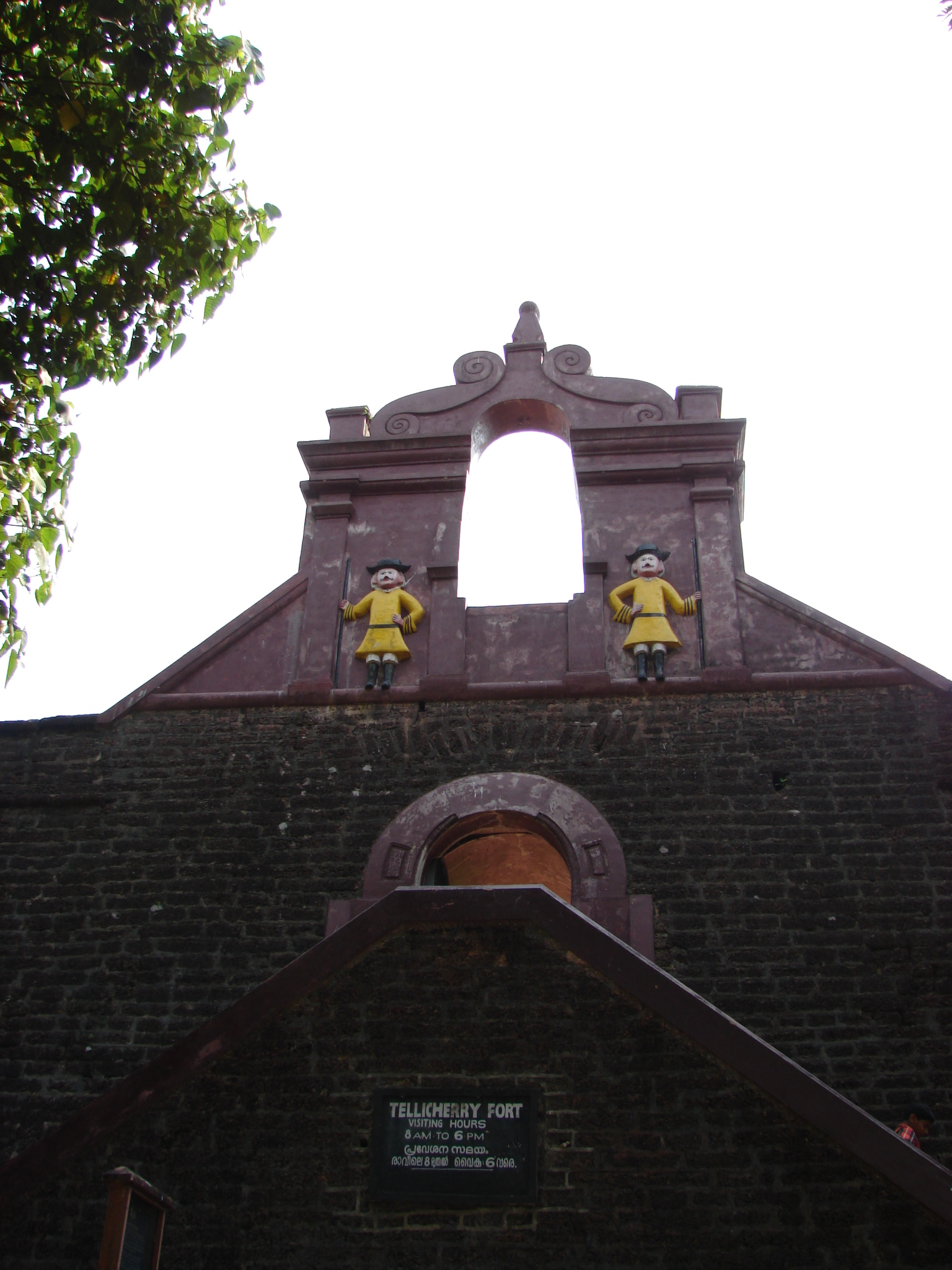
Thalassery fort, Thalassery

After taking Calicut in a bloody battle, Ali, with a large amount of money, marched south-east towards Coimbatore through Palghat. Mysore appointed Raja as military governor and Madanna (a former revenue officer) as civil governor of the newly acquired province of Malabar.

== Mysorean rule (1766–1773) ==
Shortly afterwards, Raza Ali, Hyder's lieutenant, returned to Coimbatore, and Hindu fighters hidden in the forests rebelled against the Mysorean authorities. They re-occupied forts and large portions of land during the monsoon season. However, by June 1766, Hyder returned to Malabar and sent his troops on the rebels, killing many Nair soldiers and deporting over 15,000 Nairs to Kanara.

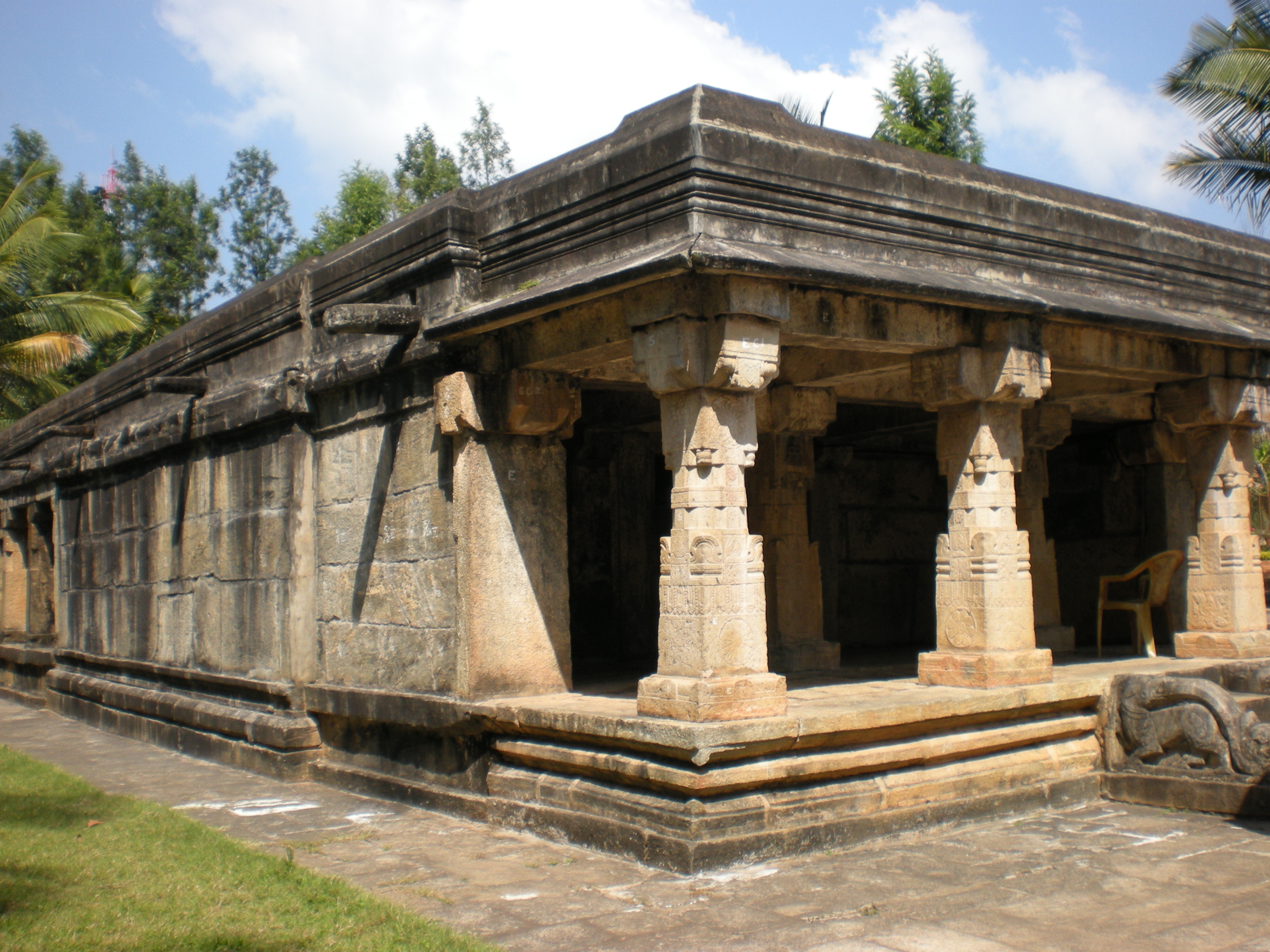
Sultan Bathery derives its present name from Tipu Sultan of Mysore who used the Jain temple there as his battery (hence the name Sultan's Battery)

Mysore's response was harsh after it put down the rebellion. Many Hindu fighters were executed, and thousands of others were forcibly relocated to the Mysore highlands. To prevent another armed uprising, Hyder Ali suggested anti-Nair laws to the district, and levied additional taxes as punishment against rebellious Nair chiefs.

Eralppad, second-line successor to the throne at Calicut, continued his attacks against the Mysorean forces from southern Malabar. Eventually, faced by continuous instability and rebellions, Hyder agreed to cede many parts of Malabar to local Hindu rulers (as age-old customs existed in Malabar) as tributary states under the Kingdom of Mysore.

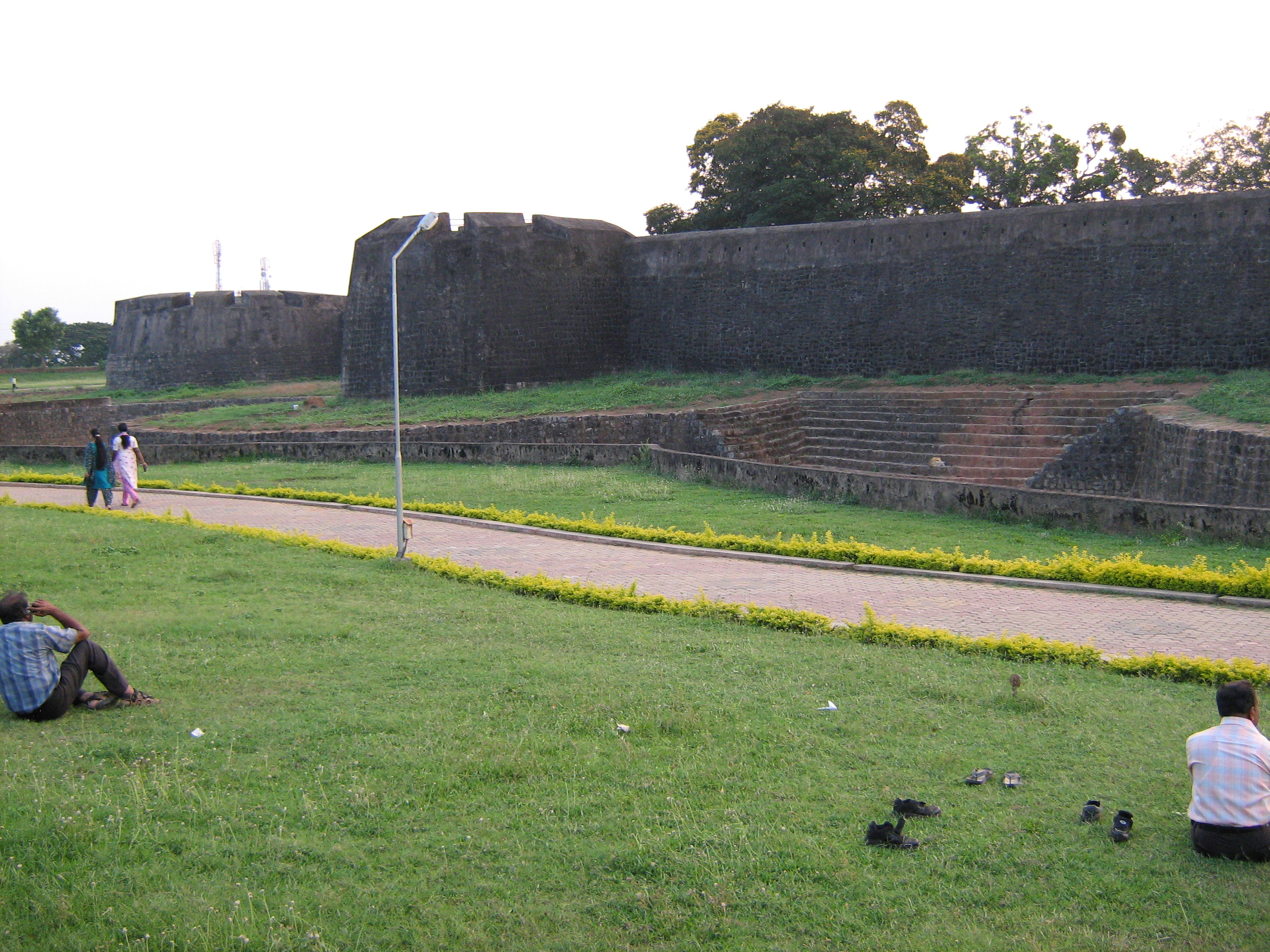
Palakkad Fort

In 1767, the whole of Malabar revolted again. Mysore's army of 4,000 men were defeated by 2,000 Kottayam Nairs in Northern Malabar. Mysorean garrisons were trapped by Nair rebels, who seized the countryside and ambushed Mysorean convoys and communications.

The Mysorean army temporarily retreated from Malabar in 1768, stopped the uprisings, and built Palakkad Fort.

In 1773, Mysore forces under Said Saheb marched to Malabar through the Thamarassery Pass, since the Hindu rulers had broken the earlier treaties on paying tributes.

== Cochin accepts Mysore's suzerainty ==
Mysore conducted a second military operation in 1774, concentrating on the extremely ancient and unsurpassed treasures of the Main Temple in the city of Thiruvananthapuram in Travancore. Travancore had also given refuge to political enemies of Mysore from Malabar. Hyder moved southwards with a huge army and negotiated with the Dutch for free passage to Travancore through Dutch territories, which they refused; the Dutch owed Travancore after their defeat in the Battle of Colachel. Travancore refused to stop building the Nedumkotta fortification, which formed the northern defences of Travancore, and rumours of a proposed invasion of Travancore started circulating.

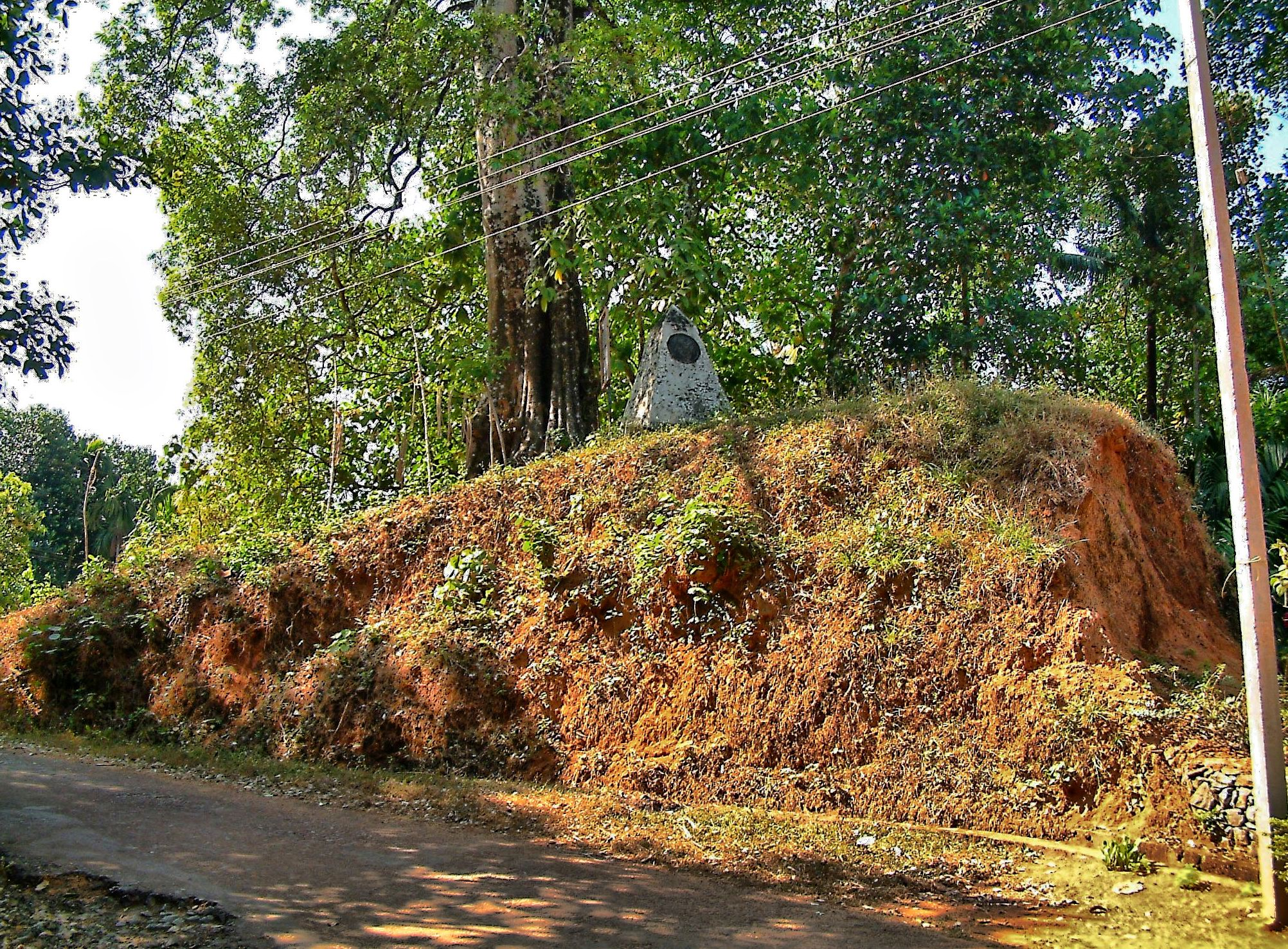
The relics of the entrance of Travancore lines

Hyder asked the rulers of Cochin and Travancore to pay tribute as vassal states. Cochin was asked to pay a total of Rs. 400,000 and ten elephants, while Travancore was asked to pay Rs. 1,500,000 and thirty elephants. Cochin royals agreed to pay, and accepted Mysore's superiority. Malabar and Cochin came under Mysore rule, opening the Malabar Coast to the kings of Mysore. However the King of Travancore, under the protection of the East India Company, refused to pay the tribute.

Eventually, the Mysorean army marched on Travancore from the north. The Dutch military garrison at Cranganore Fort tried to stop it. Hyder asked his commander, Sardar Khan, to take an army of 10,000 to the Cochin Kingdom. In August 1776, Cochin was invaded from the north and the fort at Trichur was captured.

After the ruler of Cochin surrendered, Hyder advanced to the Nedumkotta fortifications. By this time Airoor and Chetuva Fort had been ceded to Mysore. Meanwhile, the Dutch, with the help of the Travancore Nair Army, put down an attempt by Mysorean forces to capture Cranganore Fort. The ruler of Cranganore surrendered to Hyder, but the Dutch stormed his palace and captured it in January 1778.

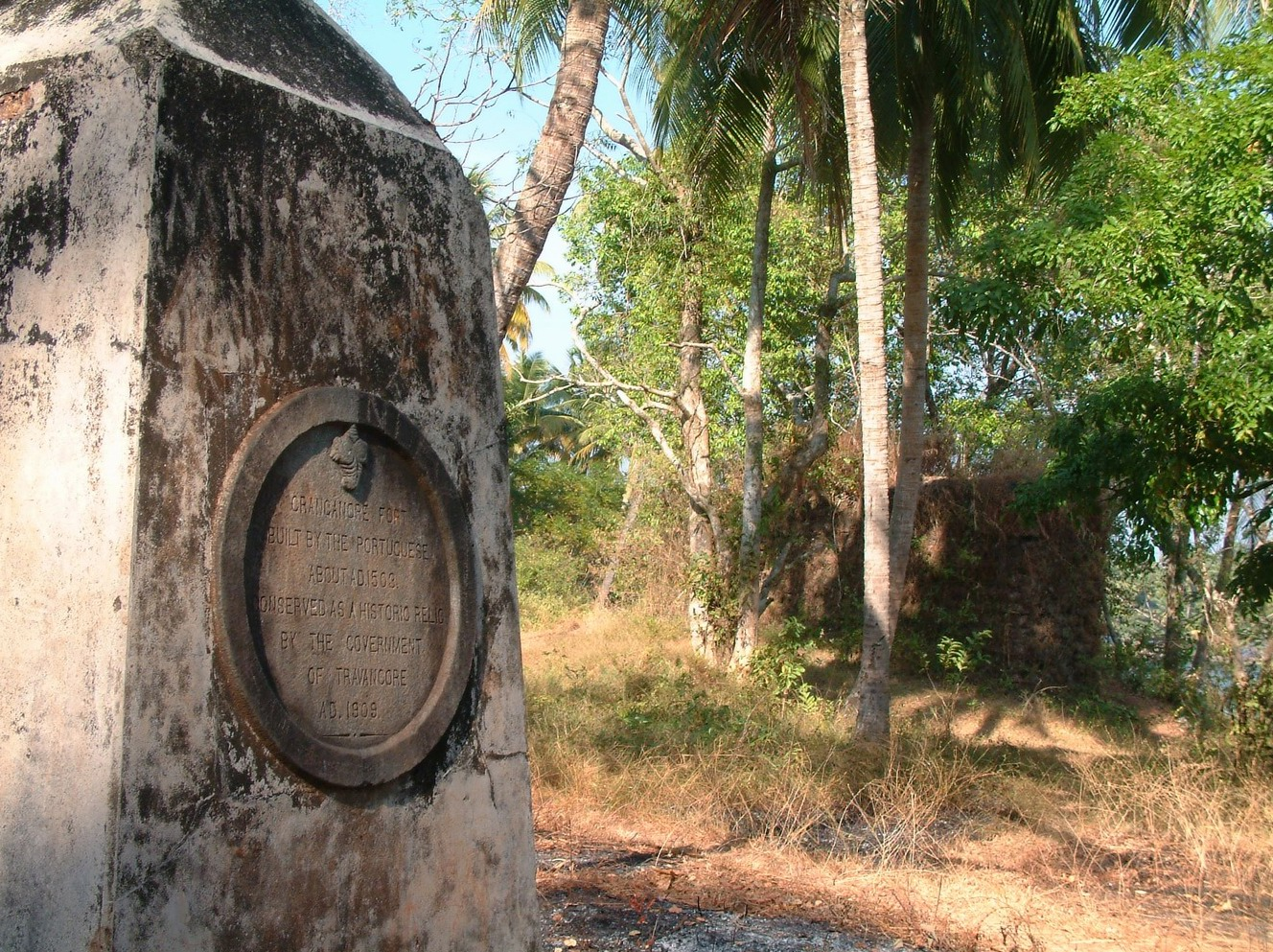
Remains of Cranganore Fort

Afterwards, Hyder's forces engaged in small-scale attacks and ambushes throughout Malabar, on Travancore, British, and Dutch forces, as well as on Nair mutineers in northern Malabar. By 1778, Mysore had allied with the French, who were at war with the British Empire. That year, the British captured Mahé and Pondicherry. The newly appointed king of Kolathunad supported Mysore, providing crucial supplies for the war, and by March, Kolathiri had occupied Randattara. Soon, Hyder removed the kings of Kadathanad and Kottayam who had supplied the British in their campaigns. After facing losses in Calicut, Palghat and Tirunelvely, Hyder retreated to Mysore to plan another attack on Travancore.

== Second Anglo-Mysore War ==
The East India Company captured the French controlled port at Mahé in 1779. Mahé was of great strategic importance to Hyder, who received French-supplied arms and munitions there, and Hyder not only explicitly told the British it was under his protection, he also provided troops for its defence. On 2 July 1780, Hyder declared war on the East India Company, signalling the start of what was later called the Second Anglo-Mysore War (1779–1784). By February 1782, Dharpattom, Nitore, Calicut, and Palakkad Fort surrendered to the British forces under Major Abington. Sardar Ali Khan died later.

During the summer of 1782, East India Company officials in Bombay sent additional troops to Tellicherry, where they continued operations against Mysorean holdings in the Malabar. Hyder sent Tipu and a strong force to counter them, and pinned the force at Ponnani.

Tired of continuous setbacks, Hyder sent an army unit under Makhdoom Ali to Malabar to restrain anti-Mysore activities in the south. Meanwhile, Major Abington and Colonel Thomas Mackenzie Humberston, who were in Calicut, were ordered to prevent the advance of Makhdoom's army from the south. In the ensuing battle in Tiroorangadi, more than 400 Mysore soldiers, including Makhdoom, were killed. Colonel Humberston chased the Mysorean army to Ponnani, with the principal aim of capturing Palakkad Fort. Due to a thundering torrential storm, he retreated to Calicut then moved his unit up to Trithala near Mankeri Fort, but finally retreated to Ponnani, fearing a surprise attack in the extreme weather conditions. Major Norman Macleod reached Ponnani before taking over the command of British forces on the Malabar Coast.

When Tipu learned of Hyder's sudden death to cancer, his departure from the battlefield provided some relief to the British force, but Bombay officials sent further reinforcements under General Matthews to Ponnani.

The British captured Mangalore in March 1783, but Tipu, now the ruler of Mysore, recaptured Bednorem before besieging and recapturing Mangalore. At the same time, near Tanjore, Major General James Stuart's army joined Colonel William Fullarton's, before the latter marched along the Dindigul-Dharapuram-Palakkad route and besieged Palakkad Fort. Captain Midland and Sir Thomas under Fullarton captured Palakkad Fort on 14 November 1783. Company officials, having received orders from London to bring an end to the war, entered negotiations with Tipu. Pursuant to a preliminary ceasefire, Fullarton was ordered to abandon all of his recent conquests. However, due to allegations that Tipu had violated terms of the ceasefire at Mangalore, Fullarton remained at Palakkad Fort. During this time, a prince from the Zamorin dynasty emerged and the British retreated, conferring the fort on the prince, but Tipu's forces marched to Palakkad Fort and occupied it and southern Malabar.

In December 1783, General Macleod, with fresh support from the French, captured Cannanore from the Arakkal, who were allies of Mysore in Malabar. This was followed by Arakkal Beevi's failed negotiation attempt with the British.

The war ended on 11 March 1784 with the Treaty of Mangalore. Both sides agreed to restore the others' lands to the status quo ante bellum. With the treaty, the British and the Nair kings controlled the entire northern Malabar, Mysore ruled southern Malabar, and Macleod was forced to fall back from Cannanore.

== Between the wars (1784–1789) ==
After the Second Anglo-Mysore War, the Mysore ruled Malabar despite many uprisings by the local Hindu population against the new land taxes. To put an end to the land problems, Tipu appointed Arshad Beg Khan as the civil governor of Malabar. Khan soon retired from service and advised Tipu to visit the region himself. In 1788, Tipu paid an official visit to Malabar and talked with the Resident Gribble about the construction of a new city near Beypore.

In 1787, the Mysore captured Iruvazhinadu by murdering Kurungothu Nair, the ruler of Iruvazhinadu, and an old ally of the French.

== Attacks on Travancore (1789–1790) ==
Tipu decided to tighten his grip on his possessions in Malabar and occupy Travancore, as he saw the control of ports and access to the routes to them as highly strategic. Travancore had been Tipu's target since the end of the Second Anglo-Mysore War. Indirect attempts to take over the kingdom had failed in 1788, and Archibald Campbell, the president of Madras at the time, warned Tipu that an attack on Travancore would be treated as a declaration of war on the Company. Tipu received an invitation to intervene from the ruler of Cannanore, and the Mysore forces arrived in Malabar. Initially Tipu tried to subdue Travancore tactically with the help of the Kingdom of Cochin, but the king of Cochin refused and allied with Travancore.

In 1789, Tipu sent forces to Malabar to subdue a rebellion. Many rebels found political asylum in Travancore and Cochin in the wake of his advance.

In late 1789, Tipu began to gather troops at Coimbatore in preparation for an assault on the Nedumkotta, the fortified line of defence built by Dharma Raja of Travancore to pursue the 1789 rebels.

The onset of monsoons prevented Tipu from moving further. Tipu got information that the East India Company was planning to attack his capital and retreated to defend it.

== British take the Malabar ==
In late 1790, British forces took control of the Malabar Coast. A force under Colonel James Hartley gained a decisive victory in the Battle of Calicut in December, while a second under General Robert Abercromby routed the Mysore at Cannanore a few days later.

=== Capture of Cannanore ===
British East India Company forces led by Abercromby, began besieging Cannanore, held by troops of Mysore and of the Ali Raja on 14 December. After he gained control of the high ground commanding the city's main fort, the defenders surrendered. The British victory, along with the taking of Calicut by a separate force a few days earlier, secured their control over the Malabar Coast.

== End of Mysore rule ==
By the Treaty of Seringapatam signed in 1792, Malabar was ceded to the East India Company. It resulted in a sharp curtailment of Mysore's borders to the advantage of the Mahrattas, the Nizam of Hyderabad, and the Madras Presidency. The districts of Malabar, Salem, Bellary, and Anantapur were ceded to the Madras presidency.

== Changes in Malabar ==
The sultans of Mysore changed the ancient landlord system in Malabar just like in Kingdom of Cochin and Travancore. To control the region, Tipu adopted strong measures against Nair nobles of Malabar and established a centralised administrative system. The changes in Malabar due to the Mysore invasions were as follows:

- Tipu introduced monopolies over products like pepper, coconut, tobacco, sandalwood, teak etc.
- The roads developed by Tipu for military purposes helped the development of trade.

=== Ethnic cleansing ===
According to M. Gangadharan, there is evidence that many Hindus were forcefully converted into Islam. In one of the most widely documented cases, the army invaded Kadathanadu and forcibly converted the Nair soldiers who had held out for many weeks against the well-equipped Mysore army without adequate weapons or food. There was also the destruction of Syriac Christian churches and seminaries. According to Paulinus of St. Bartholomew, Christians and Hindus were tied to the feet of elephants and dragged. Tipu sometimes forced Christian and Hindu women to marry Muslim men.

he was also said to have carried away from the province of Malabar 700000 Christians and to have made Muhammedans of 100,000 Hindus

— Memoirs of Tippoo Sultan

Hermann Gundert said in Kerala Pazhama that it is not possible to describe the cruel atrocities perpetrated by Tipu in Kozhikode during the autumn 1789. Elankulam Kunjan Pillai has recorded the situation in Malabar.

==== Captivity of Nairs ====
In 1788, a small army of 2,000 Nairs of Kadathanadu resisted from a fortress in Kuttipuram for a few weeks, but they were weakened by starvation and death. Tipu entered the fort and offered to spare their lives, provided they accepted conversion to Islam. A prince of the Chirakkal royal family in North Malabar was captured and killed in after a chase of few days.

==== Concealment of the Hindu idol at Guruvayur ====
Tipu invaded the Zamorin of Calicut's province again in 1789. Aware of the risk to the idol, it was hidden underground and the Utsava murti was taken to Ambalappuzha Sri Krishna Temple by Mallisseri Namboodiri and Kakkad Othikkan. Tipu destroyed the smaller shrines and set fire to the temple, but it was saved due to timely rain. Tipu lost to the Zamorin, Travancore and the British in 1792. Although the hidden idol and the Utsava murti were re-installed on 17 September 1792, the daily poojas and routines were disrupted.

== See also ==
- Anglo-Mysore Wars
- Pazhassi Raja
- Siege of Tellicherry
- Mysore's campaigns against the states of Malabar (1757)
