= Cereal Killer =

Cereal Killer may refer to:

== Music ==
- The Cereal Killers, a 1993 stage musical by D'Arcy Drollinger

=== Albums ===
- Cereal Killer (video), a 1992 video album by Green Jellö
  - Cereal Killer Soundtrack, a 1993 album by Green Jelly, for their 1992 video album
  - "Cereal Killer", the title track of the above
- Cereal Killers, a 1991 album by Too Much Joy

=== Songs ===
- "Cereal Killer", a 1993 song by Geto Boys off the album Till Death Do Us Part (Geto Boys album)
- "Cereal Killer", a song by Quincy Punx; see the 1995 album Punk Sucks
- "Cereal Killer", a 1998 song by Tobin Sprout off the album Wax Nails
- "Cereal Killer", a 2009 song by Method Man & Redman from the album Blackout! (Method Man & Redman album)

== Film and television ==
- "The Cereal Killer", a 1987 episode of the television series The Oldest Rookie
- "Cereal Killer", a 2005 episode of Forensic Files (season 10) television series
- "Cereal Killer", a 2006 episode of The Apprentice (American season 5) television series
- "Cereal Killer", a 2006 segment of Robot Chicken (season 2) television series
- "Cereal Killer", a 2013 segment of Cartoon Planet; see List of Cartoon Planet episodes
- "Cereal Killer", a 2013 episode of the television series The High Fructose Adventures of Annoying Orange; see List of The High Fructose Adventures of Annoying Orange episodes
- "Cereal Killer", a 2015 episode of the television series Battle Creek (TV series)
- "Cereal Killer", a movie character from the film Hackers

== Other uses ==
- Cereal Killer Cafe, a former cafe in London
- "Cereal Killer", a flavor of donut from the Campbell, California donut shop Psycho Donuts
- "Cereal Killer", a fictional game from the 2008 TV episode "Dangerous Curves" (The Simpsons) of the U.S. TV show The Simpsons

== See also ==
- Lists of cereal pests and diseases
- Cereal (disambiguation)
- Killer (disambiguation)
- Serial killer (disambiguation)
