= Syrian Church =

Syrian Church may refer to any Christian denomination belonging to the Christianity in Syria, including:

- Syriac Orthodox Church
- Syrian Oriental Orthodox Church - Orthodox denominations in Syria
- Syrian Catholic Church (disambiguation) - Catholic denominations in Syria
- Syrian Protestant Churches - Protestant denominations in Syria

== See also ==
- Syrian (disambiguation)
- Syrian Orthodox Church (disambiguation)
