= Serialization (disambiguation) =

Serialization, in computer science, is the process of saving an object so that it can be re-created.

Serialization is also another name for thread or process synchronization.

Serialization or serialisation may also refer to:

- Mass serialization of goods in manufacturing, distribution and logistics
- Serial (literature), told in contiguous installments in sequential issues of a single periodical publication
- Serializability, in databases and transaction processing
- Seriality, a term used in political science, gender studies, and existentialism
- Serialism, in music
- Serial verb construction, a feature of the grammar of some languages

== See also ==
- Serial (disambiguation)
