= C-Real =

C-Real or C:Real or C Real may refer to:

- C-Real (rapper), Ghanaian rapper
- C:Real (Greek band)
- C-REAL, a South Korean band

== See also ==
- Cereal (disambiguation)
- Serial (disambiguation)
