= Serial Killer (disambiguation) =

A serial killer is typically a person who murders three or more persons over a certain period of time.

Serial killer can also refer to:

== Art, entertainment, and media ==
=== Music ===
- "Serial Killer" (song), an unreleased song recorded by American singer and songwriter Lana Del Rey
- "Serial Killers" (song), a 2022 song by Gucci Mane
- Serial Killers, Vol. 1 (album), 2013 album by 'Serial Killers'
- Serial Killers (musical group), a musical trio composed of B-Real, Xzibit, and Demrick

=== Other art, entertainment, and media ===
- Serial killer memorabilia, also referred to as "murderabilia", a term identifying collectibles related to murders, murderers or other violent crimes
- Serial Killers: The Method and Madness of Monsters, a non-fiction true crime history book by Peter Vronsky
- Serial Killers: Richard Ramirez The Night-Time Stalker, a non-fiction true crime book about serial killer Richard Ramirez
- Serial Killers Ink, a website dedicated to selling "murderabilia"
- SK1 (film), released in the United States as Serial Killer 1, a 2014 French thriller drama film directed by Frédéric Tellier
- Serial Killer (festival), an international festival of TV and online series held in Brno, Czech Republic

== See also ==
- List of serial killers by country
- Serial Killer X, a fictional character from the 2005 videogame Condemned: Criminal Origins
- Mrs. Serial Killer (film), a 2020 crime drama from India
- A.K.A. Serial Killer (film), a 1975 crime documentary from Japan
- Serial (disambiguation)
- Killer (disambiguation)
- Serial Thriller (disambiguation)
- cereal killer (disambiguation)
