= Syrian Christianity =

Syrian Christianity may refer to:

- in territorial terms:

- Christianity in Syria - Christianity on the territory of Syria, historical or modern

- in denominational terms:

- variant term for Syriac Christianity in general, including:
  - East Syrian Christianity, variant term for Christian communities of the East Syriac Rite
  - West Syrian Christianity, variant term for Christian communities of the West Syriac Rite
- Syrian Christianity in India, variant term for all communities of Saint Thomas Christians, in India

== See also ==
- Syrian (disambiguation)
- Syriac (disambiguation)
