= Syrian Orthodox (disambiguation) =

Syrian Orthodox refers to the Syriac Orthodox Church, centered in Damascus, in modern Syria.

Syrian Orthodox may also refer to:

- Eastern Orthodoxy in Syria, the Eastern Orthodox Church in Syria, primarily:
  - Greek Orthodox Church of Antioch, centered in Damascus, in modern Syria
- Jacobite Syrian Christian Church, one of Oriental Orthodox Churches in India
- Malankara Orthodox Syrian Church, one of Oriental Orthodox Churches in India

== See also ==
- Syrian Christians (disambiguation)
- Syrian (disambiguation)
- Syria (disambiguation)
- Syriac Christianity
