= Syriac history =

Syriac history may refer to:

- History of the Syriac language, general history of the Syriac language and its variants
- History of Syriac Christianity, history of Syriac Christianity and its branches

== See also ==
- Syriac (disambiguation)
- Syrian (disambiguation)
