= Panikkar =

Panikkar is a Nair variation of the Panicker title used in India, specifically in the state of Kerala, which roughly comprises the former (British) Madras Presidency district of Malabar and the princely states of Cochin and Travancore. This title was usually conferred by the kings of Travancore on those individuals who were proficient in Kalaripayattu.

Notable members included:

- Achyuta Panikkar, an astronomer of Kerala
- Ayyappa Panikkar, (1930–2006), a Malayalam poet, critic.
- Kadammanitta Ramakrishnan (1935–2008), an Indian writer
- Madhava Panikkar, one of the Niranam Poets
- Sankara Panikkar, one of the Niranam Poets
- Sean Panikkar (born 1981), American operatic tenor
- Rama Panikkar, one of the Niranam Poets
- Kavalam Madhava Panikkar (1894–1963), Indian diplomat and writer
- Kavalam Narayan Panikkar (1928–2016), dramatist and poet
- K. N. Panikkar (1936–2026), Indian historian
- Raimon Panikkar (1918–2010), a Catalan scholar

Note: The main article is under Panicker, although that is not the most common of the many possible spellings of this name.
