= Paniker =

Paniker is a Malayali surname. Notable people with the surname include:

- Ayyappa Paniker (1930–2006), Indian poet, literary critic, academic, and scholar
- K. C. S. Paniker (1911–1977), Indian painter

== See also ==
- Panicker
