= Murder of Zahra Baker =

2010 murder in Hickory, North Carolina

Zahra Baker
- Born: Zahra Clare Baker; November 16, 1999; Wagga Wagga, New South Wales, Australia
- Died: September 24, 2010 (aged 10); Hickory, North Carolina, United States
- Cause of death: Undetermined homicidal violence
- Body discovered: October 26, 2010 Caldwell County, North Carolina, United States
- Known for: Murder victim

Zahra Clare Baker (November 16, 1999 – September 24, 2010) was a young Australian girl in Hickory, North Carolina, United States, who was reported missing on October 9, 2010. Only 10 years old at the time of her death, her dismembered remains were found in November 2010. Because of the crime's gruesome nature and the series of events leading up to her death, Zahra's murder received worldwide media coverage.

In September 2011, the victim's stepmother, Elisa Baker, pleaded guilty to murdering Zahra, and was sentenced to 18 years in prison. In 2013, she was sentenced to an additional 10 years for drug-related charges. While Baker told investigators that Zahra's father Adam Baker was involved in the crime, he was not charged, and the District Attorney said that the State had no evidence linking anyone but Elisa Baker to the murder.

== Australia ==
Zahra Baker was born on November 16, 1999, to Emily Dietrich and Adam Baker, who both lived in Wagga Wagga in New South Wales. Dietrich, who had postpartum depression after Zahra's birth, separated from Adam when Zahra was eight months old, and gave up full custody to him. Adam took Zahra and moved with his parents to Giru, Queensland in 2004 to work for a sugar mill. Zahra, who was diagnosed with bone cancer in 2005, later developed lung cancer as well. As a result, she had the lower part of one leg amputated and had to wear hearing aids.

Adam Baker reportedly met Elisa Fairchild (originally from western North Carolina) online on an IMVU website. Elisa Fairchild visited Adam Baker in Queensland and they were soon married. Elisa had been previously married six times and was still married at the time she married Adam Baker. Zahra's cancer went into remission in 2008, shortly before she moved to the United States from Australia with her father and new stepmother.

== North Carolina, U.S.A. ==
After moving to North Carolina, the Bakers settled in Hickory where Zahra attended public school until she was removed to start homeschooling. Whether she was ever actually homeschooled is unknown. It is suspected Zahra was taken out of public school because reports of child abuse were made to the school, implicating Elisa. Many of Zahra's neighbors claimed that Elisa was physically and mentally abusive, and neglected the child. Two teachers visited Zahra's home, after Zahra came to school with a black eye in a public school in Hudson while she was in the fourth grade.

Child Protective Services from both Caldwell and Catawba counties visited their various residences multiple times before Elisa Baker murdered her stepdaughter, Zahra. The Bakers had moved a few times in both those counties before settling in Hickory.

Reports of Elisa's abusive behavior were investigated by the Department of Social Services in regards to her own biological children dating as far back as 1999. She has a daughter from a previous boyfriend, and a son and a daughter from a previous marriage.

== 911 call ==
Elisa made a 911 call at 5:30AM on October 9, 2010, to report a fire in the back of the family residence in Hickory. The police arrived to find a ransom note and the smell of gasoline coming from Adam's company truck, a Chevrolet Tahoe.

In a second 911 phone call made to report Zahra missing at 2PM the same day, Adam Baker explained that during a fire in their backyard a $1 million ransom note was found on his company truck the night before, addressed to Adam's boss and landlord, Mark Coffey. Adam explained that they called 911 earlier that day about the fire and implied that whoever started the fire, may have done so to distract the family in order to take Zahra. Adam explained the purported kidnapper mistakenly confused Zahra for Mark Coffey's daughter. Coffey's daughter was unharmed and with her family, Adam stated. Adam said the last time he saw his daughter was at 2:30AM. Apparently, Adam Baker left for work early in the morning and did not return until after Zahra went to sleep.

== Investigation ==
=== Arrests and charges ===
Elisa failed a polygraph test she had taken early in the investigation. Investigators questioned Elisa regarding whether she had hurt Zahra, if she knew of anyone who had harmed Zahra, and if she knew who wrote the ransom note.

On October 10, 2010, search and rescue dogs were sent to search the Bakers' house and cars. The dogs gave positive alerts to the scent of human remains in both of the Bakers' cars, the Chevrolet Tahoe and a sedan. The police took swabs of what they thought might be blood from the car. Elisa Baker was then arrested for various crimes unrelated to the death of Zahra, including communicating threats, writing bad checks, larceny, and driving with a revoked license. Baker, who was jailed, was next charged with obstruction of justice after admitting that she wrote the ransom note, which led the police astray.

=== Bond hearing ===
In late October 2010, a Catawba County judge raised Elisa's bond from $40,000 to $65,000 at a bond hearing, believing that Elisa was a flight risk. Amber Fairchild, Elisa's daughter, testified at the hearing that her mother said she considered leaving North Carolina the day before she was arrested. Fairchild also stated that her mother was involved in an online relationship with a man from England who had sent her thousands of dollars. The prosecutor said, in response to the accused's lawyers attempts to lower her bond, that she had failed to show up at other court dates for charges that included traffic violations and communicating threats.

=== Discoveries ===
Elisa Baker's aunt, Bonzetta Winkler, told reporters that, according to Elisa, Zahra died after being sick for two weeks, and Elisa and Adam dismembered her and hid the remains. Elisa's aunt said, "She'd been sick two weeks before she died; when they found her, I guess they didn't know what to do. They just went wild." However, Elisa reportedly said Adam dismembered Zahra Baker alone after she died, and they both hid her remains. Elisa also told police that Zahra died on September 24 but was not reported missing until October 9.

Allegedly, crime memorabilia dealer and owner of Serial Killers Ink Eric Gein, used an assumed name to write to Elisa in jail. She twice wrote back to him, sharing some information. According to a letter written to Eric Gein, Elisa admitted, "We really didn't kill her, but what he did after the fact is kinda horrifying... (It) makes me scared of him."

Elisa reportedly told her attorney Lisa Dubs that Zahra's prosthetic leg was left in a dumpster that she and Adam had disposed of at Fox Ridge Apartments in Hickory. Dubs informed police of the possible evidence. A prosthetic leg was found in late October off a road in Caldwell County a few miles from a former residence of Elisa's. The Hickory police department were able to match the serial number of the prosthetic leg from Zahra's medical records they obtained from Australia, in order to confirm that it was definitely Zahra's leg.

In November 2010, Elisa Baker started leading police to different areas in Catawba and Caldwell counties to find Zahra's scattered remains. Numerous bones of Zahra were found, but Zahra's head was not found until some years later. Elisa allegedly told police she had thrown Zahra's mattress in a dumpster, and police confirmed the mattress fitting the description was found in a landfill.

Elisa Baker led the police to another dumpster behind a grocery store in Hudson where she and Adam dumped a car cover and bed cover, which was used to hide and transport Zahra. Elisa also told police they would find Zahra's body parts in the drain trap of the bathtub and that plastic gloves that she used would be found in her bathroom.

=== Elisa's MySpace page ===
A review of Elisa Baker's now-defunct MySpace page revealed she called herself "GothicFairy6668". Her page portrayed skulls and bones as Living Dead Girl by Rob Zombie was played. She listed "Never, neverland" as her hometown, Queensland, Australia, as her state and country and wrote that she was a college graduate and a proud parent. The page had photos of Zahra on it and in one photo, Zahra was wearing all black and the title read "The Dark Child!!!lol". Her "mood" on the page was listed as "crazy" on the last day she signed in, October 8, 2010, one day before Zahra was reported missing.

=== Elisa Baker's bigamy ===
Reportedly Elisa Baker was married seven times. At times, she was married to two or three men concurrently, not having divorced before remarrying. Prior to marrying Adam Baker, Elisa had been married to three men within three years. In January 2011, it was reported that Elisa Baker was charged with bigamy after it was confirmed that she was still married to Aaron Young when she wed Adam Baker. Elisa had introduced Aaron Young to Adam as her brother.

Elisa kept in frequent contact with Aaron Young, and they both visited an IMVU.com website on September 22, two days before the day Elisa later claimed Zahra died. The IMVU website featured "chainsaw massacre role-playing". Police investigated the claim of a woman who used the same social networking site as the Bakers that she had had a conversation with one or both of the Bakers about "doing a murder with chainsaws."

Accusations against two men related to Elisa Baker's previous husband, including one named Aaron Young, alleged that they raped Zahra and hit her on the head, causing her death. The two cousins, James Young and Timothy "Sammy" Young, were both investigated by the police for the allegations. Both men passed polygraph tests and were not charged. Sammy Young was alleged to have had a sexual relationship with Elisa and the two had taken illicit drugs together.

=== Murder charge ===
Since no cause of death could be determined, Zahra's death was ruled an "undetermined violent homicide". Elisa Baker allegedly told police that both she and Adam Baker had disposed of Zahra's remains, but according to cell phone towers, only Elisa, not Adam, was in the area where Zahra's remains were found. Investigators believe Elisa Baker killed and dismembered Zahra on September 24, 2010, and disposed of her remains the following day. Elisa Baker was indicted by a grand jury, for second degree murder with aggravating circumstances, on February 22, 2011, in Catawba County. The five aggravating circumstances were cited as:

- Elisa Baker had a history of physical, verbal and psychological abuse of the child.
- She secreted the child from her family, before and after the crime.
- She desecrated Zahra's body to hinder the murder investigation and prosecution.
- Zahra was young and physically disabled.
- Elisa Baker took advantage of a position of trust.

Elisa would have been charged with first degree murder had she not led law enforcement to Zahra's remains. Adam Baker has denied any involvement in Zahra's death and police found no credible evidence to suggest that he had any involvement in her death. Elisa Baker's bond was increased by $200,000 due to the murder charge, making the total bond $307,700.

=== Identity theft charges ===
In April 2011, Adam Baker was charged with identity theft and obtaining property under false pretenses. It was claimed that Adam Baker had used the identity of a man named James Starbuck and his Social Security number to get power connected to his apartment. James Starbuck is the husband of Elisa's daughter, Brittany Starbuck. Adam Baker was previously charged with passing worthless checks, communicating threats, assault with a deadly weapon and failure to return property.

With these new charges, Adam was ordered not to leave North Carolina without notifying the district attorney's office. He also was ordered to wear an electronic monitoring device on his ankle and was ordered to meet with U.S. Immigration and Customs Enforcement once a week. He had been hoping to return to Australia.

Elisa Baker was also charged with identity theft and obtaining property under false pretenses in February 2011. It was reported that Elisa had used her daughter, Brittany Starbuck's personal information to obtain telephone and utility service at one of the family residences in Caldwell County in March 2010. She pleaded not guilty to the four counts of identity theft in May 2011.

=== Drug charges ===
In May 2011, Elisa Baker was indicted with seven drug counts for the time period of May 2006 through October 2010. Elisa, who had used different addresses in both Catawba and Caldwell counties, had distributed Oxycodone, Hydrocodone and Alprazolam, all prescription drugs for pain and anxiety. She was charged with possessing, distributing and conspiring to distribute prescription drugs. These new federal drug charges combined with the previous unrelated charges brings the total to over twenty. On June 2, 2011, Elisa pleaded not guilty to all seven federal drug charges. She is facing up to 20 years in prison for each drug charge.

On March 4, 2013, U.S. District Court Judge Richard Voorhees sentenced Elisa Baker to serve 120 months in prison for conspiracy with intent to distribute prescription drugs.

=== Change of venue ===
Due to the publicity surrounding this case, Elisa Baker's attorney Scott Reilly requested a change of venue for the trial, which was scheduled to occur in Catawba County. On August 1, 2011, a change of venue for the trial was agreed upon by Superior Court Judge Timothy Kincaid. Judge Kincaid said the location of the trial would be decided on September 12, 2011. On September 15, 2011, Elisa Baker pled guilty to second-degree murder and was sentenced to 15 to 18 years in prison.

== Timeline ==
- August 2010 – Zahra was enrolled in a Hudson elementary school, but never attended. Elisa Baker notified the school that Zahra would be home-schooled.
- September 22, 2010 – Workers at a Hickory, North Carolina furniture store claimed they saw Zahra in the store while she was there with Elisa. This is the last time anyone claimed to have seen Zahra (other than her father and stepmother) before her remains were found.
- September 24, 2010 – Investigators believe Zahra Baker died on this day.
- September 25, 2010 – Investigators believe Zahra's body was disposed of on this day.
- October 9, 2010 – Two 911 calls placed: one at 5:30am to report a fire and another call around 2pm to report Zahra missing.
- October 10, 2010 – Elisa Baker arrested for various charges unrelated to Zahra.
- October 27, 2010 – Zahra Baker's prosthetic leg found.
- February 21, 2011 – Elisa Baker indicted for second-degree murder.
- February 21, 2013 – The Hickory Police Department confirm that a skull found in April 2012 belonged to Zahra Baker.

== See also ==
- List of solved missing person cases (post-2000)
- Trial by media
