= PT Givergis Paniker Karichal =

Indian Christian leader (1912–1986)

Rev. P.T. Givergis Panicker Karichal
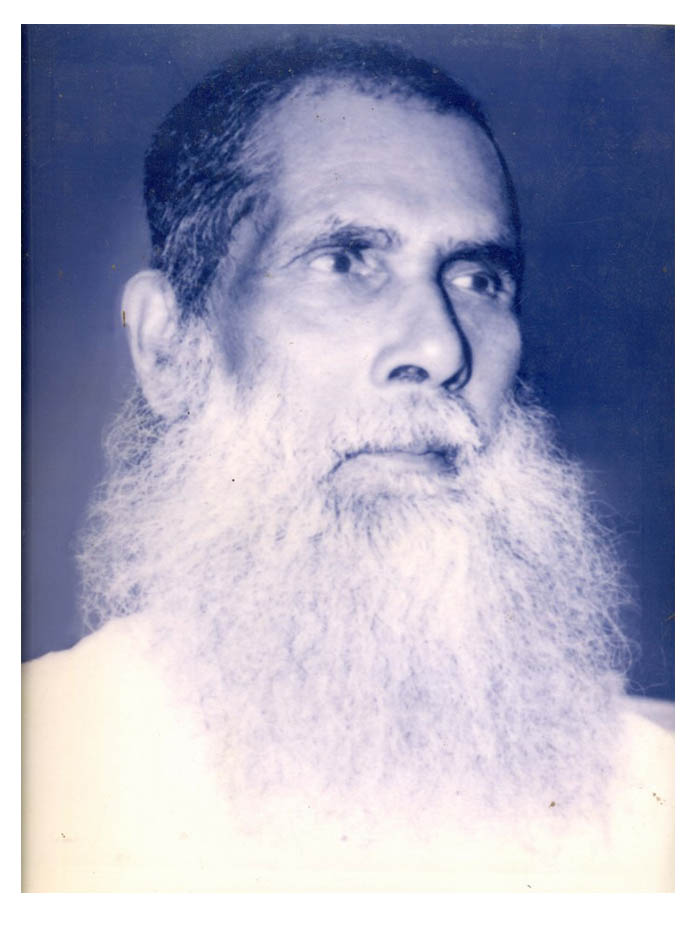
- Fr. P.T Givergis Paniker

Orders
- Ordination: 19 May 1936 by Geevarghese Mar Ivanios

Personal details
- Born: P.T. Givergis Paniker; 19 February 1912 Karichal, Alappuzha, Kerala
- Died: 23 October 1986 (aged 74) Karichal, Alappuzha, Kerala
- Buried: St.George Malankara Syrian Catholic Church, Karichal

P.T. Givergis Paniker Karichal was a priest, educationalist and astrologer of the Syro-Malankara Catholic Church. He is from the Panicker family, its 39th priest. He was the vicar of St. George Malanakara Syrian Catholic Church and the headmaster of St Mary's U.P school, Karichal.

== Early life ==
He was born on 9 February 1912 at Karichal, as the youngest son to Thomas Panicker and Mariyama Thomas Panicker. He was educated at the M.D. Seminary of the Orthodox Jacobite Church of Kerala and was ordained deacon on 3 June 1928 by the Metropolitan Geevarghese Dionysius of Vattasseril. He married Aleyamma in 1929 and was stirred by the Reunion Movement of Mar Ivanios who received him into the Catholic Church in 1931. He was ordained on 19 May 1936 by the late Archbishop Geevarghese Mar Ivanios of Trivandrum. Karichal was the first married deacon to become a priest in the Malankara Syrian Catholic Church.

Though never educated formally in a Catholic Seminary, he became a leading theologian of the Malankara Syrian Catholic Church. His unparalleled interest in the Antiochene Rite Liturgy led him to become a scholar of the Syriac language. By studying liturgical texts he was able to shed new light on the meaning of the oriental traditions of the Eucharistic Service. His article on 'The Holy Qurbono in the Syro-Malankara Church' which he contributed to The Eucharistic Liturgy in the Christian East testifies to this.

His notes and diaries on the Malankara Rite Liturgy were posthumously published in two volumes by his son P.G. Thomas Paniker, notably his writings and his lectures to the students of the Pontifical Seminary, As a professor there, his work was noted for originality and depth derived from his own prayer and reflection upon the mysteries of the liturgy.

As a resident priest of the village of Karichal in the District of Alleppey in Kerala, Givergis lived with his wife and children, He died on 23 October 1986. His priesthood golden jubilee was celebrated on 19 May 1986.

== Books ==
Givergis Paniker main work is The Holy Qurbono - In The Syro Malankara Church.
