= Madhava Panikkar =

Madhava Panikkar is the name of:

- K. M. Panikkar (1895–1963), Indian journalist, historian and diplomat
- one of the Niranam poets of the 14th and 15th centuries
