= Modern Syriac =

Modern Syriac or Neo-Syriac may refer to:

- Modern Syriac languages or Neo-Syriac languages, variant terms for Neo-Aramaic languages, in general
- Modern Syriac literature or Neo-Syriac literature, variant terms for modern forms of Syriac literature
- Modern Syriac identity or Neo-Syriac identity, variant terms for various forms of modern Syriac identity

== See also ==
- Syriac (disambiguation)
- Syrian (disambiguation)
