= Syrian language =

Syrian language may refer to:

- Languages of Syria, several dialects of Arabic as well as other languages without official status
  - Syrian Arabic language, encompassing all variants of Arabic language in Syria
  - Syrian Turkish language, encompassing all variants of Turkish language in Syria
  - Syrian Hebrew language, referring to local variants of Hebrew language in Syria
  - Neo-Aramaic language in Syria, referring to all variants of Neo-Aramaic language in Syria
- Palaeo-Syrian language or Eblaite, an extinct Semitic language
- Syriac language, an Aramaic language that emerged during the first century AD, literary language of various Christian communities

== See also ==
- Syrian (disambiguation)
