= Serial Thriller (disambiguation) =

"Serial Thriller" is a 2006 song by written by Christina Amphlett and performed by Australian singer Brielle Davis.

Serial Thriller may also refer to:

- Ednör – L'Attaque, a roller coaster that was named Serial Thriller when it was located at Six Flags AstroWorld
- Thunderhawk (Michigan's Adventure), a roller coaster that was named Serial Thriller when it was located at Geauga Lake

== See also ==
- Serial Killer (disambiguation)
