= Cerean =

Cerean may refer to:

- an adjective pertaining to the goddess Ceres (also Cererian, Cererean)
- an adjective and demonym pertaining to the dwarf planet Ceres
- List of Star Wars species (A–E)#Cerean, a fictional species in the Star Wars universe

== See also ==
- Cereal (disambiguation)
- Syrian (disambiguation) (a homophone)
- Kerian District
