= Sirian =

Sirian or Sirians may refer to:

- Sirian, Iran, a village in Isfahan Province, Iran
- George Sirian (1818–1891), American naval officer

== Fictional aliens ==
- Human adversaries in Lucky Starr and the Pirates of the Asteroids and other Lucky Starr novels by Isaac Asimov writing as Paul French
- Citizens of the Sirian Empire in The Sirian Experiments by Doris Lessing
- An alien race in The Age of the Pussyfoot by Frederik Pohl
- An alien race in Wasp (novel) by Eric Frank Russell
- An alien race in Serious Sam
- Alien invaders in XF5700 Mantis

== See also ==
- Sirianism, the position that Giuseppe Cardinal Siri was elected Pope in the 1958 papal conclave
- Siriano, a Tucanoan people indigenous to Colombia and Brazil
- Sirianus, the Catepan of Italy from 1062 to 1064
- The Sirius Mystery, a non-fiction book by Robert K. G. Temple
- Syriacs, or the Assyrian people
- Syrian (disambiguation)
