= Panicker =

Surname in India

Panicker was an honorary title conferred by the kings of Kerala to distinguished individuals. This title was given to prominent families from different communities and religions, including Syrian Christians, Nairs, Ezhavas, and others.

Many of these families were warriors and led soldiers. They were well known as masters of the Kalari tradition, with some having Nalpatheeradi Kalari centers (name derived from its area of 42 x 21 feet). They also propagated and practised Kalaripayattu, the native martial arts of Kerala.

== History ==
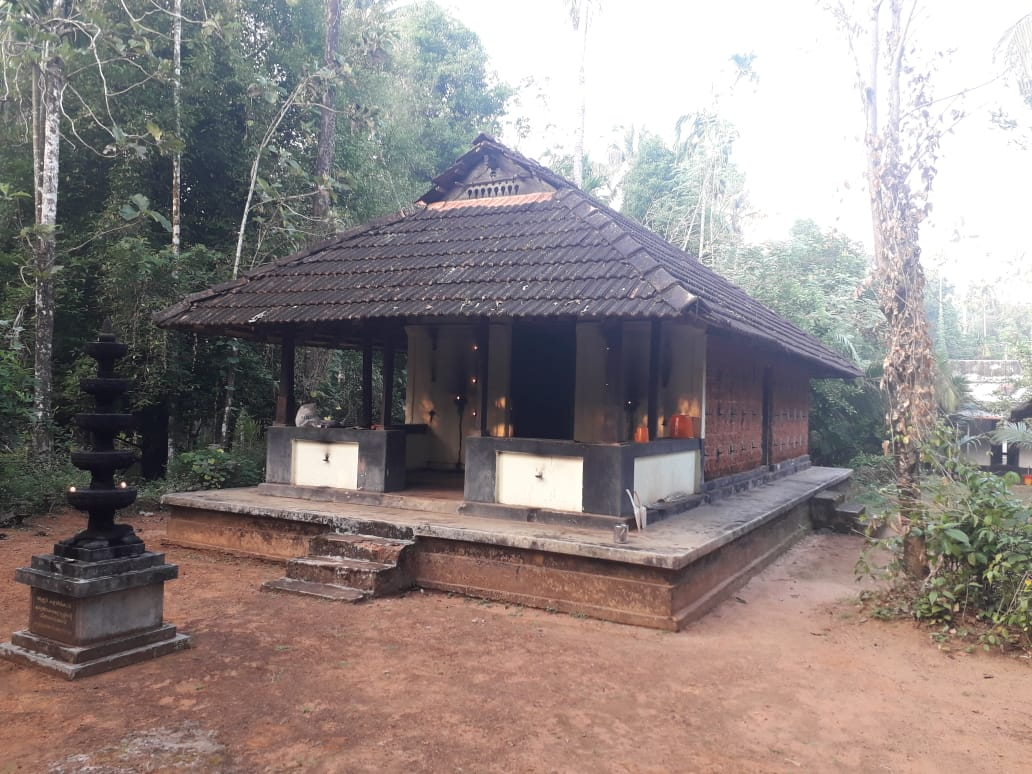
A present-day Kalari in Aloor, Thrissur, Kerala (Aloor Kalari)

Kalaris in Kerala were established during different periods. The formation of Kerala is interlinked with the story of Parashurama. It is believed that Parashurama established 108 kalaris across Kerala. Several kalaris were established during the reign of Kulasekharas. In the 12th century towards the end of Perumal era, the present state of Kerala was divided into small autonomous provinces called Nadus and ruled by its Kings. During the Kulasekhara rule and later the kings of Nadus brought in warriors from Tulu Nadu.

The Portuguese traveller Duarte Barbosa said that "They are the skillful men who teach this art Kalarippayattu, and they are called the Panickers: these are the captains in war." In Journal of the Epigraphical Society of India it, is given that "The teachers of martial arts in order to distinguish themselves from other Panikkars, named themselves as Vanma, Varma Panikkars, Other titles include a middle name of "Kalarikkal" (literally, 'of the kalari') generally following the name of the respective 'kalari' to which he/she belongs to.

=== Meloot Panicker ===
'Meloot' is a prominent varma family in kerala. During their dynasty period, the Meloot family branched themselves into two formations - Ruling authority and Military authority. Henceforth the military authority Meloot Varmas were acknowledged as Panickers (warrior) and upheld the kingdom's shield and administration. Varmas received principal royalty status from The Kingdom of Travancore Since 1827 for their service. They are chiefly known as Meloot Varma Panickers or Meloot Panickers." At present, Kalaripayattu is not practiced or followed in some of the Meloot families, yet they keep their tradition and heritage very close to them.

=== Mathur Panicker ===
'Mathur' is located in Nedumudi in the Alappuzha district, the home of Mathur Panicker, the Nair General of the Chembakassery King. The Mathur Temple and the Mathur Gallery are there. The place is famous for the arts of Kathakali and Velakali. Kunjan Nambiar stayed at the Mathur temple for Bhajan and offered prayers to Bhagwati. There are Padma Shri award-winning artists including Mathur Govindan Kutty. There is also references to Mathur Panikker in English and Dutch documents. There is existing the pathinaru kettu of Mathur built entirely of wood.

== Notable people ==
- Arattupuzha Velayudha Panicker, 19th Century Warrior and Social Reformer.
- Muloor S. Padmanabha Panicker, Malayalam poet and prominent social reformer
- Dinesh Panicker, film producer and actor
- Ayyappa Paniker, poet
- Cherayi Panicker, Army head of Zamorin
- G.N.Panicker, literary figure
- K. M. Panikkar (1895–1963), statesman and diplomat, professor, newspaper editor, historian and novelist
- K. N. Panikkar (born 1936), historian
- Kadammanitta Ramakrishnan (born M. R. Ramakrishna Panicker), writer
- Kavalam Madhava Panikkar, diplomat and writer
- Kavalam Narayana Panicker, dramatist, theater director, and poet
- N. Kesava Panikkar, zoologist
- P. K. Narayana Panicker, former General Secretary and President of the Nair Service Society
- P. N. Panicker, father of the Library Movement
- Prem Panicker, cricket journalist
- Puthumana Panicker: Title held by the Padanair(head of army) from Puthumana family
- Chandroth Panicker: Title held by the Padanair from Chandroth family, 15-year-old boy warrior chandroth chanthunni hailed from chandroth family
- Kokat Panicker: Title held by the Padanair from Kokat family
- Verkot Panicker: Title held by the Padanair from Verkot family
- Rahul Panicker, entrepreneur, president and co-founder of Embrace Innovations
- Renji Panicker, journalist, script writer, producer, actor, and director
- Niranam poets:
  - Madhava Panikkar, one of the Niranam poets
  - Rama Panikkar, one of the Niranam poets
  - Sankara Panikkar, one of the Niranam poets

See also Panikkar
