= Murderabilia =

Collectibles related to murders, murderers or other violent crimes

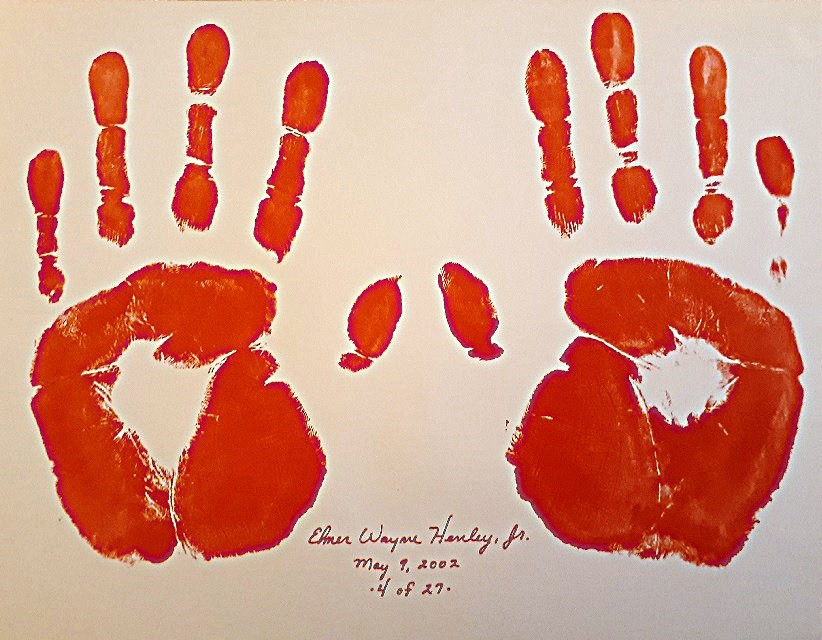
Commissioned handprint artwork of convicted serial killer Elmer Wayne Henley

Murderabilia is a term identifying collectibles related to murders, homicides, the perpetrators or other violent crimes. The term, a portmanteau of murder and memorabilia, was coined by Andy Kahan, director of the Houston Police Department's Crime Victims Office.

== Market ==
Buyers typically seek collectibles that are either artifacts used or owned by murderers or items (often artwork) created by them. Virtually anything once owned or created by mass murderers or serial killers can be marketed, such as vehicles, clothing, artwork, and weapons used in crimes. Most murderabilia is sold online. Serial Killers Ink was one of the largest online outlets for murderabilia.

Memorabilia from criminals such as Charles Manson and John Wayne Gacy have sold for thousands of dollars. Major online dealers of murderabilia may acquire items from prisoners, their families, or their attorneys. While in many jurisdictions prisoners are banned from operating businesses, it is sometimes possible for them to sell items because not all mail can be screened. In 2006, Ángel Maturino Reséndiz was caught selling his fingernail clippings from prison, resulting in his mail being flagged. Serial killer John Wayne Gacy created approximately 2,500 paintings for sale and, according to one of his appeal lawyers, had earned $30,000 from sales of his artwork by 1994. The New Republic and BuzzFeed News identified underground filmmaker Nick Bougas as one of the first murderabilia collectors, and The New Republic credited him with helping start the trend in the 1970 and 1980s.

In 2007, Wayne Lo, the convicted perpetrator of the 1992 Bard College at Simon's Rock shooting, caused controversy after it was found that he was selling his artwork online. In June 2011, the United States Government auctioned off personal items which belonged to Ted Kaczynski which were found in his Montana cabin upon his capture in 1996. The auction took place entirely online. The proceeds went to victims and victims' families of Kaczynski's crimes.

== Attempts to restrict sale of murderabilia items ==
In 2005, serial killer Alfred Gaynor's artwork was sold online in Massachusetts. State lawmakers proposed to block the activity, setting off a debate on free speech rights of prisoners. Andy Kahan, director of the Houston-based Mayor's Crime Victims Office, has lobbied strongly against the sale of murderabilia material. In May 2001, eBay banned the sale of murderabilia items. The sale of such items was banned in five states: Texas, California, New Jersey, Michigan and Utah.

United States Senator John Cornyn attempted multiple times to introduce bills that would federally ban the sale of murderabilia items. He first introduced the "Stop the Sale of Murderabilia to Protect the Dignity of Crime Victims Act" in 2007, and it died in committee. He introduced the bill again in 2010, this time working with Amy Klobuchar, and it died again. He tried and failed again in 2013 and 2015.

== See also ==
- Hybristophilia
- Lynching postcards
- Nazi memorabilia
- Son of Sam law
