= List of Cartoon Planet episodes =

This is an episode list for Cartoon Planet listed from its re-packaged season of 22 half-hour episodes that aired from 1997 to 1998 (followed by two specials episodes), along with the episode listings of the 2012 revival series. Cartoon Planet was a spinoff show of Space Ghost Coast to Coast that ran from 1994 to 2004.

== Series overview ==
Season	Episodes	Originally released	
Season	Episodes	First released	Last released
1	22	September 10, 1997	February 4, 1998
2	33	March 30, 2012	December 28, 2012
3	91	January 4, 2013	February 8, 2014

== Season 1 (1997–98) ==
- This season consists of 22 overall episodes which are made up of the skits from the original hour-long series minus the featuring of segments from cartoon shows.
- This season is hosted by Space Ghost, Brak, and Zorak.

Episode #	Original air date	Title	Openings and skits
1	September 10, 1997	Planet of Doom	Skits: Opening: Sleepy Ghost; Nothing; Good News; Zorak's Horrorscopes: Aquarius; Bad Bug; Brak's School Daze: Attendance Prank; Poets' Corner: Longfellow (There Was a Little Girl Who Had A Little Curl); Zorak's Nuggets of Joy: Camel Crickets; Brak's Comedy Gold #1; Mail Bag Day Theme: Opening; Mail Bag Day: Bottoms Up; Baloney Sandwich; Darling (as rendered by Zorak); The Cartoon Planet Storybook: Albert the Clown; Zorak's Helpful Hints Theme; Zorak's Helpful Hints: Broccoli; Stain; Mail Bag Day Theme; Mail Bag Day: Thornton P. Updyke; 20 Questions; Channel Zero; Closing Theme
2	September 17, 1997	Monkey Trouble	Skits: Alien; Opening: Shields & Yarnell Ghost; Apocalypse; Whenever; Brak's School Daze: Bike; Zorak's Nuggets of Joy: Camomile Tea; Don't Touch Me; Mail Bag Day: Letter for Brak; Something 2 Think About: Best Foot; Bay Gulls; I Love Almost Everybody; Coffee; The Cartoon Planet Storybook: Bunny Monster/My Dad; Zorak's Helpful Hints: Bullies; Moron Jokes; Clean This Up; Poets' Corner Theme; New Shoes; Today is Cheese Day; Dance of the Living Ghost; Closing Theme
3	September 24, 1997	Love That Brak!	Skits: Babies; Zorak's Nuggets of Joy: Demolished; Crazy Lovesick Fool; Zorak's Horrorscopes: Cancer; Learnin' to Talk Italian; Lesson One (In the Restaurant); Brak's School Daze: Cheese Bust; Did You Know?; Where Am I?; Highway 40 Revisited; Mail Bag Day: The Mad Cow; The Cartoon Planet Storybook: Close, But No Cigar; Rock My Baby; Zorak the Love Bug: Onion Burgers; Brak's Comedy Gold #3; An Ordinary Day on Cartoon Planet; Mail Bag Day: Yoko Kimono; Poets' Corner Theme; Poets' Corner: Life (Chubby Chubby Choo-Choo); Closing Theme
4	October 1, 1997	My Space Ghost the Car	Skits: Ed McMantis; Opening: Living Ghost; Complete Control; Cooking With Brak 3 (Tortel-weenies); What Day is It?; Brak's School Daze: Edward; Zorak's Nuggets of Joy: Devoured; Mailbag Editorial; Poets' Corner Theme; Poets' Corner: Stone Walls (To Althea, From Prison); I Love You Baby; Cartoon Planet Storybook: Easy Rider; Messages from Outer Space: Barnacle Boy; Zorak's Helpful Hints Theme; Zorak's Helpful Hints: Chuckie; Geography: Iowa; Mail Bag Day: Mad Dude; Something that Rhymes With Bones; Talkin' in My Sleep (Innermost Fears and Weaknesses); Closing Theme
5	October 8, 1997	The Mantis From Atlantis	Skits: 50 Winks; Opening: Living Ghost; Brak's Comedy Gold #4; Crazy Eights; Zorak's Nuggets of Joy: Falling Star; I Love Beans; Zorak's Horrorscopes: Gemini; Mail Bag Day Theme; Mail Bag Day: Chicken or Egg Page 2 (The Rest of The Story); Attilla; Brak's School Daze: Toothbrush; Poets' Corner Theme; Zorak's Beatnik Raps: Sitnam (They'll Never Take Me Alive); Fight the Power Bands; Mail Bag Day Theme: Opening; Mail Bag Day: Garyman; Cartoon Planet Storybook: Hey Goat!; Little People Zorak's Blues; Zorak's Helpful Hints Theme; Zorak's Helpful Hints: Dentist Mail Bag Day; Can't Read This "Darling"; Closing Theme
6	October 15, 1997	The Dangerous Danger	Skits: The Cartoon Planet Story; Doug (Brak is Sick); Mail Bag Day: Blast; Down to the River; Zorak's Nuggets of Joy: Taking Candy from a Baby; Brak's School Daze: Homecoming; Vacation Spots of the Universe: The Flying Island; Brak Dreams of Earth: Policeman; Front Door/Backside; Poets' Corner Theme; Poets' Corner: Tennis Anyone (Break, Break, Break); Mashed Potatoes; Count Floyd: Voodoo Doll/Tropical Vacation; Cartoon Planet Storybook: Lead Bunny; Scat Sandwich (Version 1—without lighting effects); Hero in His Own Mind; Boom, There You Go!; Geography: Ohio; Closing Theme
7	October 22, 1997	The Night the Lights Went Out on Cartoon Planet	Opening: When the lights go out on the set, Space Ghost goes into panic mode. Skits: Flagpole; Opening: Living Ghost; Brak's Tales of Suspense: Crazy John; Zorak's Nuggets of Joy: Fru Fru; Oh Fun Key Bay Bee; Zorak's Horrorscopes: Libra Francine; Brak's School Daze: Magic Marker; The Word For Today is Funky; Zorak's Helpful Hints Theme; Zorak's Helpful Hints: Zorak's Day Off; It's Not Easy Being Evil; Poets' Corner Theme; Poets' Corner: Sidekicks; Darling (as rendered by Space Ghost); Cartoon Planet Storybook: Little Helping Hands; Mail Bag Day Theme; Mail Bag Day: General Manager; Brak Can't Stop Laughing; Rubber Baby Buggy Bumpers; Hee Haw; Closing Theme
8	October 29, 1997	It's a Mad, Mad, Mad, Mad, Mad	Opening: Space Ghost and gang spoof the 1963 movie It's a Mad, Mad, Mad, Mad, World. Skits: Funny Looking; Opening: Living Ghost; Hoagy; Learnin' to Talk Italian: Lesson Two (Polite Disagreement); Zorak's Nuggets of Joy: Gandorf; Brak's Hawaiian Vacation; Brak's School Daze: Mascot; Zorak's Helpful Hints Theme; Zorak's Helpful Hints: Temporary; Insanity; Mail Bag Day: King Brak; Don't Send in The Clowns; Cartoon Planet Storybook: My Brother Matt; Zorak's Horrorscopes: Virgo; Smells like Cartoon Planet; Mail Bag Day: Doo Dah; Messages from Outer Space: Gar Jr.; Big Phat Ride; Closing Theme
9	November 5, 1997	The Big Mouths	Skits: Hole in the Floor; Opening: Living Ghost; Funseekers; Metalhead; Zorak's Nuggets of Joy: Galoshes; Brak's School Daze: Mask; Fat Head Day I Know This Guy; Zorak's Horrorscopes: Sagittarius; Poets' Corner Theme; Poets' Corner: Omelette; Pokin' Around; Blinking To Market; Count Floyd: The Oozing Killer Slime Monster in 3-D; Zingor!; Mail Bag Day Theme; Mail Bag Day: Fridge Magnet; Zorak Auditions; Zit; Closing Theme
10	November 12, 1997	Tom Foolery	Opening: Zorak, Brak, and Moltar decide to play a series of pranks on Space Ghost. Skits: How Ya Doin'?; Opening: Living Ghost; Water; Geography: Leema; Mail Bag Day: Hinder; Zorak's Horrorscopes: Scorpio; I'm a Sock that's Dirty; Sunday Drive; Moo Kaluka; Mail Bag Day: Mrs. Brak; Zorak's Beatnik Raps: Put the Cow Out; The Cartoon Planet Storybook: Skinny Fell in a Hole; Zorak's Nuggets of Joy: Good Book; The Word For Today is Schmoozin'; Zorak's Helpful Hints Theme; Zorak's Helpful Hints: Lance; Everyone Needs Lovin'; Talkin' in My Sleep (Naked); Fluffy Great Grape Ghost; Closing Theme
11	November 19, 1997	Goin' Ape!	Skits: The Cartoon Planet Story; Life is Good; Cooking With Brak 2 (Cancelled); Ramblin' and Wanderin'; Zorak's Nuggets of Joy: House Pets; Mail Bag Day Theme; Mail Bag Day: Wonder Woman; Brak's School Daze: Never Trust a Monkey; Pineapple; Mail Bag Day Theme; Mail Bag Day: Chris Funk; Mashed Potatoes; Poets' Corner Theme; Poets' Corner: Yeats (The Lover Tells of the Perfect Beauty); The Cartoon Planet Storybook: Skunky the Fur Trapper; Who's on First?; Yes Means No; Brak Dreams of Earth: Sheila Darnworth; Zorak's Helpful Hints Theme; Zorak's Helpful Hints: Nice; Hoodleehoo; Talkin' in My Sleep (Test); Mr. Blinky Poem #2; It Stunk; Closing Theme
12	November 26, 1997	Forbidden Socks	Skits: Living Ghost; Top Five Cartoons: "NASA" Countdown (first segment only); Cold Open: Mr. Smiley Face; Zorak's Nuggets of Joy: Little Red Riding Hood; Learnin' to Talk Italian; Lesson Three (Dinner Conversation); Stain; Nightmare; Brak's School Daze: The Future; Mail Bag Day: Venezuela; Geography: Pencil-vania; Poets' Corner Theme; Poets' Corner: Nevermore; Mail Bag Day: Mandy; Wake Up Song; Messages from Outer Space: Krell; The Cartoon Planet Storybook: The Squishey Monster; De Der Down; Video—Interactive Matthew Pants!; Closing Theme
13	December 3, 1997	The Empire Strikes Brak	Opening: Space Ghost and gang spoof the hit movie The Empire Strikes Back. Skits: Pizza; Opening: Living Ghost; Brak's Comedy Gold #2; Nasty No Pants!; Zorak the Love Bug: Love Names Page 2 (The Rest of The Story); Cherry Tree; Zorak's Nuggets of Joy: Ol' Runnin' Zorak; The Cartoon Planet Storybook: Taking Candy; Cranberry Blues; Mail Bag Day Theme; Mail Bag Day: Ruler of Earth; Zorak's Horrorscopes: Aries; Count Floyd: The Revenge of the Ghost Chicken; Zorak's Helpful Hints Theme; Zorak's Helpful Hints: Making Friends; Scat Sandwich (Version 2—with lighting effects); Mail Bag Day Theme; Mail Bag Day: Meeting The TV; Today is Noodle Day; Closing Theme
14	December 10, 1997	Momma!	Skits: Raise; Opening: Living Ghost; No Script; I Love Beans; Something 2 Think About: Change; Brak's School Daze: Twister; Zorak's Nuggets of Joy: Owa Tapi Gyam; Space Ghost Bo Bost Why Do Fools?; On Friendship; I Love You Baby; Mail Mag Day: Cottage Cheese; Poets' Corner Theme; Poets' Corner: Corned Beef; Zorak's Helpful Hints Theme; Zorak's Helpful Hints: My Dog Ate My Homework; Mr. Blinky Poem #1; I Don't Wanna Work Mistakes; Zorak's Blues; Mail Bag Day: Crazy Home; Talkin' in My Sleep (Tolarkian); New Powerbands; Lima Beans; Closing Theme
15	December 17, 1997	Space Ghost Dearest	Skits: Rehearse; Opening: Living Ghost; Thinkers; Zorak's Horrorscopes: Leo; Crazy Lovesick Fool; Zorak's Nuggets of Joy: Plankton; Brak's School Daze: Yearbook; Vacation; Spots of The Universe: Mr. Beak's Thrill Park; The Word For Today is Skallywag; The Song That Never Ends; Poets' Corner Theme; Zorak's Beatnik Raps: Marconi; Cartoon Planet Storybook: Texas; Bob Hero in His Own Mind 2 (Elvis); Mail Bag Day: Tom and Vinny; Don't Touch Me; I'm A Freak; Six Little Ducks #1; Mail Bag Day: Cake Mixer; Everybody Wants To Be Space Ghost; Space Ghost Penguin; Joke Blinking Contest; Bikini; Closing Theme
16	December 24, 1997 (Christmas Eve)	A Life in the Day	Skits: The Cartoon Planet Story; Brak's Tales of Suspense: Milk Nuts; Zorak's Horrorscopes: Capricorn; What Day is It?; Zorak's Nuggets of Joy: Rodeo Clown; Why?; Today is Beans & Franks Day; Mail Bag Day: Upstairs; I Love Almost Everybody; The Cartoon Planet Storybook: Texas Bob's Vacation; Babes; G'day, Mate; Big Head; Messages from Outer Space: Perk; Fight the Power Bands; Poets' Corner Theme; Do Jobbie; What are Little Girls Made Of?; Fanny Fisher; Closing Theme
17	December 31, 1997 (New Year's Eve)	Where's the Beach?	Skits: Space Ghost is Sad; Opening: Living Ghost; Brak's Comedy Gold #6; Silent Treatment; Bad Bug; Brak's School Daze: Mayonnaise; Mail Bag Day; Zorak the Love Bug; Bearded Lady; Zorak's Horrorscopes: Pisces; Zorak's Nuggets of Joy: Santa Claus; Brak's Dreams of Earth; Lost Dog Down to the River; Mail Bag Day: Blue Tail; The Cartoon Planet Storybook: Timmy Doesn't Have a Nose; Geography; Pet Peeve; Today is Onions Day; Blah Blah Blah!; Poets' Corner Theme; Shakespeare (Measure for Measure, Act IV, Scene I); Highway 40 Revisited; Zorak Mind Reader; Six Little Ducks #2; Minky Boodle; Closing Theme
18	January 7, 1998	Deadly Blasts of Hot Air	Skits: The Camera Loves Me; Opening: Living Ghost; Brak's School Daze: Gym Class; Human Resources; Water; Zorak's Nuggets of Joy: Shoe; Mail Bag Day: Zorak Doggie; Learnin' to Talk Italian: Lesson Four (Useful Terms); Ranch Dip; Poets' Corner Theme; Poets' Corner: Aunt Martha; Baloney Sandwich; The Cartoon Planet Storybook: What Goes Around Comes Around; Where is my Sandwich?; Imaginary; Count Floyd: Count Floyd's First Movie; I'm a Cucumber; Mantisland; Oh Fun Key Bay Bee; Mail Bag Day: Mantis Bottle; Mr. Blinky #1 (Trolley Bells); Muh Nuh Muh Nuh; Closing Theme
19	January 14, 1998	Toot! Toot!	Skits: Tip; Opening: Living Ghost; Cooking With Brak 1 (Pu Pu Pu); D'ya Know What I Was Just Thinking?; Zorak's Nuggets of Joy: Snack; Ramblin' and Wanderin'; Mail Bag Day Theme; Mail Bag Day: Venus Page 2 (The Rest of The Story); Morty Khan; Poets' Corner Theme; Poets' Corner: Tangerine Who?; Don't Send in The Clowns; Mail Bag Day Theme; Mail Bag Day: We Love You Man; Chuckie Monkey in Fairyland; The Word For Today is Gracias; Metalhead; The Cartoon Planet Storybook: What Does My Second Cousin Do?; Zorak's Helpful Hints Theme; Zorak's Helpful Hints: Underwear; Learn to be Evil; Closing Theme
20	January 21, 1998	Attack of the Cute Little Pups	Skits: Tortellini; Opening: Living Ghost; Brak's Comedy Gold #5; Stuffed Pork Chops; Zorak's Nuggets of Joy: Spankin'; Spoon; Front Door/Backside; Zorak's Horrorscopes: Taurus; Mr. Fanmail; I'm a Little Teapot; The Word For Today is Cooperation; Bad Mood; Zorak's Helpful Hints Theme; Zorak's Helpful Hints: Homework; Brak's Hawaiian Vacation; Get Lost; The Cartoon Planet Storybook: My Teddy Bear is Missing; Messages From Outer Space: Shiny Boy; Cranberry Blues; Poets' Corner Theme; Mr. Blinky Poem #2; Geography: Iowa; Burp; Closing Theme
21	January 28, 1998	Those Miserables	Skits: The Cartoon Planet Story; Hoodleehoo; Ordinary Guy; Don't Touch Me; Ramblin' and Wanderin'; Highway 40 Revisited; What Day is It?; Metalhead; Baloney Sandwich; Down to the River; Water; I Love Almost Everybody; Crazy Lovesick Fool; I Love You Baby; Stain; I Love Beans; Mashed Potatoes; Closing Theme
22	February 4, 1998	Ratingspalooza	Skits: A Message From The Cartoon Planet Producers; Opening: Sleepy Ghost; Nothing; Ratings #1 (One Line, Two Lines, Red Lines, Blue Lines); Ratings #2 (Backwards Chart); Puppy/Furniture; Ratings #3 (Old Yeller); Ratings #4 (Don't Joke About Ratings); Ratings #5 (One to Ten); Ratings #6 (It Can Count!); Stupid Stuff; Ratings #7 (Hard Sell); Ratings #9 (Noisy Brak); Ratings #10 (Monkeys); The Goat-Footed Balloon Man; Ratings #11 (Research); Ratings #12 (Ultra-7); Wussy; Closing Theme

== Season 2 (2012) ==
This season returns the show to its original one-hour format and also features episode segments from various cartoon shows. Instead of classic 1960s-era cartoons being showcased like the original format, this show now features Cartoon Network's earlier original cartoons, such as Dexter's Laboratory, The Powerpuff Girls, Johnny Bravo, and many more. Each show usually features either four 11-minute episodes, or three 7-minute episodes and two 11-minute episodes.

This season features the return of Brak and Zorak hosting, without Space Ghost, although in a skit for episode 25, a tiny clone of Space Ghost can be found on Brak's coffee mug.

The opening sequences of the Cartoon Network cartoons have been cut-short as of the 2010s.

Episode #	Original air date	Skits/shows
1	March 30, 2012	Skits: Pizza Song, Zorak's Poetry Beat, Dating Tips with Brak, Brak Complaints about Mustard, Brak's Comedy Jokes, Bushido Potatoes Shows: Dexter's Laboratory—"Jurassic Pooch" (7 minutes), Foster's Home for Imaginary Friends—"Seeing Red" (11 minutes), Johnny Bravo—"Johnny Bravo Meets Adam West" (7 minutes), The Powerpuff Girls—"Birthday Bash" (11 minutes), I Am Weasel—"I Am Ambassador" (7 minutes)
2	April 6, 2012	Skits: I'm a beanstalk, Brak's Comedy Jokes, Plap—Chicken Flavored, Dating Tips with Brak, Fountain Drop and Cheez Crickets Shows: The Grim Adventures of Billy & Mandy—"Chocolate Sailor" (11 minutes), Ed, Edd n Eddy—"Honor Thy Ed" (11 minutes), Chowder—"Chowder's Girlfriend" (11 minutes), Camp Lazlo—"Campers All Pull Pants" (11 minutes) Note: One part of Zorak and Brak singing in the end credits was removed for the current remainder of the series.
3	April 13, 2012 (Friday the 13th)	Skits: Brak Impersonates as a Chicken, Brak annoys Zorak, Dating Tips with Brak, Brak's Comedy Jokes, Make You Go Splat!, Plop—Chicken Flavored Shows: Courage the Cowardly Dog—"Scuba-Scuba Doo" (11 minutes), Codename: Kids Next Door—"Operation: D.O.D.G.E.B.A.L.L." (11 minutes), I Am Weasel—"I.R. Gentlemans" (7 minutes), Dexter's Laboratory—"Way of the Dee Dee" (7 minutes), Evil Con Carne—"The Pie Who Loved Me" (7 minutes)
4	April 20, 2012	Skits: Zorak's Poetry Beat, Make Stuff Happen on the T.V., Toilet Plops, Zorak's Video Game Chats, Zorak wants Dinner Shows: The Marvelous Misadventures of Flapjack—"Beard Buddies" (11 minutes), Cow and Chicken—"Cow Loves Piles" (7 minutes), The Grim Adventures of Billy & Mandy—"Toadblatt's School of Sorcery" (7 minutes), Dexter's Laboratory (Dial 'M' for Monkey)—"Peltra" (7 minutes), Johnny Bravo—"Bravo Dooby-Doo" (7 minutes)
5	April 27, 2012	Skits: MONKEYS!, Make Stuff Happen on the T.V., Corman's Happy Doots, Zorak Reviews Family Haircuts Extreme Shows: The Powerpuff Girls—"Bubblevicious" (11 minutes), Camp Lazlo—"The Big Cheese" (11 minutes), My Gym Partner's a Monkey—"Ain't Too Proud to Egg" (11 minutes)
6	May 4, 2012	Skits: TBA Shows: Foster's Home for Imaginary Friends—"Where There's a Wilt There's a Way" (11 minutes), The Marvelous Misadventures of Flapjack—"Bubbie's Tummy Ache" (11 minutes), Chowder—"Brain Grub" (11 minutes), Courage the Cowardly Dog—"So in Louvres Are We Two" (11 minutes)
7	May 11, 2012	Skits: TBA Shows: Dexter's Laboratory—"Quackor the Fowl" (7 minutes), Codename: Kids Next Door—"Operation: H.U.G.S." (11 minutes),The Grim Adventures of Billy & Mandy—"Tricycle of Terror" (11 minutes), Johnny Bravo—"Run Johnny Run" (7 minutes), Cow and Chicken—"Happy Meat" (7 minutes)
8	May 18, 2012	Skits: TBA Shows: Courage the Cowardly Dog—"The Revenge of the Chicken from Outer Space" (11 minutes), Camp Lazlo—"The Battle of the Pimple-back Mountain" (11 minutes), The Powerpuff Girls—"Boogie Frights" (11 minutes)
9	May 25, 2012	Skits: Brak's Comedy Jokes, Dating Tips with Brak, Toilet Plops, Zorak's Video Game Chats, Brak's Dream Shows: The Marvelous Misadventures of Flapjack—"Several Leagues Under the Sea" (11 minutes), Cow and Chicken—"Super-Model Cow" (7 minutes), The Grim Adventures of Billy & Mandy—"Meet the Reaper" (7 minutes), Dexter's Laboratory (Dial 'M' for Monkey)—Rasslor (7 minutes), Johnny Bravo—T is for Trouble (11 minutes) Note: First episode where one of the Cartoon Network programming had credits fully shown on the calendar (October 1995). This will happen again in the 35th episode.
10	June 1, 2012	Skits: Brak Sings a Song, Make Stuff Happen on the TV, Zorak wants Dinner, Poking at the TV Shows: Courage the Cowardly Dog—"Courage Meets Bigfoot" (11 minutes), Codename: Kids Next Door—"Operation: P.I.R.A.T.E." (11 minutes), I Am Weasel—"I.R. On Sun" (7 minutes), Dexter's Laboratory—"Dexter's Rival" (7 minutes), Evil Con Carne—"Evil Goes Wild" (7 minutes)
11	June 8, 2012	Skits: Zorak's Poetry Beat, Bushido Potatoes, Dating Tips with Brak Shows: The Powerpuff Girls—"Stuck Up, Up and Away" (11 minutes), Camp Lazlo—"Parasitic Pal" (11 minutes), Ed, Edd N Eddy—"Know It All" (11 minutes), My Gym Partner's a Monkey—"Inoculation Day" (11 minutes)
12	June 15, 2012	Skits: TBA Shows: Foster's Home For Imaginary Friends—"Bloo's Brothers" (11 minutes), Chowder—"The Froggy Apple Crumple Thumpkin" (11 minutes), The Marvelous Misadventures of Flapjack—"Cammie Island" (11 minutes), Courage the Cowardly Dog—"Night of the Weremole" (11 minutes)
13	June 22, 2012	Skits: TBA Shows: Dexter's Laboratory—"Star Spangled Sidekicks" (7 minutes), Codename: Kids Next Door—"Operation: I.-S.C.R.E.A.M." (11 minutes), The Grim Adventures of Billy & Mandy—"Puddle Jumping" (11 minutes), Johnny Bravo—"Endless Bummer" (7 minutes), I Am Weasel—"Power of Odor" (7 minutes)
14	June 29, 2012	Skits: TBA Shows: Camp Lazlo—"Marshmallow Jones" (11 minutes), The Powerpuff Girls—"Ice Sore" (11 minutes),Courage the Cowardly Dog—"Dr. Le Quack, Amnesia Specialist" (11 minutes)
15	July 6, 2012	Skits: TBA Shows: Chowder—"Stinky Love" (11 minutes), Foster's Home for Imaginary Friends—"Sight for Sore Eyes" (11 minutes), The Marvelous Misadventures of Flapjack—"Shave and a Haircut, Two Friends" (11 minutes), My Gym Partner's a Monkey—"Grub Drive" (11 minutes)
16	July 13, 2012 (Friday the 13th)	Skits: TBA Shows: The Powerpuff Girls—"Mommy Fearest" (11 minutes), Dexter's Laboratory (Dial 'M' for Monkey)—"Magmanamus" (7 minutes), The Grim Adventures of Billy & Mandy—"Chicken Ball Z" (7 minutes), Evil Con Carne—"Evil Con Carne" (7 minutes)
17	July 20, 2012	Skits: Pizza Song, Zorak's Poetry Beat, Bushido Potatoes, Desk of Brak, Dating Tips with Brak Shows: Courage the Cowardly Dog—"Cajun Granny Stew" (11 minutes), Codename: Kids Next Door—"Operation: N.O.-P.O.W.U.H." (11 minutes), I Am Weasel—"This Bridge Not Weasel Bridge" (7 minutes), Dexter's Laboratory—"Dexter Dodgeball" (7 minutes), Cow and Chicken—"Who Is Super Cow?" (7 minutes)
18	July 27, 2012	Skits: Brak Sings a Song, What's in my Mouth?, Brak's Comedy Jokes, Dating Tips with Brak (Olympics Episode) Shows: The Powerpuff Girls—"Major Competition" (11 minutes), Ed, Edd n Eddy - “Tag, Yer Ed” (11 minutes), The Marvelous Misadventures of Flapjack—"How the West was Fun" (11 minutes), My Gym Partner's a Monkey—"Me Adam, You Jake" (11 minutes)
19	August 3, 2012	Skits: TBA Shows: Foster's Home for Imaginary Friends—"Seeing Red" (11 minutes), Camp Lazlo—"Lights Out" (11 minutes), The Grim Adventures of Billy & Mandy—"Modern Primitives." (7 minutes), I Am Weasel—"I Are Big Star" (7 minutes), Evil Con Carne—"Everybody Loves Uncle Bob" (7 minutes) Note: A typo occurred on Cartoon Network's schedule. The Camp Lazlo episode was known as Swimming Buddy instead of Lights Out, which was in fact vice versa.
20	August 10, 2012	Skits: Brak Sings a Song, Brak's Dream, Brak's Comedy Jokes, Desk of Brak, Zorak's Video Game Chats, Old Man's Lawn Shows: The Powerpuff Girls—"The Powerpuff Girls' Best Rainy Day Adventure Ever" (11 minutes), Dexter's Laboratory (Dial 'M' for Monkey)—"Simion" (7 minutes), The Grim Adventures of Billy & Mandy—"A Grim Surprise" (7 minutes), Evil Con Carne—"Bring Me the Face of Hector Con Carne" (7 minutes)
21	August 24, 2012	Skits: Pizza Song, Zorak's Poetry Beat, Dating Tips with Brak, What's In My Mouth?, Brak's Comedy Jokes Shows: The Powerpuff Girls—"Mr. Mojo's Rising" (11 minutes), The Marvelous Misadventures of Flapjack—"Shave and a Haircut... Two Friends!" (11 minutes), My Gym Partner's a Monkey—"Bubble or Nothing" (11 minutes)
22	August 31, 2012	Skits: Desk of Brak, Dating Tips with Brak, Brak's Dream, Zorak's Video Game Chats Shows: Foster's Home for Imaginary Friends—"Phone Home" (11 minutes), Camp Lazlo—"Lights Out" (11 minutes), The Grim Adventures of Billy & Mandy—"It's Hokey Mon!" (7 minutes), I Am Weasel—"I.R. Mommy" (7 minutes), Evil Con Carne—"Son of Evil" (7 minutes) Notes: First episode to air at the last day of a month. After this episode, Cartoon Planet was in an indefinite hiatus for just over a month, being replaced with Flicks, Level Up or Dragons: Riders/Defenders of Berk.
23	October 5, 2012	Skits: TBA Shows: Courage the Cowardly Dog—"Night of the Weremole" (11 minutes), Codename: Kids Next Door—"Operation: T.R.I.C.K.Y." (11 minutes), I Am Weasel—"I Am Vampire" (7 minutes), Dexter's Laboratory—"Jurassic Pooch" (7 minutes), Cow and Chicken—"Happy Meat" (7 minutes) Notes: First holiday-themed episode, presumably "Halloween". This episode beat the first (original) season's record for 22 episodes with 23 episodes. This was also the first episode to air on Cartoon Network after Cartoon Planet's month-long hiatus.
24	October 12, 2012	Skits: Mini Brak Shows: The Powerpuff Girls—"Insect Inside" (11 minutes) My Gym Partner's a Monkey—"It's the Scary Old Custodian, Adam Lyon" (11 minutes), The Marvelous Misadventures of Flapjack—"K'nuckles is a Filthy Rat" (11 minutes)
25	October 19, 2012	Skits: Introducing Little Brak, Little Brak Sings, Zorak's Comedy Jokes, Zootie McGee's Hole Punchers Shows: Foster's Home for Imaginary Friends—"Everyone Knows it's Bendy" (22 minutes), Camp Lazlo—"Hallobeanies" (11 minutes), Evil Con Carne—"Max Courage" (7 minutes), I Am Weasel—"I Am Franken-Weasel" (7 minutes) Notes: First episode to use brand-new skits instead of recycled skits from past episodes. Also, a Space Ghost clone makes a cameo on Brak's coffee mug in the first skit.
26	November 2, 2012	Skits: TBA Shows: The Powerpuff Girls—"Boogie Frights" (11 minutes), Dexter's Laboratory (Dial 'M' for Monkey)—"Magmanamus" (7 minutes), The Grim Adventures of Billy & Mandy—"Tween Wolf" (7 minutes), Evil Con Carne—"League of Destruction" (7 minutes)
27	November 9, 2012	Skits: TBA Shows: Courage the Cowardly Dog—"Bad Hair Day" (11 minutes), Codename: Kids Next Door—"Operation: P.I.R.A.T.E." (11 minutes), I Am Weasel—"I.R. Gentlemans" (7 minutes), Dexter's Laboratory—"Dexter's Rival" (7 minutes), Dexter's Laboratory (Dial 'M' for Monkey)—"Peltra" (7 minutes)
28	November 16, 2012	Skits: TBA Shows: The Powerpuff Girls—"Beat Your Greens" (11 minutes), Camp Lazlo—"Marshmallow Jones" (11 minutes), My Gym Partner's a Monkey—"Shark Attack" (11 minutes)
29	November 23, 2012	Skits: TBA Shows: Foster's Home for Imaginary Friends—"Bloo's Brothers" (11 minutes), Chowder—"The Thrice Cream Man" (11 minutes), The Marvelous Misadventures of Flapjack—"How the West Was Fun" (11 minutes), Courage the Cowardly Dog—"The Demon in the Mattress" (11 minutes)
30	November 30, 2012	Skits: TBA Shows:, Dexter's Laboratory—"Mock 5" (7 minutes), Codename: Kids Next Door—"Operation: T.U.R.N.I.P." (11 minutes), The Grim Adventures of Billy and Mandy—"Spider's Little Daddy" (11 minutes), Johnny Bravo—"Bleack Blanket Bravo" (7 minutes), Cow and Chicken—"Field Trip To Folsom Prison" (7 minutes)
31	December 14, 2012	Skits: TBA Shows: Courage the Cowardly Dog—"The Nutbacker" (11 minutes), Codename: Kids Next Door—"Operation: A.R.C.T.I.C." (11 minutes), I Am Weasel—"Happy Baboon Holidays" (7 minutes), Dexter's Laboratory—"Dexter vs. Santa's Claws" (7 minutes), Evil Con Carne—"Christmas Con Cane" (7 minutes)
32	December 21, 2012	Skits: TBA Shows: The Powerpuff Girls—"Tough Love" (11 minutes), Camp Lazlo—"Snow Beans" (11 minutes), Johnny Bravo—"Back on Shaq" (11 minutes)
33	December 28, 2012	Skits: TBA Shows: Foster's Home for Imaginary Friends—"Everyone Knows it's Bendy" (11 minutes), Chowder—"The Vacation" (11 minutes), The Marvelous Misadventures of Flapjack—"The Sweet Life" (11 minutes), Courage the Cowardly Dog—"The Duck Brothers" (11 minutes)

== Season 3 (2013–14) ==
Episode #	Original air date	Skits/shows
34	January 4, 2013	Skits: TBA Shows: Dexter's Laboratory—"Lab of The Lost" (7 minutes), Codename: Kids Next Door—"Operation: C.A.T.S." (11 minutes), The Grim Adventures of Billy & Mandy—"Opposite Day" (7 minutes), My Gym Partner's a Monkey—"Cool Kids" (11 minutes), Cow and Chicken—"Squirt the Daisies" (7 minutes) Note: First time Cartoon Planet gets another season on the same series (revival version).
35	January 11, 2013	Skits: Brak's Comedy Jokes Shows: Camp Lazlo—"Lumpy Treasure" (11 minutes), The Powerpuff Girls—"Monkey See, Doggie Do" (11 minutes), Courage the Cowardly Dog—"Hothead" (11 minutes), Robotomy—"Bling Thing" (11 minutes) Notes: First episode to feature a Cartoon Network show that has been discontinued or short-lived.
36	January 18, 2013	Skits: Brak Complaint Letters, Zorak's Comedy Jokes, Brak Impersonates a Chicken, Mama's Hot Dogs Shows: Courage the Cowardly Dog—"Freaky Fred" (11 minutes), I Am Weasel—"I.R. Plant Life" (7 minutes), Dexter's Laboratory—"Old Man Dexter" (7 minutes), Evil Con Carne—"Fools Paradise" (7 minutes), Secret Mountain Fort Awesome—"Teleport-a-Potty" (11 minutes) Notes: First episode to feature a current Cartoon Network show that has been on hiatus.
37	January 25, 2013	Skits: Complaint Letter, Ole to a Desiased Chimpanzee, Dating Tips With Brak, What's in My Mouth? Shows: The Powerpuff Girls—"Octi Evil" (11 minutes), Camp Lazlo—"Tree Hugger" (11 minutes), Ed, Edd n Eddy—"Hot Buttered Ed" (11 minutes), The Problem Solverz—"Time Twister" (11 minutes)
38	February 1, 2013	Skits: Zorak's Poetry Beat, Brak's Comedy Jokes, Plap, Dating Tips with Brak, Toilet Plops Shows: Foster's Home For Imaginary Friends—"Sight for Sore Eyes" (11 minutes), Chowder—"The Flibber-Flabber Diet" (11 minutes), The Marvelous Misadventures of Flapjack—"Several Leagues Above the Sea" (11 minutes), Robotomy—"The Playdate" (11 minutes)
39	February 8, 2013	Skits: Brak Impersonates a Chicken, Dating Tips With Brak, Dating Tips With Brak, Brak's Comedy Jokes, Make You go Splat!, Zorak's Comedy Jokes Shows: Dexter's Laboratory—"Sassy Come Home" (11 minutes), The Grim Adventures of Billy & Mandy—"Keeper of the Reaper" (7 minutes), Johnny Bravo—"Bravo, James Bravo" (7 minutes), Cow & Chicken—"Cow's Instincts... Don't It?" (7 minutes), Secret Mountain Fort Awesome—"Monster Cops" (11 minutes)
40	February 15, 2013	Skits: TBA Shows: Camp Lazlo—"Snake Eyes" (11 minutes), The Powerpuff Girls—"The Bare Facts" (11 minutes), Courage the Cowardly Dog—"Journey to the Center of Nowhere" (11 minutes), The Problem Solverz—"Video games" (11 minutes)
41	February 22, 2013	Skits: TBA Shows: Courage the Cowardly Dog—"The Gods Must Be Goosey" (11 minutes), I Am Weasel—"I, Architect" (7 minutes), Dexter's Laboratory—"Dexter's Assistant" (7 minutes), Evil Con Carne—"Ultimate Evil" (7 minutes), Robotomy—"Bling Thing" (11 minutes)
42	March 1, 2013	Skits: Buster the Bear, Brak's Dream, Brak's Comedy Jokes, Pasta Grandma's Eat! Eat!, Brak Chicken Impression Shows: The Powerpuff Girls—"Mime for a Change" (11 minutes), Camp Lazlo—"Racing Slicks" (11 minutes), Ed, Edd n Eddy—"Fool on an Ed" (11 minutes), Secret Mountain Fort Awesome—"Secret Mountain Fort Love" (11 minutes) Notes: Final episode to feature an episode of Secret Mountain Fort Awesome.
43	March 8, 2013	Skits: Mini Brak, Dating Tips With Brak, Make Stuff Happen on the T.V., Make You Go Splat! Shows: Foster's Home for Imaginary Friends—"Phone Home" (11 minutes), Chowder—"Chowder Grows Up" (11 minutes), The Marvelous Misadventures of Flapjack—"Kid Nickles" (11 minutes), Courage the Cowardly Dog—"Heads of Beef" (11 minutes)
44	March 15, 2013	Skits: Zorak's Poetry Beat, Brak's Comedy Jokes, Horse Pellas, Controller's Running out of Power, More Brak's Comedy Jokes, Brak's Dream Shows: Dexter's Laboratory—"Golden Diskette" (11 minutes), Codename: Kids Next Door—"Operation B.U.T.T." (11 minutes), The Grim Adventures of Billy & Mandy—"Be a Fred be very a Fred" (7 minutes), Johnny Bravo—"Jumbo Johnny" (7 minutes), Cow & Chicken—"The Molting Fairy" (7 minutes)
45	March 29, 2013	Skits: Zorak's Poetry Beat, Brak's Comedy Jokes, Horse Pellas, Controller's Running out of Power, More Brak's Comedy Jokes, Brak's Dream Shows: Courage the Cowardly Dog—"Evil Weevil" (7 minutes), Codename: Kids Next Door—"Operation P.I.A.N.O." (11 minutes), I Am Weasel—"I.R. Pixie Fairie" (7 minutes), Dexter's Laboratory—"Dream Machine" (7 minutes), Evil Con Carne—"The Trouble with Skarrina" (7 minutes)
46	April 5, 2013	Skits: Zorak's Poetry Beat, Brak's Comedy Jokes, Horse Pellas, Controller's Running out of Power, More Brak's Comedy Jokes, Brak's Dream Shows: Camp Lazlo—"It's No Picnic" (11 minutes), The Powerpuff Girls—"Superfriends" (11 minutes), Courage the Cowardly Dog—"Klub Katz" (11 minutes), Ed, Edd n Eddy—"A Pinch to Grow an Ed" (11 minutes)
47	April 12, 2013	Skits: Mini Brak, Make You Go Splat!, Zorak's Poetry Beat Shows: My Gym Partner's a Monkey—"Shiney Thing" (11 minutes), Courage the Cowardly Dog—"Queen of the Black Puddle" (11 minutes), Scaredy Squirrel—"There in No 'I' in Groceries" (11 minutes), Johnny Bravo—"The Sensitive Male" (11 minutes) Note: This is the first episode to show a Canadian/Teletoon/YTV programming. It broke the block's original tradition because of that.
48	April 19, 2013	Skits: Toilet Plops Shows: Foster's Home For Imaginary Friends—"Seeing Red" (11 minutes), Chowder—"Mung on the Rock" (11 minutes), The Marvelous Misadventures of Flapjack—"No Syrup for Old Flapjack" (11 minutes), Almost Naked Animals—"What Would Batty Do?" (11 minutes)
49	April 26, 2013	Skits: Zorak's Poetry Beat, Family Barber Extreme, Happy Doots, Mini Brak, Zorak's Comedy Jokes, Weirdest Dream Shows: Dexter's Laboratory—"Sister Mom" (11 minutes), Tom and Jerry Tales—"Power Tom" (7 minutes), Codename: Kids Next Door—"Operation: L.I.Z.Z.I.E." (11 minutes), The Grim Adventures of Billy & Mandy—"Nursery Crimes" (7 minutes), Cow and Chicken—"Crash Dive!" (7 minutes) Note: This is the first episode to show a programming produced by Warner Bros. Animation.
50	May 3, 2013	Skits: The Incident, Brak's Comedy Jokes, Bushido Potatoes, Old Man's Lawn Shows: Camp Lazlo—"Beans and Pranks" (11 minutes), The Powerpuff Girls—"Beat Your Greens" (11 minutes), Courage the Cowardly Dog—"The Magic Tree of Nowhere" (11 minutes), Scaredy Squirrel—"The Coast is Fear" (11 minutes)
51	May 10, 2013	Skits: TBA Shows: Foster's Home For Imaginary Friends—"Bloo's Brothers" (11 minutes), Chowder—"Stinky Love" (11 minutes), The Marvelous Misadventures of Flapjack—"Footburn" (11 minutes), Almost Naked Animals—"Hurricane Seasoning" (11 minutes)
52	May 17, 2013	Skits: TBA Shows: Codename: Kids Next Door—"Operation: Z.O.O." (11 minutes), Dexter's Laboratory—"Babysitter Blues" (11 minutes), Courage the Cowardly Dog—"Courage Meets Bigfoot" (11 minutes), Johnny Bravo—"The Aisle of Mixed-Up Toys", Tom and Jerry Tales—"Bend It Like Thomas" (11 minutes)
53	May 24, 2013	Skits: TBA Shows: My Gym Partner's a Monkey—"Lyon of Scrimmage" (11 minutes), The Powerpuff Girls—"You Snooze, You Lose" (11minutes), Camp Lazlo—"Camp Kidney Stinks" (11 minutes), Scaredy Squirrel—"Way of the Fishlips" (11 minutes)
54	May 31, 2013	Skits: Zorak's Poetry Beat, Brak's Comedy Jokes, Plap Chicken Flaver, Dating Tips With Brak, Fountain Drop Sode & Cheeze Crickets Shows: Camp Lazlo—"Prickly Pining Dining" (11 minutes), Codename: Kids Next Door—"Operation: C.A.M.P." (11 minutes), Ed, Edd n Eddy—"Look Into My Eds" (11 minutes), Almost Naked Animals—"The Duck Vinci Code" (11 minutes)
55	June 7, 2013	Skits: TBA Shows: Courage the Cowardly Dog—"Night of the Scarecrow" (11 minutes), The Grim Adventures of Billy and Mandy—"Really Odd Couple (11 minutes), Dexter's Laboratory—"Space Case" (11 minutes), The Marvelous Misadventures of Flapjack—"That's a Wrap!" (11 minutes), Tom and Jerry Tales—"Spaced Out Cat" (11 minutes)
56	June 14, 2013	Skits: TBA Shows: Camp Lazlo—"Loogie Llama" (11 minutes), The Powerpuff Girls—"Imaginary Fiend" (11 minutes), MAD—"The Straight A-Team / Gaming's Next Top Princess" (11 minutes), Courage the Cowardly Dog—"Nowhere TV" (11 minutes) Note: This is the first episode to show a currently-running Cartoon Network show. The end credits for the Almost Naked Animals episode "Imaginary Fiend" was shown in place of those for the Powerpuff Girls episode of the same name.
57	June 21, 2013	Skits: TBA Shows: Chowder—"At Your Service" (11 minutes), MAD—"G.I. E.I. Joe / Dog with a Captain's Log" (11 minutes), The Marvelous Misadventures of Flapjack—"Oh Brother" (11 minutes), Foster's Home for Imaginary Friends—"Sight for Sore Eyes" (11 minutes)
58	June 27, 2013	Skits: TBA Shows: The Powerpuff Girls—"Octi Evil" (11 minutes), Courage the Cowardly Dog—"Cajun Granny Stew" (11 minutes), Codename: Kids Next Door—"Operation: T.U.R.N.I.P." (11 minutes), Camp Lazlo—"Gone Fishin' (Sort of)" (11 minutes)
59	June 28, 2013	Skits: TBA Shows: MAD—"Papa / 1600 Finn" (11 minutes), Courage the Cowardly Dog—"Hunchback of Nowhere" (11 minutes), Codename: Kids Next Door—"Operation O.F.F.I.C.E." (11 minutes), Dexter's Laboratory—"Dexter's Wacky Races" (11 minutes)
60	July 5, 2013	Skits: TBA Shows: My Gym Partner's a Monkey—"Yesterday's Funny Monkey" (11 minutes), MAD—"Les the Miz / Lex Factor" (11 minutes), Camp Lazlo—"It's No Picnic" (11 minutes), The Powerpuff Girls—"Major Competition" (11 minutes)
61	July 11, 2013	Skits: TBA Shows: Courage the Cowardly Dog—"Little Muriel" (11 minutes), Codename: Kids Next Door—"Operation: C.O.W.G.I.R.L." (11 minutes), Camp Lazlo—"Float Trippers" (11 minutes), The Powerpuff Girls—"The Powerpuff Girls' Best Rainy Day Adventure Ever" (11 minutes)
62	July 12, 2013	Skits: TBA Shows: Ed, Edd n Eddy—"A Boy and His Ed" (11 minutes), Almost Naked Animals—"Employee of the Month for Life"(11 minutes), Camp Lazlo—"Tree Hugger" (11 minutes), Codename: Kids Next Door—"Operation: P.O.I.N.T" (11 minutes)
63	July 18, 2013	Skits: TBA Shows: The Marvelous Misadventures of Flapjack—"How the West Was Fun!" (11 minutes), Foster's Home for Imaginary Friends—"Seeing Red" (11 minutes), Ed, Edd n Eddy—"Avast Ye Eds!" (11 minutes), MAD—"Twilight: Breaking Down / GOllum On" (11 minutes)
64	July 19, 2013	Skits: TBA Shows: The Grim Adventures of Billy and Mandy—"A Dumb Wish" (11 minutes), Dexter's Laboratory—"Dimwit Dexter" (11 minutes), Tom and Jerry Tales—"Fire Breathing Tomcat" (11 minutes), The Marvelous Misadventures of Flapjack—"Lookin' For Love (in all the Wrong Barrels)" (11 minutes)
65	July 25, 2013	Skits: TBA Shows: Codename: Kids Next Door—"Operation P.I.R.A.T.E." (11 minutes), The Powerpuff Girls—"Mommy Fearest" (11 minutes), The High Fructose Adventures of Annoying Orange—"Island of Dr. Fruitenstein" (11 minutes), Chowder—"Chowder's Girlfriend" (11 minutes)
66	July 26, 2013	Skits: TBA Shows: Camp Lazlo—"The Nothing Club" (11 minutes), The Powerpuff Girls—"Schoolhouse Rocked" (11 minutes), Courage the Cowardly Dog—"Shirley the Medium" (11 minutes), MAD—"Wreck It Gandalph / The Big Bird Theory" (11 minutes)
67	August 1, 2013	Skits: TBA Shows: Camp Lazlo—"Lights Out" (11 minutes), Codename: Kids Next Door—"Operation: M.I.N.I.-G.O.L.F." (11 minutes), MAD—"George Washington: Cherry Tree Chopper / Star Wars Earned Stripes" (11 minutes), Courage the Cowardly Dog—"The Revenge of the Chicken from Outer Space" (11 minutes)
68	August 2, 2013	Skits: TBA Shows: Foster's Home for Imaginary Friends—"Phone Home" (11 minutes), The Marvelous Misadventures of Flapjack—"Snarked" (11 minutes), Chowder—"Burple Nurples" (11 minutes), MAD—"Pokémonsters, Inc. / Bane & Kate" (11 minutes)
69	August 9, 2013	Skits: TBA Shows: MAD—"The Perks of Being a Wallcrawler / Regular Shogun Warriors" (11 minutes), Courage the Cowardly Dog—"The Great Fusilli" (11 minutes), Codename: Kids Next Door—"Operation: Q.U.I.E.T." (11 minutes), Dexter's Laboratory—"Go, Dexter Family, Go!" (11 minutes)
70	August 15, 2013	Skits: TBA Shows: Codename: Kids Next Door—"Operation: S.H.A.V.E." (11 minutes), Camp Lazlo—"Dosey Doe" (11 minutes), The Powerpuff Girls—"Cootie Gras" (11 minutes), Courage the Cowardly Dog—"Cowboy Courage" (11 minutes)
71	August 16, 2013	Skits: TBA Shows: The Powerpuff Girls—"Collect Her" (11 minutes), Camp Lazlo—"Movie Night" (11 minutes), MAD—"Fantastic Four Christmases / Red & White Collar" (11 minutes), My Gym Partner's a Monkey—"Le Switcharoo" (11 minutes)
72	August 23, 2013	Skits: Brak’s Complaint Letter, Brak’s Weird Dream, Brak’s Comedy Jokes, Zorak Video Game Chats, Old Man’s Lawn Shows: Ed, Edd n Eddy—"Nagged To Ed" (11 minutes), Camp Lazlo—"No Beads, No Business" (11 minutes), Foster's Home For Imaginary Friends—"Bloo's Brothers" (11 minutes), Codename: Kids Next Door—"Operation: T.O.M.M.Y." (11 minutes),
73	August 30, 2013	Skits: TBA Shows: Courage the Cowardly Dog—"Robot Randy" (11 minutes), The Marvelous Misadventures of Flapjack—"Pun Times" (11 minutes), Johnny Bravo—"Hip Hop Flop" (7 minutes), The Grim Adventures of Billy and Mandy—"Mandy the Merciless" (7 minutes), Dexter's Laboratory—"Double Trouble" (7 minutes), Notes: Final episode to air on a Friday since its timeslot has been replaced with Pizza Night with Pizza Steve and Cartoon Planet has been moved to the weekends.
74	September 7, 2013	Skits: TBA Shows: Camp Lazlo—"It's No Picnic" (11 minutes), The Powerpuff Girls—"Stuck Up, Up and Away" (11 minutes), Codename: Kids Next Door—"Operation: I-S.C.R.E.A.M." (11 minutes), Courage the Cowardly Dog—"Courage Meets Bigfoot" (11 minutes),
75	September 8, 2013	Skits: UK National Anthem, Brak's Comedy Jokes, Make you go Splat!, Buster the Bear, Shows: MAD—"Batsby / Big Time Gold Rush" (11 minutes), The Marvelous Misadventures of Flapjack—"Several Leagues Under the Sea" (11 minutes), The Grim Adventures of Billy and Mandy—"The Problem With Billy" (11 minutes), The High Fructose Adventures of Annoying Orange—"Island of Dr. Fruitenstein" (11 minutes)
76	September 14, 2013	Skits: Brak's Comedy Jokes, Make you go Splat!, Chicken Impression, Zorak's Poetry Beat, Pizza Song, Happy Doots Shows: Camp Lazlo—"Marshmallow Jones" (11 minutes), Codename: Kids Next Door—"Operation N.O.-P.O.W.U.H" (11 minutes), Chowder—"Schnitzel Makes a Deposit" (11 minutes), The High Fructose Adventures of Annoying Orange—"Orange's Run" (11 minutes)
77	September 15, 2013	Skits: TBA Shows: The Powerpuff Girls—"Paste Makes Waste" (11 minutes), Codename: Kids Next Door—"Operation: T.H.E.-F.L.Y." (11 minutes), MAD—"The Life of Rhyme / Here Come Yogi Boo Boo" (11 minutes), Courage the Cowardly Dog—"Le Quack Balloon" (11 minutes)
78	September 22, 2013	Skits: TBA Shows: Codename: Kids Next Door—"Operation: D.A.T.E." (11 minutes), Ed, Edd n Eddy—"Tag Yer Ed" (11 minutes), MAD—"Cliffordfield / Big Time Rushmore" (11 minutes), The Marvelous Misadventures of Flapjack—"Shave and a Haircut... Two Friends" (11 minutes)
79	September 28, 2013	Skits: TBA Shows: Camp Lazlo—"Lights Out" (11 minutes), Codename: Kids Next Door—Operation: R.A.I.N.B.O.W.S. (11 minutes), Chowder—"Sing Beans (11 minutes), The High Fructose Adventures of Annoying Orange—"Marshmallow Wedding" (11 minutes)
80	September 29, 2013	Skits: TBA Shows: The Amazing World of Gumball—"The Game" (11 minutes), Codename: Kids Next Door—"Operation: C.A.B.L.E.-T.V." (11 minutes), MAD—"Bourne Leg as Turkey / PilGrimm" (11 minutes), Courage the Cowardly Dog—"The Precious, Wonderful, Adorable, Lovable Ducking" (11 minutes)
81	October 5, 2013	Skits: TBA Shows: Foster's Home for Imaginary Friends—"Phone Home" (11 minutes), The Powerpuff Girls—"Insect Inside" (11 minutes), MAD—"Lone Rango / Whose" (11 minutes), The Marvelous Misadventures of Flapjack—"Mechanical Genie Island" (11 minutes)
82	October 6, 2013	Skits: TBA Shows: Ed, Edd n Eddy—"Laugh Ed, Laugh" (11 minutes), Camp Lazlo—"Meatman" (11 minutes), The Powerpuff Girls—"Telephonies" (11 minutes), Courage the Cowardly Dog—"Night of the Vampire" (11 minutes)
83	October 12, 2013	Skits: TBA Shows: The Grim Adventures of Billy and Mandy—"Bad News Ghoul" (11 minutes), Camp Lazlo—"Hallobeanies" (11 minutes), The Powerpuff Girls—"Dream Scheme" (11 minutes), Courage the Cowardly Dog—"Human Habitrail" (11 minutes)
84	October 13, 2013	Skits: TBA Shows: MAD—"Star Bleech Into Dumbness / Stark Tank" (11 minutes), The Marvelous Misadventures of Flapjack—"Eye Sea You" (11 minutes), The Grim Adventures of Billy and Mandy—"Lil' Porkchop" (11 minutes), The High Fructose Adventures of Annoying Orange—"Orange Say Knock You Out" (11 minutes), Ed, Edd n Eddy—"Dawn of the Eds" (11 minutes)
85	October 20, 2013	Skits: TBA Shows: Codename: Kids Next Door—"Operation: T.R.I.C.K.Y. (11 minutes), Johnny Bravo—"Bravo Dooby-Doo" (7 minutes), Chowder—"Chowder Loses His Hat" (11 minutes), The High Fructose Adventures of Annoying Orange—"Peartegeist" (11 minutes)
86	October 26, 2013	Skits: TBA Shows: TBA
87	November 2, 2013	Skits: TBA Shows: TBA Notes: On this date, Cartoon Planet began airing daily.
88	November 3, 2013	Skits: TBA Shows: Camp Lazlo- Hello Dolly (11 minutes), Dexter's Laboratory- Dee Dee and the Man (11 minutes), Chowder -The Heavy Sleeper (11 minutes), The High Fructose Adventures of Annoying Orange -Armagourdon (11 minutes)
89	November 4, 2013	Skits: TBA Shows: Codename: Kids Next Door- Operation T.E.E.T.H. (11 minutes), Courage the Cowardly Dog- A Night At The Katz Motel (11 minutes), Johnny Bravo- My Funny Looking Friend (11 minutes), Camp Lazlo- It's No Picnic
90	November 5, 2013	Skits: TBA Shows: The Powerpuff Girls- Tough Love (11 minutes), Dexter's Laboratory- Sassy Comes Home (11 minutes), Johnny Test- Johnny's New Super Mega Villain (11 minutes), The Amazing World of Gumball- The Flakers (11 minutes)
91	November 6, 2013	Skits: TBA Shows: Camp Lazlo- Lumpy Treasure (11 minutes), The Marvelous Misadventures of Flapjack- That's A Wrap (11 minutes), Courage the Cowardly Dog- The Duck Brothers (11 minutes), The High Fructose Adventures of Annoying Orange- Avocadotar (11 minutes)
92	November 7, 2013	Skits: TBA Shows: Codename: Kids Next Door- Operation: C.A.T.S. (11 minutes), The Powerpuff Girls- Monkey See, Doggie Do (11 minutes), MAD- "S" Cape From Planet Earth, X-Mentalist (11 minutes), Johnny Test- Johnny the Kid (11 minutes)
93	November 8, 2013	Skits: TBA Shows: Courage the Cowardly Dog- Hothead (11 minutes), Dexter's Laboratory- Photo Finish (11 minutes), Camp Lazlo- Tree Hugger (11 minutes), The Amazing World of Gumball- The Bumpkin (11 minutes)
94	November 9, 2013	Skits: TBA Shows: TBA
95	November 10, 2013	Skits: TBA Shows: TBA
96	November 12, 2013	Skits: TBA Shows: TBA
97	November 13, 2013	Skits: TBA Shows: TBA
98	November 14, 2013	Skits: TBA Shows: TBA
99	November 15, 2013	Skits: Flo, Flo, What Do You Know?; Things That Annoy Zorak, Advice from Brak's Sweet Old Mother, Dating Tips with Brak, Brak's Comedy Jokes Shows: Courage the Cowardly Dog—"So in Louvre Are We Two" (11 minutes), Dexter's Laboratory—"LABretto" (11 minutes), Camp Lazlo—"The Big Cheese" (11 minutes), The Amazing World of Gumball—"The Fridge" (11 minutes)
100	November 17, 2013	Skits: What's in My Mouth?, Zorak's Poetry Beat, Dating Tips with Brak, Authentic Bushido Potatoes, Pizza Song Shows: Camp Lazlo—"Irreconcilable Dungferences" (11 minutes), Johnny Bravo—"That's Entertainment!" (11 minutes), The Marvelous Misadventures of Flapjack—"Panfake" (11 minutes), Courage the Cowardly Dog—"Family Business" (11 minutes)
101	November 18, 2013	Skits: Here's a Song About a Little Friend of Mine, Sharing a Joke with My Little Clone, Zorak's Poetry Beat, Brak's Version of the UK National Anthem, Brak's Comedy Jokes Shows: Codename: Kids Next Door—"Operation: R.A.I.N.B.O.W.S." (11 minutes), Courage the Cowardly Dog—"The Revenge of the Chicken from Outer Space" (11 minutes), Johnny Bravo—"The Sensitive Male!" (11 minutes), Camp Lazlo—"The Battle of Pimpleback Mountain" (11 minutes)
102	November 19, 2013	Skits: Brak's Comedy Jokesx2, Beak Brush, Dating Tips with Brak, Things That Annoy Zorak Shows: The Powerpuff Girls—"Boogie Frights" (11 minutes), Dexter's Laboratory—"Dyno-Might" (11 minutes), Johnny Test—"Johnny Unplugged" (11 minutes), The Amazing World of Gumball—"The Remote" (11 minutes)
103	November 20, 2013	Skits: Brak's Complaint Letter, Advice from Brak's Sweet Old Mother, Authentic Bushido Potatoes, Dating Tips with Brak, What's in My Mouth? Shows: Camp Lazlo—"Parasitic Pal" (11 minutes), The Marvelous Misadventures of Flapjack—"Bubbie's Tummy Ache" (11 minutes), Courage the Cowardly Dog—"Courage Meets Bigfoot" (11 minutes), Annoying Orange—"Orange the Red" (11 minutes)
104	November 21, 2013	Skits: Zorak's Poetry Beat, Brak's Comedy Jokes, Plap Chicken Flavor, Advice from Brak's Sweet Old Mother Shows: Codename: Kids Next Door—"Operation: P.I.R.A.T.E." (11 minutes), The Powerpuff Girls—"Stuck Up, up and Away" (11 minutes), MAD—"Reply All/Randy Savage: 9th Grade Wrestler" (11 minutes), Johnny Test—"Johnny Susan, Susan Johnny" (11 minutes)
105	November 22, 2013	Skits: Buster the Bear, Brak's Song Is Interrupted by a Monkey, Make Stuff Happen on the TV, Pizza Song, Clones Shows: Courage the Cowardly Dog—"Dr. Le Quack, Amnesia Specialist" (11 minutes), Dexter's Laboratory—"Lab of the Lost" (7 minutes), Camp Lazlo—"The Wig of Why" (11 minutes), The Amazing World of Gumball—"The Authority" (11 minutes)
106	November 23, 2013	Skits: Flo, Flo, What Do You Know?; Pizza Song, Dating Tips with Brak, Brak's Comedy Jokes, Make Stuff Happen on the TV Shows: Codename: Kids Next Door—"Operation: P.O.P." (11 minutes), The Grim Adventures of Billy & Mandy—"The House of No Tomorrow" (11 minutes), Chowder—"Banned from the Stand" (11 minutes), The High Fructose Adventures of Annoying Orange—"Orange Julius Caesar" (11 minutes)
107	November 24, 2013	Skits: I'm a ..., Dating Tips with Brak, You're the Most ..., Advice from Brak's Sweet Old Mother, Brak's Version of the UK National Anthem, Things That Annoy Zorak Shows: The Powerpuff Girls—"Daylight Savings" (11 minutes), Dexter's Laboratory—"Hamhocks and Armlocks" (11 minutes), The Amazing World of Gumball—"The Picnic" (11 minutes), Foster's Home for Imaginary Friends—"Sight for Sore Eyes" (11 minutes)
108	November 25, 2013	Skits: Brak's Comedy Jokes, Bored, Beak Brush, I'm a ..., Dating Tips with Brak Shows: Codename: Kids Next Door—"Operation: B.U.T.T." (11 minutes), Courage the Cowardly Dog—"The Gods Must Be Goosey" (11 minutes), Johnny Bravo—"Bravo Dooby-Doo" (11 minutes), Camp Lazlo—"Beans & Pranks" (11 minutes)
109	December 2, 2013	Skits: Pizza Song, Zorak's Poetry Beat, Dating Tips with Brak, What's in My Mouth?, Authentic Bushido Potatoes Shows: The Powerpuff Girls—"Beat Your Greens" (11 minutes), Dexter's Laboratory—"Sister Mom" (11 minutes), Johnny Test—"Johnny's Monster Mash" (11 minutes), The Amazing World of Gumball—"The Secret" (11 minutes)
110	December 3, 2013	Skits: "I'm an Eggplant" Song, Brak's Comedy Jokes, Dating Tips with Brak, Brak's Complaint Letter, Plap Shows: Camp Lazlo—"Beans Are from Mars" (11 minutes), The Marvelous Misadventures of Flapjack—"Several Leagues Above the Sea!" (11 minutes), Annoying Orange—"Cereal Killer" (11 minutes), Courage the Cowardly Dog—"1000 Years of Courage" (11 minutes)
111	December 8, 2013	Skits: "Buster the Bear" song, Pizza Song Shows: Codename: Kids Next Door—"Operation: B.U.T.T." (11 minutes), Courage the Cowardly Dog—"The Gods Must Be Goosey" (11 minutes), Camp Lazlo—"Beans & Pranks" (11 minutes) Notes: This episode only showed three shows, and other than the skits shown, was almost an exact replica of Episode #107, which incidentally, showed the Johnny Bravo "Bravo Dooby-Doo" episode.
112	December 16, 2013	Skits: TBA Shows: The Garfield Show—"Caroling Capers" (11 minutes), The Marvelous Misadventures of Flapjack—"Low Tidings" (30 minutes), Courage the Cowardly Dog—"The Nutcracker" (11 minutes) Notes: First time a 30-minute episode airs.
113	December 17, 2013	Skits: TBA Shows: A Johnny Bravo Christmas, Camp Lazlo—"Kamp Kringle" (30 minutes) Note: First time an hour-long episode airs.
114	December 18, 2013	Skits: TBA Shows: Codename: Kids Next Door—"Operation: S.N.O.W.I.N.G." (30 minutes), MAD—"Da Grinchy Code / Duck", Johnny Test—"A Holly Johnny Christmas" (11 minutes)
115	December 19, 2013	Skits: TBA Shows: The Garfield Show—"Turkey Trouble" (11 minutes), Chowder—"Hey Hey, It's Knishmas!" (30 minutes), The Amazing World of Gumball—"Christmas" (11 minutes)
116	December 20, 2013	Skits: TBA Shows: The Grim Adventures of Billy & Mandy—"Billy & Mandy Save Christmas", Courage the Cowardly Dog—"The Snowman Cometh" (11 minutes)
117	December 22, 2013	Skits: TBA Shows: The Grim Adventures of Billy & Mandy—"Billy & Mandy Save Christmas", Courage the Cowardly Dog—"The Nutcracker" (11 minutes)
118	December 23, 2013	Skits: TBA Shows: Ed, Edd n Eddy—"Fa-La-La-La-Ed" (11 minutes), Courage the Cowardly Dog—"Snowman's Revenge" (11 minutes), Codename: Kids Next Door—"Operation: N.A.U.G.H.T.Y." (30 minutes)
119	January 5, 2014	Skits: TBA Shows: Camp Lazlo—"Parent's Day" (11 minutes), The Marvelous Misadventures of Flapjack—"Revenge" (11 minutes), The High Fructose Adventures of Annoying Orange—"Fruiturama" (11 minutes), Courage the Cowardly Dog—"Courage Meets the Mummy" (11 minutes) Notes: Third time Cartoon Planet gets a third season on the same series (revival version).
120	January 11, 2014	Skits: TBA Shows: Codename: Kids Next Door—"Operation: M.U.N.C.H.I.E.S." (11 minutes), The Powerpuff Girls—"Cat Man Do" (11 minutes), MAD—"World War ZZZZ / Shazam and Cat" (11 minutes), Johnny Test—"Johnny's Petting Zoo Posse" (11 minutes)
121	January 12, 2014	Skits: TBA Shows: Courage the Cowardly Dog—"Mega Muriel the Magnificent" (11 minutes), Dexter's Laboratory—"Unfornature Cookie" (11 minutes), Camp Lazlo—"A Job Well Dung" (11 minutes), The Amazing World of Gumball—"The Helmet" (11 minutes)
122	January 18, 2014	Skits: TBA Shows: Codename: Kids Next Door—"Operation: L.U.N.C.H." (11 minutes), Courage the Cowardly Dog—"Bad Hair Day" (11 minutes), Johnny Bravo—"The Time of My Life" (11 minutes), Camp Lazlo—"Waiting for Edward" (11 minutes)
123	January 25, 2014	Skits: TBA Shows: The Powerpuff Girls—"Impeach Fuzz" (11 minutes), Dexter's Laboratory—"Muffin King" (7 minutes), Johnny Test—"Johnny vs. the Dukenator" (11 minutes), The Amazing World of Gumball—"The Internet" (11 minutes)
124	February 8, 2014	Skits: TBA Shows: Codename: Kids Next Door—"Operation: A.F.L.O.A.T." (11 minutes), The Powerpuff Girls—"Mo Job" (11 minutes), MAD—"Doraline / Monster Mashville" (11 minutes), Johnny Test—"99 Deeds of Johnny Test" (11 minutes) Note: Final episode to air on Cartoon Network.
