= Cereal (magazine) =

British biannual travel magazine

- Editor-in-chief: Rosa Park
- Creative director: Rich Stapleton
- Categories: Travel
- Frequency: Biannually
- Total circulation: 30,000 (2015)
- First issue: December 3, 2012; 13 years ago
- Country: United Kingdom
- Based in: Bath, Somerset
- Language: English
- Website: readcereal.com
- ISSN: 2051-3275
- OCLC: 1200488304

Cereal is an independent biannual travel and style magazine based in Bath, Somerset, England. Each issue focuses on a select few destinations, with stories and interviews on design, art and style.

Cereal was founded by Rosa Park (editor-in-chief) and Rich Stapleton (creative director) in 2012 as a quarterly publication. With Volume 9 (2015), Cereal changed to a biannual release schedule, publishing in March and September every year.

Alongside the magazine, Cereal publishes regular digital stories on their website, update online city guides, publish physical city guide books, and publish a number of other books.

== The magazine ==
Cereal is a travel and style magazine aimed primarily at a global audience of design conscious professionals. Each destination the magazine features is visited and personally vetted by the founders Rosa and Rich. All photography and writing is commissioned exclusively by them from a pool of freelance writers and photographers. Alongside destination features, interviews and conversations with designers, architects, artists, and chefs are printed, as well as original essays, short stories and poems.

Volume 10 introduced a series of essays, short stories and poems as a pull-out literary supplement called Weekend, which published writing around a theme, such as Ego or Taste. Since Volume 13, the essays and poems were incorporated into the magazine itself.

Volume 15 (Spring Summer 2018) introduced the format of presenting a unifying theme for the issue as a whole, which, in this instance, was sustainability. This angle ran through many of the interviews, as well as the choice of features and essays. For Volume 16, the theme was collecting. Designers were interviewed on their personal collections, and essays discussed collecting stones, memories and stories.

There have been numerous alterations to the design and layout of the magazine volume to volume, the most conspicuous perhaps being the adoption of the grey front cover from Volume 13 onward. The most recent change was a full redesign of the layout of the magazine by Vancouver-based Studio Faculty for Volume 16.

=== Digital ===
Cereal creates and publishes regular stories specifically for their online site, with exclusive commissioned writing and photography.

=== Other editions ===
Cereal is also published in a Mandarin edition.

== Cereal City Guides ==
In 2016 Cereal launched their City Guide series, with physical guide book editions for London, Paris, New York, Los Angeles, and Copenhagen. Each guide features a selection of places to stay, eat, drink and visit within the city, illustrated by original photography.

In October 2018, new editions for London, Paris and New York were published by Abrams with an expanded 200 page format and new design. An extended selection of recommendations, essays, interviews with notable locals of the city, a weekend itinerary, and souvenir suggestions were also included.

Digital city guides are also available on their website.

== Other publications ==
=== These Islands ===
In 2017 Cereal released their first hardcover, coffee table book titled These Islands: A Portrait of the British Isles. The book focuses on a selection of destinations around the British Isles, exploring each place with photo essays, poems, stories, and writing. Rather than recommending to readers where to stay or what to do, it describes the places in visual, poetic language, as an ode to the destination.

These Islands was edited by Rosa Park, and was written by Richard Aslan, Charlie Lee-Potter, and Lucy Brook. Photography was created by Rich Stapleton, Finn Beales, Jonathan Gregson, and Kate Holstein, while the layout was designed by Studio Faculty. The book was created over a process of three years.

=== Palm ===
Palm is a visual study of Palm Springs, California by Rich Stapleton. It was captured on 35mm black and white film, and focuses on the desert landscapes, mid century modernist architecture, and palm trees of the area as its subject. It was published in September 2017.

=== A Balloon Away ===
A Balloon Away is an illustrated children's novel by Rosa Park, which follows a girl called Sona, a silver balloon, and her new friend Grey the bear, as they travel to destinations around the world. It was published in January 2017.

== Reception ==
Cereal is renowned for its vision, its signature calm and pared-back aesthetic, and its beautiful layout, photography and writing. Stack Magazines described it as "arguably the world's most beautiful travel magazine".
