= Psycho Donuts =

Coordinates: 37.2867°N 121.9495°W

- Interactive map of Psycho Donuts

Restaurant information
- Established: 2009; 17 years ago
- Location: Campbell, California
- Website: www.psychodonuts.com

Psycho Donuts is a donut shop in Campbell, California opened in March 2009. The theme of the shop is "craziness"; it specializes in unusual donut flavors and many of its donuts' names are puns on mental illnesses or other mental health conditions, and the store's decorations include a straitjacket and a padded cell. In 2016, a third location in Santa Clara, California was opened, which along with the second location in Downtown San Jose, has closed. In 2021, a pop up location in the Valley Fair mall opened, which has also since closed.

== Description ==
The shop was opened by Jordan Zweigoron and Kipp Berdianski in March 2009. Berdiansky left the partnership in late July, leaving Zweigoron as the sole owner. In 2014, Web Granger (1971–2019) became the owner of Psycho Donuts.

Psycho Donuts describes itself as a shop that "has taken donuts to the next demented level" and "has taken the neighborhood donut and put it on medication, and given it shock treatment". Its products have unusual toppings such as pretzels and Froot Loops, and many of the donuts' names are puns on mental health conditions—for example, there are donuts called "Bipolar", "Manic Malt", and "Cereal Killer"—although several also have names unrelated to mental illness, such as "Donut Fries", "S'Mores", and "Crispy Critters". Some refer to other serious medical conditions, such as "Massive Head Trauma". The shop's decor also has a psychiatric institution theme: it includes a straitjacket and padded room, an eating area called "Group Therapy", and the staff wear lab coats or nurse uniforms. Zweigoron describes the store's atmosphere as that of a "fun mental institution".

== Controversy ==
The shop has attracted controversy since it was opened in March 2009. Mental health advocates have claimed that the theme of the shop is offensive and perpetuates stereotypes and stigmatization of mentally ill individuals. Organizations including the National Alliance on Mental Illness (NAMI), California's Mental Health Services Oversight and Accountability Commission, and Silicon Valley Independent Living Center called on Psycho Donuts in early April to change the store's name and theme, claiming that negative portrayals of people with mental illnesses create "obstacles" for these people in daily life and can have psychological consequences. Brian Miller of NAMI pointed out that few physical illnesses are subject to the stigma that mental illnesses are, and that a "shop that made fun of cancer" would never be accepted. Author Pete Earley compared the shop's gimmick to the practice of "mak[ing] gay men and lesbians the butt of jokes, as well as blacks, other minorities, and persons who were callously labeled as 'retards, gimps and cripples'". A city council meeting on April 7, 2009, included discussion on whether or not the shop should be forced to change its theme, and protests were held near the shop throughout April and May. Another protest was held on August 2.

On the other hand, the store's owners and supporters have argued that the shop's theme has no malicious intentions and that the store is meant to be fun and unusual. The business also intended to use part of its profits to support the National Alliance for Research on Schizophrenia and Depression, although the organization did not accept the donation. The store's owners and supporters argued that Psycho Donuts has a First Amendment right (specifically, the right to free speech) to choose the name of their business and products. Finally, some people have argued that mental health advocates should worry about larger issues instead of "going after" such a small business, and that the controversy over the store would cause people to "not take mental health issues seriously".

In May 2009, a workshop on mental health issues was held in Campbell; people attending the workshop credited the Psycho Donut controversy with raising the visibility of mental health issues and prompting the workshop.

In late August that year Zweigoron, having become the sole owner of the shop, announced that he would remove the straitjacket and padded cell from the shop's interior, and changed the name of two donuts on the menu, "Bipolar" (changed to "Mood Swing") and "Massive Head Trauma" ("Headbanger").

In June 2013, Psycho Donuts again attracted controversy with the Foie Bomb, a foie gras donut, which it gave away free on National Donut Day because of a California anti-animal cruelty law forbidding the sale of foie gras. Ron Levi, the head chef, came up with the idea together with Charlie Ayers, former head chef at Google.

== Donut Showdown ==
In 2013, Psycho Donuts' head chef Ron Levi, assisted by Joe Cloutier, won first place in Food Network Canada's Donut Showdown.

== See also ==
- Heart Attack Grill
