= Seriality (gender studies) =

Feminist term

Seriality, or serial collectivity, is a term that was used by the feminist scholar Iris Marion Young to describe a reconceptualization of the category of woman in her 1994 essay Gender as Seriality. Young borrowed the concept of seriality from Jean-Paul Sartre's Critique of Dialectical Reason, where he originally developed the idea to describe the relationship of individuals to social classes and the capitalist system of production and consumption. Understanding women as a series, rather than a group, entails the recognition that the category woman is not defined by any common biological or psychological characteristics; rather, individuals are positioned as woman by a set of material and immaterial social constructs that are the product of previous human actions.

== Group vs series ==
A group, in Jean-Paul Sartre's definition, is a collection of people who self-consciously recognize themselves to be in a unified relationship with each other in the undertaking of a common project. A mutual acknowledgment of actively-shared goals is the chief feature of a group. Guilds, reading groups, addiction support groups and animal cruelty prevention groups are all examples of groups.

Seriality, in contrast to the active effort of group being, describes a level of social existence that is habitually constrained and directed by existing circumstances and material conditions.

In a series, a collection of people are unified passively by objects, routines, practices, and habits around which their actions are oriented. For instance, people waiting in line for a bus, radio listeners, prison inmates and street theatre spectators are all examples of series. In each example, individuals are oriented toward the same goals by their response to existing conditions and structures in the environment, which are the collective legacy of human actions and decisions in the past. To illustrate concretely, the actions of people who stop and watch a street theatre performance may be shaped by existing conditions that constrain and permit their actions, such as the social acceptability of staging a performance on the street, the attractive costumes of the performers, high unemployment rates among actors, the existence of a public square, social expectations of their roles as spectators.

Members of a series are anonymous and isolated but not alone; individuals in a series often take into account the expected behavior of other members when in pursuing their own actions. For instance, a bus rider may choose to avoid rush hour traffic. Members of a series are also interchangeable, although not identical, in relation to the objects that effect their serialized condition. From the point of view of a radio program broadcaster, one listener is interchangeable with another.

Groups and series are related in that groups arise out of a backdrop of seriality and disperse to fall back into serialized conditions. In other words, groups are the product of individuals' response to shared conditions. Young gives the example of commuters at a bus stop who, when the bus fails to appear, organize themselves into a group to hail taxis, complain to the bus company, etc.

== As solution to conceptual dilemma in feminism ==
Young's reconceptualization of women as a series is an attempt to provide a solution to the problems in feminist discourse surrounding the grouping of all women in a single category. The problem exists as a dilemma between two conflicting positions:

i) On one hand, it is important to be able to speak of women as a group for practical political reasons. Feminist politics is organized around this category of woman; its existence as a movement fundamentally depends on this conceptualization. Additionally, the category of women is necessary to understand oppression and disadvantage as something that is systematically inflicted upon women (or any societal group) in a structured, institutionalized process, as opposed to being a natural or unique condition.

ii) On the other hand, the category of woman is fraught with problems of essentialization, normalization, and exclusion. As Elizabeth Spelman points out, social categories are constructs and carry latent expressions of privilege and subordination; in that manner, feminist theories have often assumed the experience of white middle-class heterosexual women as representative for all women and exclude less privileged points of view. Chandra Mohanty suggests that the category of woman creates the false impression of a coherent homogeneous group, which leads to the mistake of assuming that all women are equally powerless and oppressed, rather than generating specific questions about oppression that can be empirically investigated. Judith Butler goes as far as to argue that the very act of defining such a gender category is what produces the normalizations that privilege some viewpoints and exclude others.

Thinking of woman as a series solves those conceptual problems. It allows one to meaningfully use the category while avoiding the mistake of falsely essentializing women as a group. An essentialist approach attempts to define woman by common biological characteristics, which is evidently false when one considers, for instance, transgender, bigender or intersex people, or by finding commonality in the vast diversity of women's actual lives, which is clearly not a viable enterprise.

A serial conception of woman also disconnects the idea of gender from an individual's personal identity, as it defines gender as a pre-existing set of societal forces that are visited upon each individual; the approach does not make any claims about the way that individuals respond to those pressures. Indeed, the conception of gender as seriality derives its strength from precisely the fact that it does not attempt a comprehensive definition of the individual, but it acknowledges that individuals exist within structures that constrain and channel their actions in particular ways.

== Other potential applications ==
Iris Marion Young suggested that the concept of seriality might also be usefully applied to relationships of race or nationality as linkages, which also result from historical conditions such as the institution of slavery and projects of nation-building and function to limit and enable individuals' actions on the level of everyday life and habit.

== See also ==
- Woman
- Gender
- Social constructionism
- Feminism
- Feminist theory
- Third-wave feminism
- Gender studies
- Women's studies
