= Cereal (disambiguation) =

Cereals are grasses cultivated for the edible components of their grain.

Cereal may also refer to:

- Breakfast cereal, grain-based foods
- Cereals and pseudocereals collectively
- an adjective referring to the goddess Ceres
- Caryopsis
- Food grain
- Cereal (magazine), a UK travel and style magazine
- Cereal, Alberta, Canada
- "Cereal" (The Apprentice), a 2024 television episode
- "Cereal," an episode from the 20th season of Arthur

== See also ==
- Cereals Event which takes place in the UK
- Cerean (disambiguation)
- Ceres (dwarf planet)
- Serial (disambiguation)
