= Syrian Christians =

Syrian Christians may refer to

- Adherents of Christianity in Syria
- Adherents of Syriac Christianity, various Christian bodies of Syriac traditions
  - Saint Thomas Christians, Christians of Syriac tradition in India, also called Syrians or Nasrani
  - Knanaya people, Christians of Syriac tradition in India, who are descended from 4th century Syrian migrants to India.

== See also ==
- Patriarchate of Antioch (disambiguation)
- Syrian Catholic (disambiguation)
- Syriac Orthodox Church
- Syria (disambiguation)
