= Syrian Catholic =

Syrian Catholic may refer to:

- The Catholic Church in Syria, part of the worldwide Catholic Church in the country of Syria
- The Syriac Catholic Church, one of 23 Eastern Catholic Churches, that uses the West Syriac liturgy and has many practices and rites in common with the Syriac Orthodox Church.

== See also ==
- Syrian (disambiguation)
- Catholic (disambiguation)
- Catholic Syrian Bank, an Indian bank
- Syriac Christianity
