= Serial Killers Ink =

Website selling murder memorabilia

serialkillersink
- Website type: True Crime Collectibles
- Dissolved: April 10, 2024
- Owner: Eric Holler
- Creator: Eric Holler
- Registration: Optional
- Launched: December 1, 2008

Serial Killers Ink was a website dedicated to selling "murderabilia" (collectibles related to murders, murderers or other violent crimes) and serial killer art, interviewing convicted serial killers and also serves as a meeting place for those interested or involved in the murderabilia industry. The website was described by true crime author and Investigation Discovery personality David Lohr, who is currently a writer and journalist for AOL News, as "One of the top selling murderabilia outlets".

== History ==
Founder Eric Holler, who uses the pen name "Eric Gein" (an homage to Ed Gein according to a New York Times article) came up with the concept of Serial Killers Ink in the mid-1990s after he began writing to inmates and collecting their artwork and craft items. A friend of Holler's suggested he list items on eBay and offer them for sale. eBay banned the sale of murderabilia in 2001. In 2006, Holler began writing and corresponding with inmates once again in preparation of building a new website. In December 2008, the website launched and in February 2009, the website was redesigned to include a store to sell art, letters, hair and clothing obtained from infamous and news-worthy inmates.

Eric Holler and Serial Killers Ink were featured in the season 9 premier of the National Geographic Channel television series Taboo titled "Living with the Dead" which originally aired June 17, 2012.

== Controversy ==
The large amount of media coverage sparked outrage and in June 2010, Senators John Cornyn of Texas and Amy Klobuchar of Minnesota teamed up to introduce a bill in the United States Congress that would outlaw the trade. The bill is called the "Stop the Sale of Murderabilia to Protect the Dignity of Crime Victims Act of 2010," and comes after several individual fights over the issue. Holler is an opponent of the bill and has enlisted the help of the ACLU to help combat the bill as an anti-civil liberties bill. The Texas Tribune first reported that the proposed bill in early June 2010 included a statement in defense of the industry from Holler.

== See also ==
- Investigation Discovery
