= Serial =

Serial may refer to:

== Arts, entertainment, and media ==
=== The presentation of works in sequential segments ===
- Serial (literature), serialised literature in print
- Serial (publishing), periodical publications and newspapers
- Serial (radio and television), series of radio and television programs that rely on a continuing plot
- Serial film, a series of short subjects, with a continuing story, originally shown in theaters, in conjunction with feature films, particularly in the 1930s and 1940s
- Indian serial, a type of Indian television program

=== Other uses in arts, entertainment, and media ===
- Serial (1980 film), based on McFadden's novel, starring Martin Mull and Tuesday Weld
- Serial (podcast), a podcast spinoff of radio series This American Life
- The Serial: A Year in the Life of Marin County, a 1977 novel by Cyra McFadden

== Computing and technology ==
- SerDes, a Serializer/Deserializer (pronounced sir-deez)
- Serial ATA
- Serial attached SCSI
- Serial bus, e.g.,
  - I²C
  - 1-Wire
  - Serial Peripheral Interface Bus (SPI)
  - UNI/O
- Serial cable, a cable used to transfer information between two devices using a serial communication protocol
- Serial computer, a computer typified by its bit-serial architecture
  - Bit-serial architecture, a 1-bit processor or CPU architecture with a 1-bit instruction set and microarchitecture
- Serial communication, the process of sending data one bit at a time, sequentially, over a communication channel or computer bus
  - Asynchronous serial communication
  - Synchronous serial communication
- Serial port
- Serial SCSI, serial SCSI disk-drives
- Universal Serial Bus, also known as USB

== Other uses ==
- Serial code or serial number
- Serial comma
- Serial killer
- Serial relation in mathematics, a binary relation R that relates every x to some y

== See also ==
- Cereal (disambiguation) (a homophone)
- Serialism (philosophy)
- Serialism, in music
- Series (disambiguation)
