= Niranam poets =

Group of poets

The Niranam poets, also known as the Kannassan poets, were three poets from the same family by the names of Madhava Panikkar, Sankara Panikkar, and Rama Panikkar. They hailed from Niranam, a small village in southern Kerala, India, near the town of Thiruvalla. Their works mainly comprised translation and adaptation of Sanskrit epics and Puranic works and were for devotional purposes. They lived between 1350 and 1450 C.E.

It is believed that they all belonged to the same Kannassa family and that Madhava Panikkar and Sankara Panikkar were the uncles of Rama Panikkar, the youngest of the three.

As Kannassa, they were probably Nair Panikkers or members of the Kaniyar caste, which makes their claim to mastery of Sanskrit a significant feature as Kaniyar, being adept in Astrology and Ayurveda, they were accepted by then the Kings

Their works have been mostly assigned to the Pattu taxon. It revived the Bhakti school of literature and reasserted the seriousness of the poetic vocation in the place of the excessive sensuality and eroticism of the Manipravalam poets. Divergence from the Manipravalam school, through non-usage of Dravidian metre and Sanskrit grammatical forms, are noted.

Madhava Panikkar's Bhasha Bhagavadgita, a condensed Malayalam translation of Bhagavad Gita was its first translation into any modern Indian language. Sankara Panikkar's main work is Bharatamala, a masterly condensation of Mahabharata. Perhaps the most important was Rama Panikkar, who is the author of Ramayanam, Bharatam, Bhagavatam, and Sivarathri Mahatmyam. Kannassa Ramayanam and Kannassa Bharatam are the most important of these Niranam works. The former is an important link between Cheeraman's Ramacharitam, Ayyappilli Asan's Ramakathapattu and Ezhuthachan's Adhyathmaramayanam. Ulloor has said that Rama Panikkar holds the same position in Malayalam literature that Edmund Spenser has in English literature.
