= Syrian (disambiguation) =

Syrian people or Syrians are the majority inhabitants or citizens of Syria.

Syrian may also refer to:

== People ==
- Syrian diaspora, Syrian emigrants and their descendants living outside of Syria, as either immigrants or refugees
- Native inhabitants of the historical region of Syria
- Adherents of Syriac Christianity
- Assyrian people, an ethnic group indigenous to Assyria, in the Middle East
- Arameans, an ancient Semitic-speaking people formerly in the Near East
- Leucosyri, 'White Syrians', an ancient ethnic group in Anatolia

=== Individuals ===
- Ephrem the Syrian (306–373), prominent Christian theologian and writer
- Michael the Syrian (died 1199), a patriarch of the Syriac Orthodox Church from 1166 to 1199
- Rezon the Syrian, an enemy of King Solomon mentioned in 1 Kings

== Other uses ==
- Syrian (band), an Italian synthpop band
- Syrian (horse) or Arabian horse, a breed of horse
- Syrian Airlines, a Syrian airline

== See also ==
- Syrian language (disambiguation)
- Syrian Catholic (disambiguation)
- Syria (disambiguation)
- Syriac (disambiguation)
- Assyrian (disambiguation)
- Sirian (disambiguation)
- Cerean (disambiguation)
- Syrian Arabic, Arabic varieties spoken in Syria
- Levantine Arabic, a sprachbund of modern spoken Arabic in the Levant
