= Malabar District =

Administrative district of Bombay and later Madras from 1792 to 1956

- District of Madras Presidency
- 1792–1957
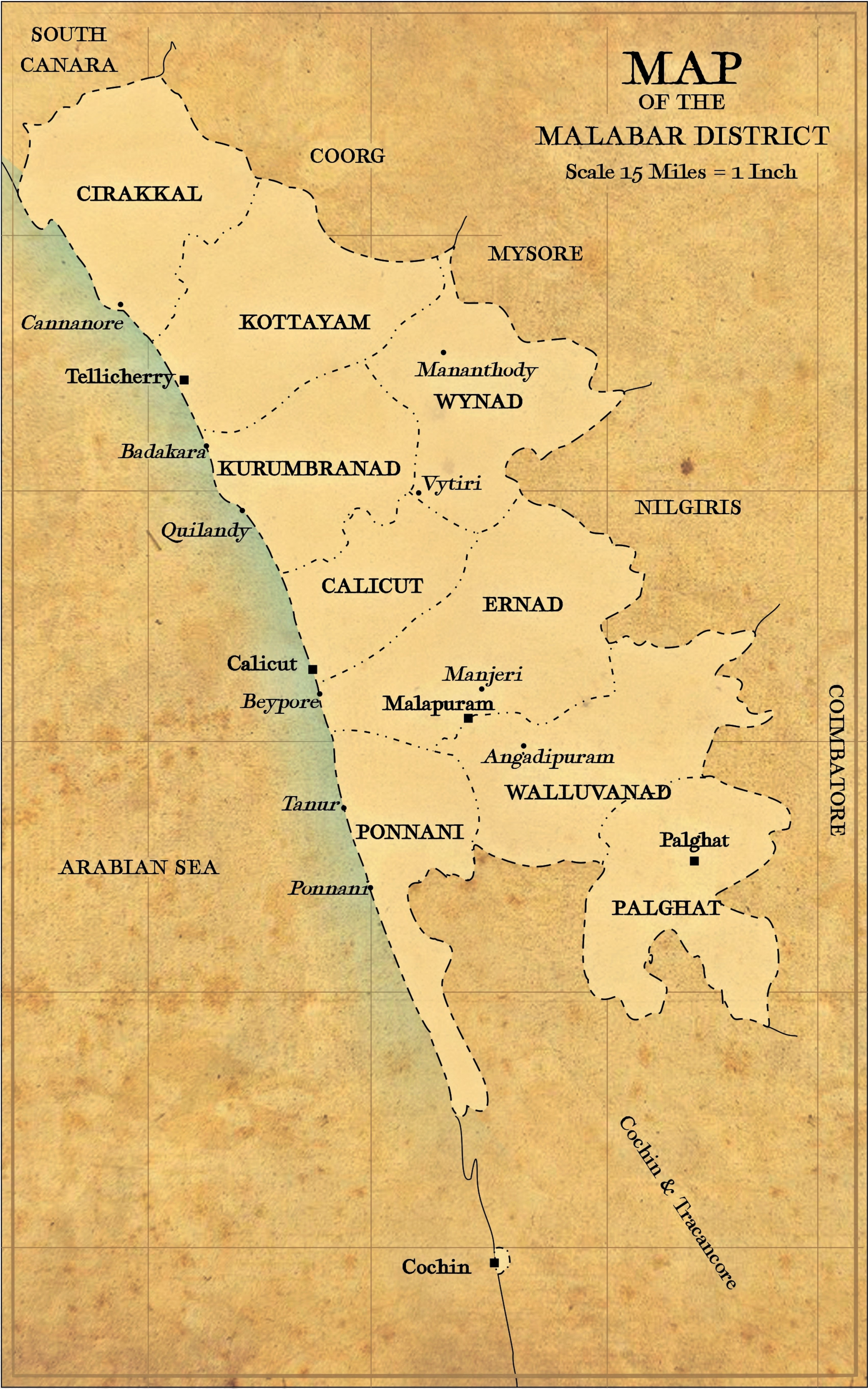
- Malabar District with revenue divisions and taluks
- Capital: Kozhikode
- Area
  - 1951: 15,027 km^{2} (5,802 sq mi)
- Population
  - 1951: 4,758,842
- Government
- District collector
- History
  - Territories ceded by Tipu Sultan attached to Bombay Presidency: 1792
  - Divided into North Malabar and South Malabar: 1793
  - Attached to Madras Presidency: 1800
  - Reorganisation of Taluks: 1860
  - Transferred Gudalur and Pandalur to Nilgiris: 1877
  - Became part of Madras State: 1950
  - Kasaragod was added and became part of Kerala: 1956
  - Laccadive and Minicoy Islands separated to form Union Territory of Lakshadweep: 1956
  - Divided the three districts of Kozhikode, Palakkad, and Kannur: 1 January 1957
Preceded by
Dutch Malabar
Zamorin of Calicut
Arakkal kingdom
Kingdom of Mysore
Succeeded by
Kasaragod district
Kannur district
Wayanad district
Kozhikode district
Nilagiri district
Malappuram district
Palakkad district
Thrissur district
Ernakulam district
Lakshadweep
Tangasseri
Anchuthengu

Malabar District, or Malabar, also known as British Malabar was an administrative district on the southwestern Malabar Coast of Bombay Presidency (1792–1800), Madras Presidency (1800–1950) and finally, Madras State (1950–1956) in India. It was the most populous and the third-largest district in the erstwhile Madras State. It was sub-divided into two divisions South Malabar and North Malabar, the historic town of Kozhikode of South Malabar region was the administrative headquarters of this district.

The district included the present-day districts of Kannur, Kozhikode, Wayanad, Malappuram, Palakkad northern and central parts of present Kerala state, the Lakshadweep Islands, and a major portion of the Nilgiris district in modern-day Tamil Nadu. The detached settlements of Tangasseri and Anchuthengu, which were British colonies within the kingdom of Travancore in southern Kerala, also formed part of Malabar District until 1927.

Malayalam was the administrative as well as the most spoken lingua franca of Malabar district. Jeseri, a distinct dialect of Malayalam, was spoken in the Laccadive Islands. Malabar District merged with the erstwhile state of Travancore-Cochin (1950–1956) to form Kerala according to the States Reorganisation Act, 1956. On the same day, the present Kasaragod district of South Canara District was also attached to Malabar, and the Laccadive and Minicoy Islands of Malabar were reorganised to form a new Union Territory. Malabar was trifurcated to form the districts of Kannur, Kozhikode, and Palakkad on 1 January 1957.

The city of Kozhikode was the capital of Malabar. Malabar was divided into North Malabar and South Malabar in 1793 for administrative convenience, with their regional headquarters at Thalassery and Cherpulassery (Later changed to Ottapalam) respectively. During the British rule, Malabar's chief importance lay in its production of Malabar pepper, coconut, and tiles. In the old administrative records of the Madras Presidency, it is recorded that the most remarkable plantation owned by Government in the erstwhile Madras Presidency was the Teak plantation at Nilambur planted in 1844. The District of Malabar and the ports at Beypore and Fort Kochi had some sort of importance in the erstwhile Madras Presidency as it was one of the two districts of the Presidency that lies on the Western Malabar Coast, thus accessing the marine route through Arabian Sea. The first railway line of Kerala from Tirur to Beypore in 1861 was laid for it. The work Malabar Manual (1887) authored by William Logan in two volumes explains the characteristics of Malabar.

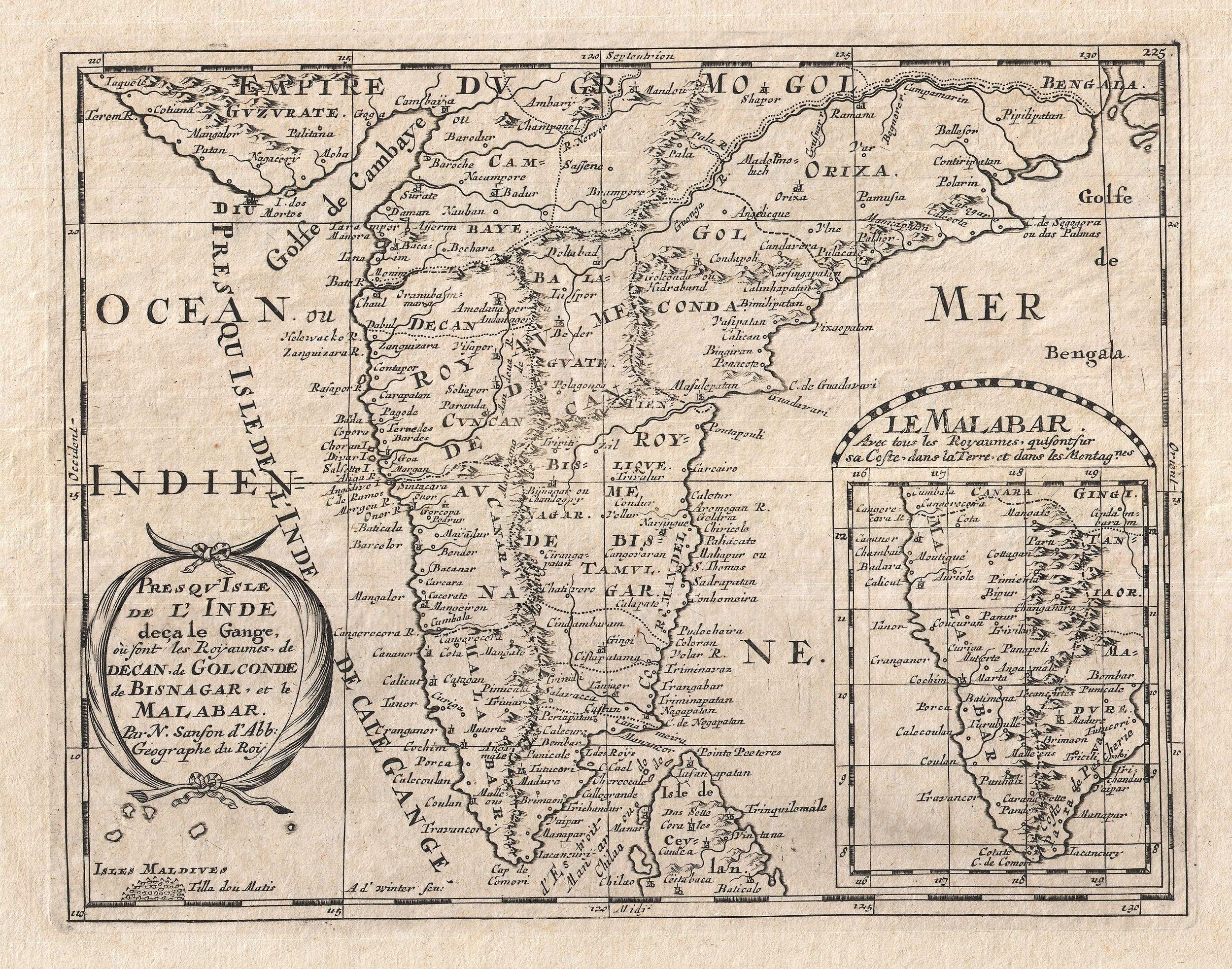
A 1652 Map of India (Malabar is highlighted separately on the right side)

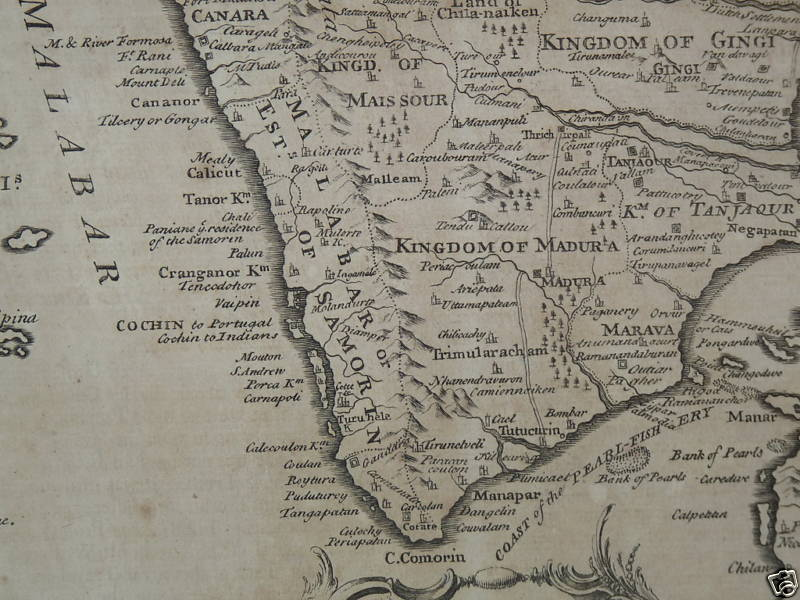
A 1744 map of Malabar Coast

The district lay between the Arabian Sea on the west, South Canara District on the north, the Western Ghats (the princely states of Coorg and Mysore, and Nilgiris and Coimbatore districts) to the east, and the princely state of Cochin to the south. The district covered an area of 15,027 square kilometres (5,802 sq mi), and extended 233 km (145 mi) along the coast and 40–120 kilometers (25–75 miles) inland.

All the major pre-independence political parties of Kerala such as the INC and CPI started their functioning in Kerala at Malabar District as a part of the freedom struggle. KPCC was formed in 1921 at Ottapalam, on the bank of river Bharathappuzha. In July 1937, a clandestine meeting of the CSP, which was the political party formed by socialists of Congress, was held at Calicut. The CPI in Kerala was formed on 31 December 1939 with the Pinarayi Conference, held near Thalassery. It was the erstwhile leaders of Congress Socialist Party, such as P. Krishna Pillai, K. Damodaran, E. M. S. Namboodiripad, who formed the CPI branch in Kerala. The Indian Union Muslim League was also formed in the 1930s, on a meeting held at Thalassery.

== Etymology ==
Until the arrival of British, the term Malabar was used in foreign trade circles as a general name for Kerala. Earlier, the term Malabar had also been used to denote Tulu Nadu and Kanyakumari which lie contiguous to Kerala in the southwestern coast of India, in addition to the modern state of Kerala. The people of Malabar were known as Malabars. Still the term Malabar is often used to denote the entire southwestern coast of India. From the time of Cosmas Indicopleustes (6th century CE) itself, the Arab sailors used to call Kerala as Male. The first element of the name, however, is attested already in the Topography written by Cosmas Indicopleustes. This mentions a pepper emporium called Male, which clearly gave its name to Malabar ('the country of Male'). The name Male is thought to come from the Dravidian word Mala ('hill'). Al-Biruni (AD 973 – 1048) must have been the first writer to call this state Malabar. Authors such as Ibn Khordadbeh and Al-Baladhuri mention Malabar ports in their works. The Arab writers had called this place Malibar, Manibar, Mulibar, and Munibar. Malabar is reminiscent of the word Malanad which means the land of hills. According to William Logan, the word Malabar comes from a combination of the Dravidian word Mala (hill) and the Persian/Arabic word Barr (country/continent).

== History ==
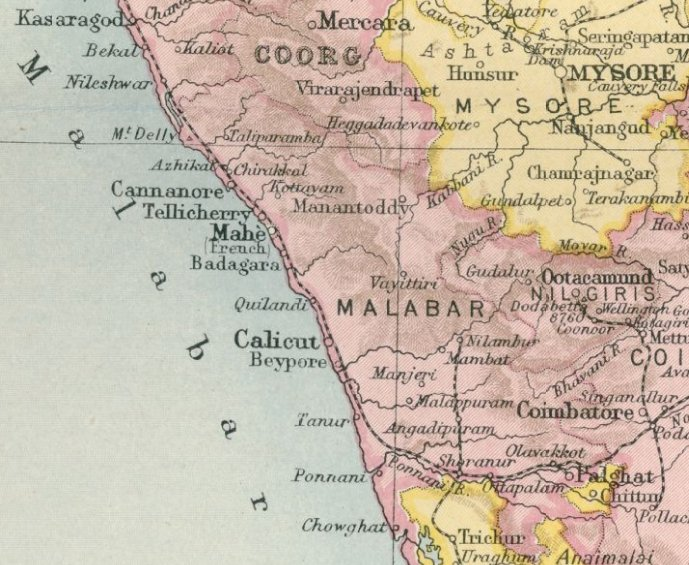
Important towns in the erstwhile Malabar District

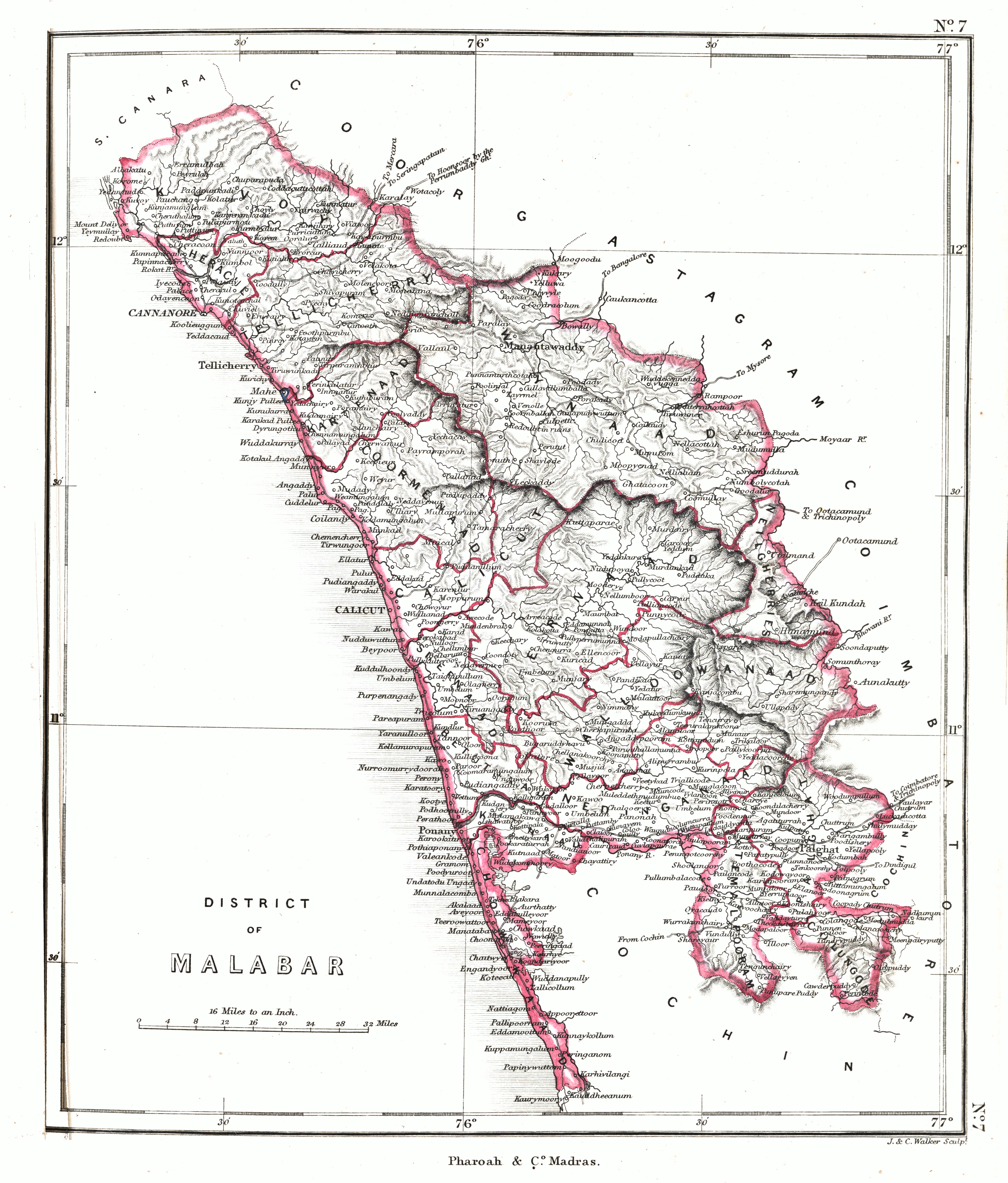
An old map of Malabar District (1854). Note that the taluks Pandalur, Gudalur, and Kundah in present-day Nilgiris district were parts of Wayanad Taluk in 1854. The Taluks of Malabar were rearranged in 1860 and 1877.

=== South Malabar ===
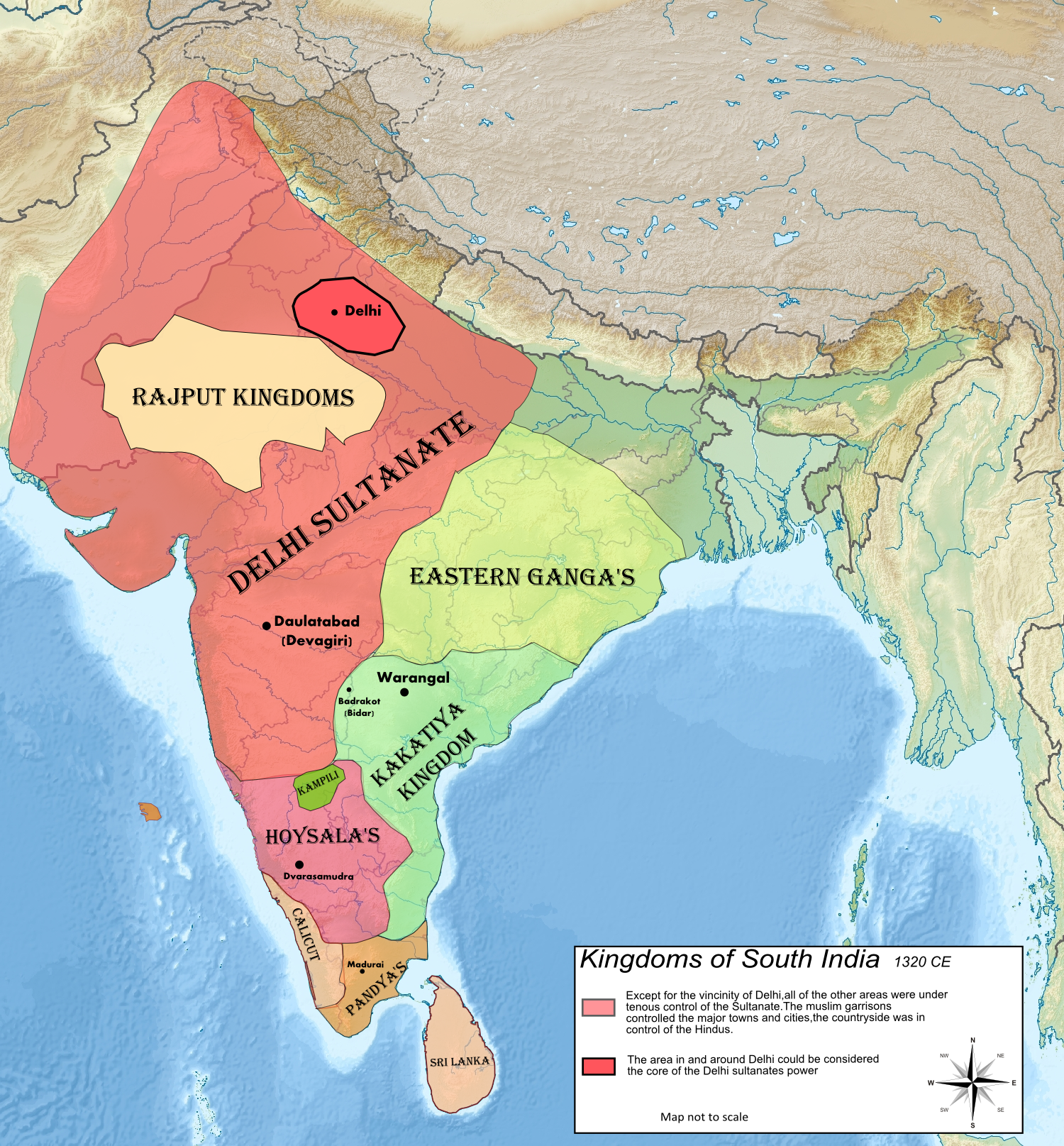
India in early 1320 CE. Note that most of the parts of present-day state of Kerala was under the influence of the Zamorin of Kozhikode.

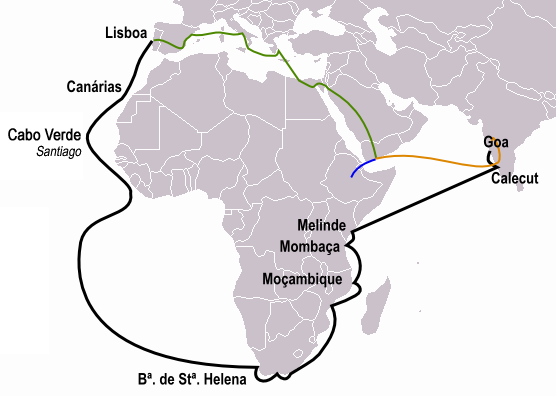
The path Vasco da Gama took to reach Kozhikode (black line) in 1498, which was also the discovery of a sea route from Europe to India, and eventually paved way for the European colonisation of Indian subcontinent. At that time, the Zamorin of Kozhikode was residing at Ponnani

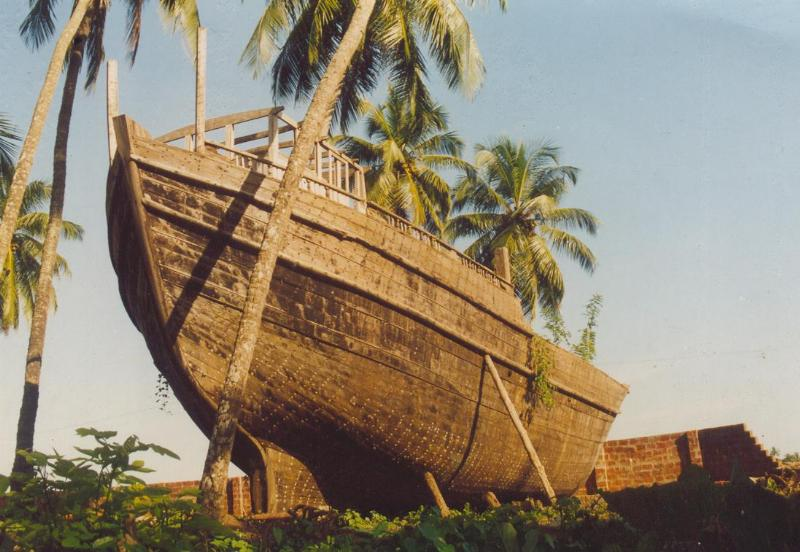
Uru, a type of ship built at Beypore, Calicut

==== Ancient era ====
The ancient maritime port of Tyndis, which was then a centre of trade with Ancient Rome, is roughly identified with Ponnani, Tanur, and Kadalundi-Vallikkunnu. Tyndis was a major center of trade, next only to Muziris, between the Cheras and the Roman Empire. The River Bharathappuzha (River Ponnani) had importance since Sangam period (1st–4th century CE), due to the presence of Palakkad Gap which connected the Malabar coast with Coromandel coast through inland.

Pliny the Elder (1st century CE) states that the port of Tyndis was located at the northwestern border of Keprobotos (Chera dynasty). The North Malabar region, which lies north of the port at Tyndis, was ruled by the kingdom of Ezhimala during Sangam period. According to the Periplus of the Erythraean Sea, a region known as Limyrike began at Naura and Tyndis. However the Ptolemy mentions only Tyndis as the Limyrike's starting point. The region probably ended at Kanyakumari; it thus roughly corresponds to the present-day Malabar Coast. The value of Rome's annual trade with the region was estimated at around 50,000,000 sesterces. Pliny the Elder mentioned that Limyrike was prone by pirates. The Cosmas Indicopleustes mentioned that the Limyrike was a source of peppers.

==== Early Middle Ages ====
Three inscriptions, that date back to 932 CE and found from Triprangode (near Tirunavaya), Kottakkal, and Chaliyar, mention the name of Goda Ravi of Chera dynasty. The Triprangode inscription states the agreement of Thavanur. Several inscriptions written in Old Malayalam dating back to the 10th century CE and found in Sukapuram near Edappal, which was one of the 64 old Nambudiri villages of Kerala. Descriptions about the rulers of Eranad and Valluvanad regions can be seen in the Jewish copper plates of Bhaskara Ravi Varman (around 1000 CE) and Viraraghava copper plates of Veera Raghava Chakravarthy (around 1225 CE). Eranad was ruled by a Samanthan Nair clan known as Eradis, similar to the Vellodis of neighbouring Valluvanad and Nedungadis of Nedunganad. The rulers of Valluvanad were known by the title Eralppad/Eradi. It was the ruler of Eranad who later became the Zamorin of Calicut by annexing the port town of Calicut from Polanad, which was vassal to Kolathunadu. The ruler of Kingdom of Cochin also traces back to Ponnani in South Malabar. South Malabar was also the seat of the kingdoms of Parappanad, Vettathunadu, Valluvanadu, Nedungadis, and Palakkad. Parappanad royal family is a cousin dynasty of the Travancore royal family. The Azhvanchery Thamprakkal were the feudal lords of Athavanad. Tirunavaya, the seat of Mamankam festival, lies on the bank of the river Bharathappuzha.

==== Rise of Kozhikode ====
In the 14th century, Kozhikode conquered larger parts of central Kerala after the seize of Tirunavaya region from Valluvanad, which were under the control of the king of Perumbadappu Swaroopam (Cochin). The ruler of Perumpadappu was forced to shift his capital (c. CE 1405) further south from Kodungallur to Kochi. In the 15th century, the status of Cochin was reduced to a vassal state of Kozhikode, thus leading to the emergence of Kozhikode as the most powerful kingdom in medieval Malabar Coast.

During the 15th century Kalaripayattu was important in the history of Malabar, where some warriors lived, most notably puthooram veetil Aromal Chekavar and his sister Unniyarcha, chieftains of martial arts. Kozhikode was the largest city in the Indian state of Kerala under the rule of Zamorin of Calicut, an independent kingdom based at Kozhikode. It remained so until the 18th century CE. The port at Kozhikode was the gateway to South Indian coast for the Arabs, the Portuguese, the Dutch, and finally the British. The Kunjali Marakkars, who were the naval chief of the Zamorin of Kozhikode, are credited with organizing the first naval defense of the Indian coast. Under British Raj, Kozhikode became the headquarters of Malabar District, one of the two districts in the western coast of erstwhile Madras Presidency. The port at Kozhikode held the superior economic and political position in medieval Kerala coast, while Kannur, Kollam, and Kochi, were commercially important secondary ports, where the traders from various parts of the world would gather. The Portuguese arrived at Kappad Kozhikode in 1498 during the Age of Discovery, thus opening a direct sea route from Europe to South Asia. Kallingal Madathil Rarichan Moopan and Pullambil Sankaran Moopan and Vamala Moopan families were very prominent among those who said that two centuries ago, some Jenmis in Kozhikode were engaged in sea trade and shipping.

At the peak of their reign, the Zamorins of Kozhikode ruled over a region from Kollam (Quilon) in the south to Panthalayini Kollam (Koyilandy) in the north. They were the most powerful rulers on Malabar Coast and Kozhikode was the largest city of Kerala until the Portuguese era. The Zamorin of Calicut, who was originally the ruler of Eranad based at Nediyiruppu, developed the port at Kozhikode and changed his headquarters to there for maritime trade. Ibn Battuta (1342–1347), who visited the city of Kozhikode six times, gives the earliest glimpses of life in the city. He describes Kozhikode as "one of the great ports of the district of Malabar" where "merchants of all parts of the world are found". The king of this place, he says, "shaves his chin just as the Haidari Fakeers of Rome do... The greater part of the Muslim merchants of this place are so wealthy that one of them can purchase the whole freightage of such vessels put here and fit-out others like them". Ma Huan (1403 AD), the Chinese sailor part of the Imperial Chinese fleet under Cheng Ho (Zheng He) states the city as a great emporium of trade frequented by merchants from around the world. He makes note of the 20 or 30 mosques built to cater to the religious needs of the Muslims, the unique system of calculation by the merchants using their fingers and toes (followed to this day), and the matrilineal system of succession. Abdur Razzak (1442–43), Niccolò de' Conti (1445), Afanasy Nikitin (1468–74), Ludovico di Varthema (1503–1508), and Duarte Barbosa witnessed the city as one of the major trading centres in the Indian subcontinent where traders from different parts of the world could be seen.

The Kingdom of Cochin used to adopt members from Kingdom of Tanur in the medieval period. Being home to the prominent figures like Thunchaththu Ezhuthachan, Poonthanam Nambudiri, Melpathur Narayana Bhattathiri, Kunchan Nambiar, and Zainuddin Makhdoom II, South Malabar was the cultural capital of medieval Kerala. The Kerala school of astronomy and mathematics flourished between the 14th and 16th centuries. In attempting to solve astronomical problems, the Kerala school independently created a number of important mathematics concepts, including series expansion for trigonometric functions. The Kerala School of Astronomy and Mathematics was based at Vettathunadu (Tirur region) of South Malabar.

Kozhikode, Tanur, and Ponnani were the three major port cities in South Malabar region, while the minor trading ports included Beypore, Parappanangadi, and Chaliyam. The coastal Kingdom of Tanur, the Kingdom of Valluvanad in inland, and Palakkad in the hilly region formed other major kingdoms in South Malabar region in the medieval period. Marthanda Varma, the founder of Travancore, belongs to Parappanad royal family. In 1664, the municipality of Fort Kochi was established by Dutch Malabar, making it the first municipality in Indian subcontinent, which got dissolved when the Dutch authority got weaker in the 18th century.

=== North Malabar ===
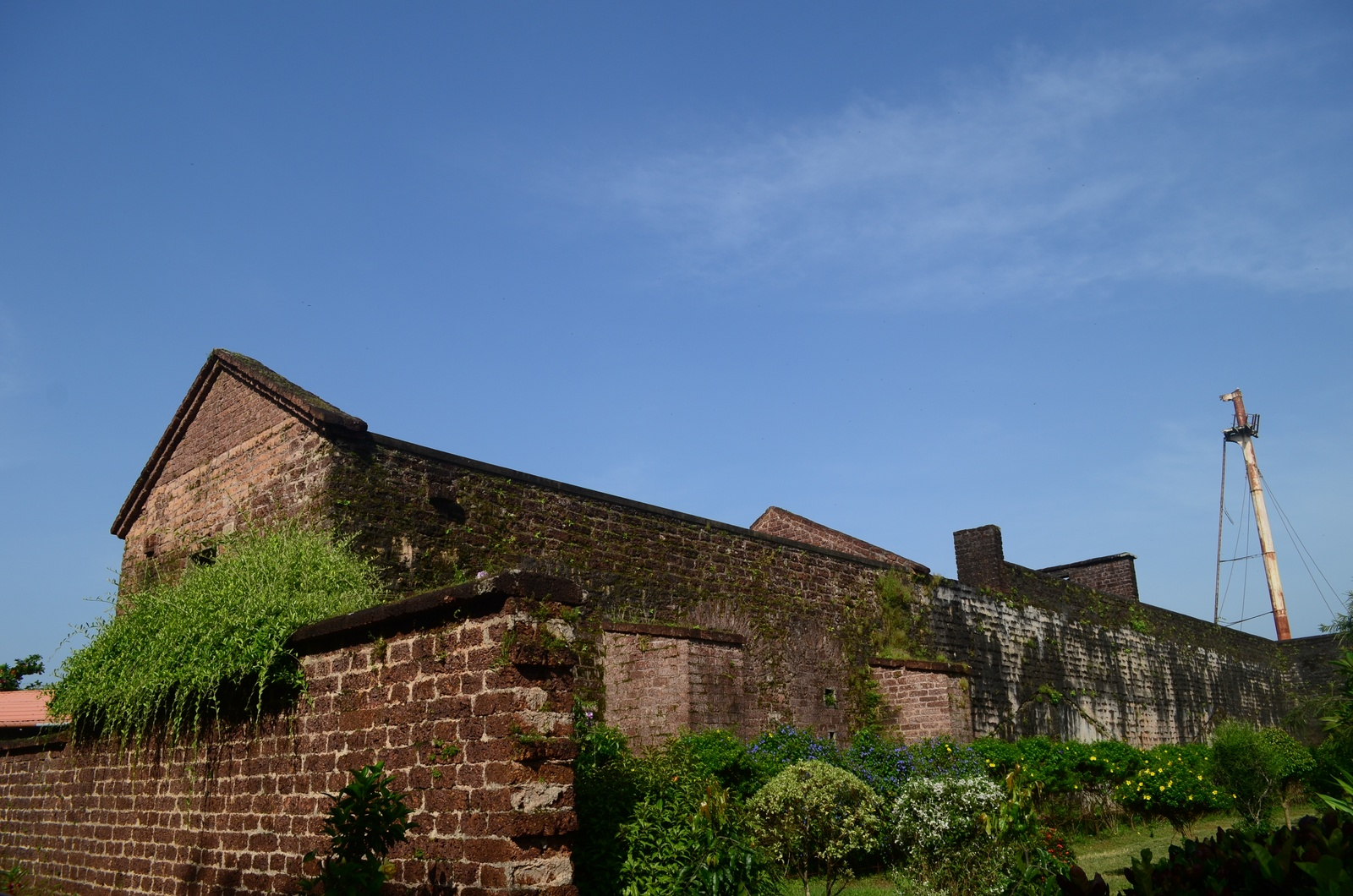
St. Angelo Fort at Kannur

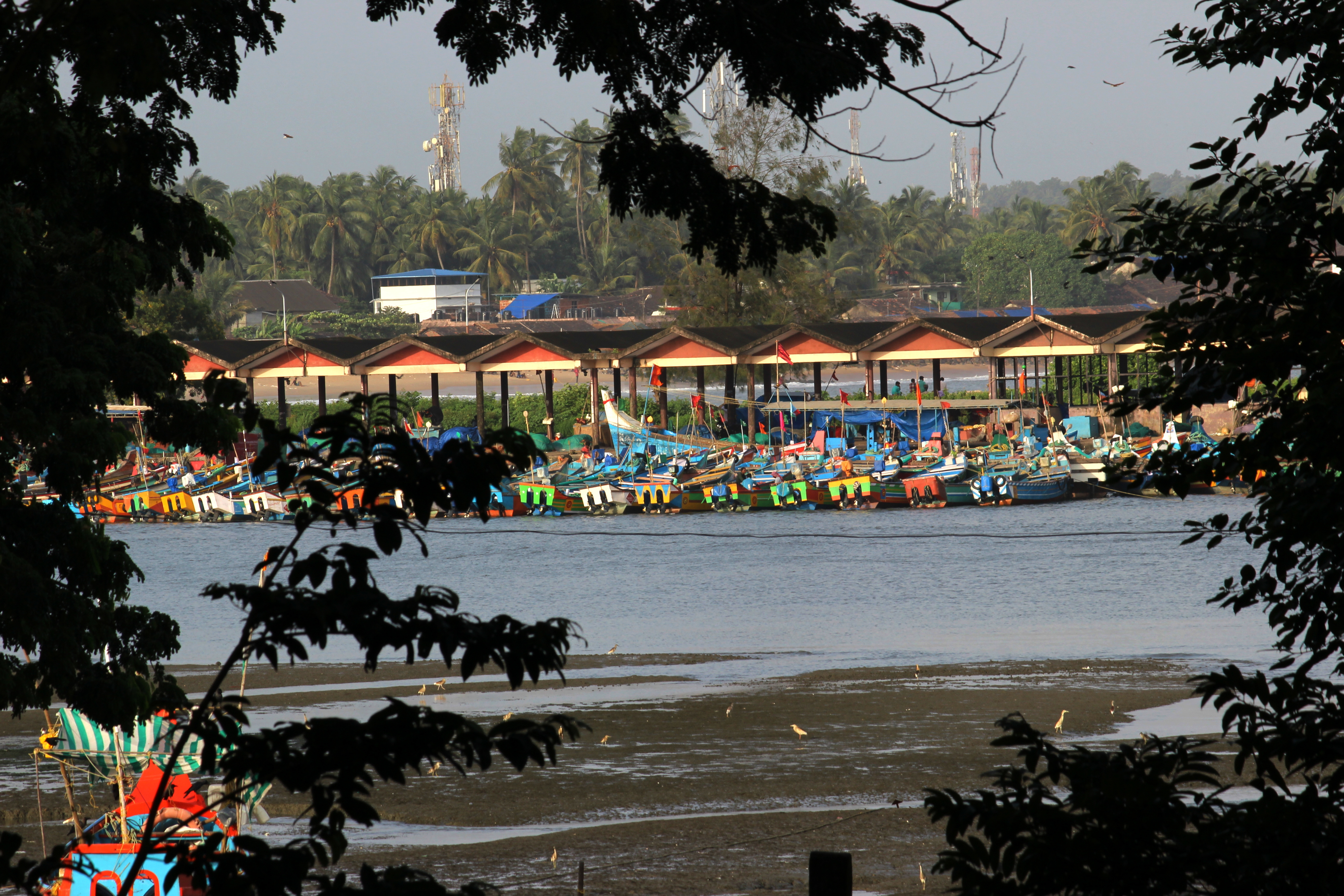
The Mappila Bay harbour at Ayikkara. On one side, there is St. Angelo Fort (built in 1505) and on the other side is Arakkal palace.

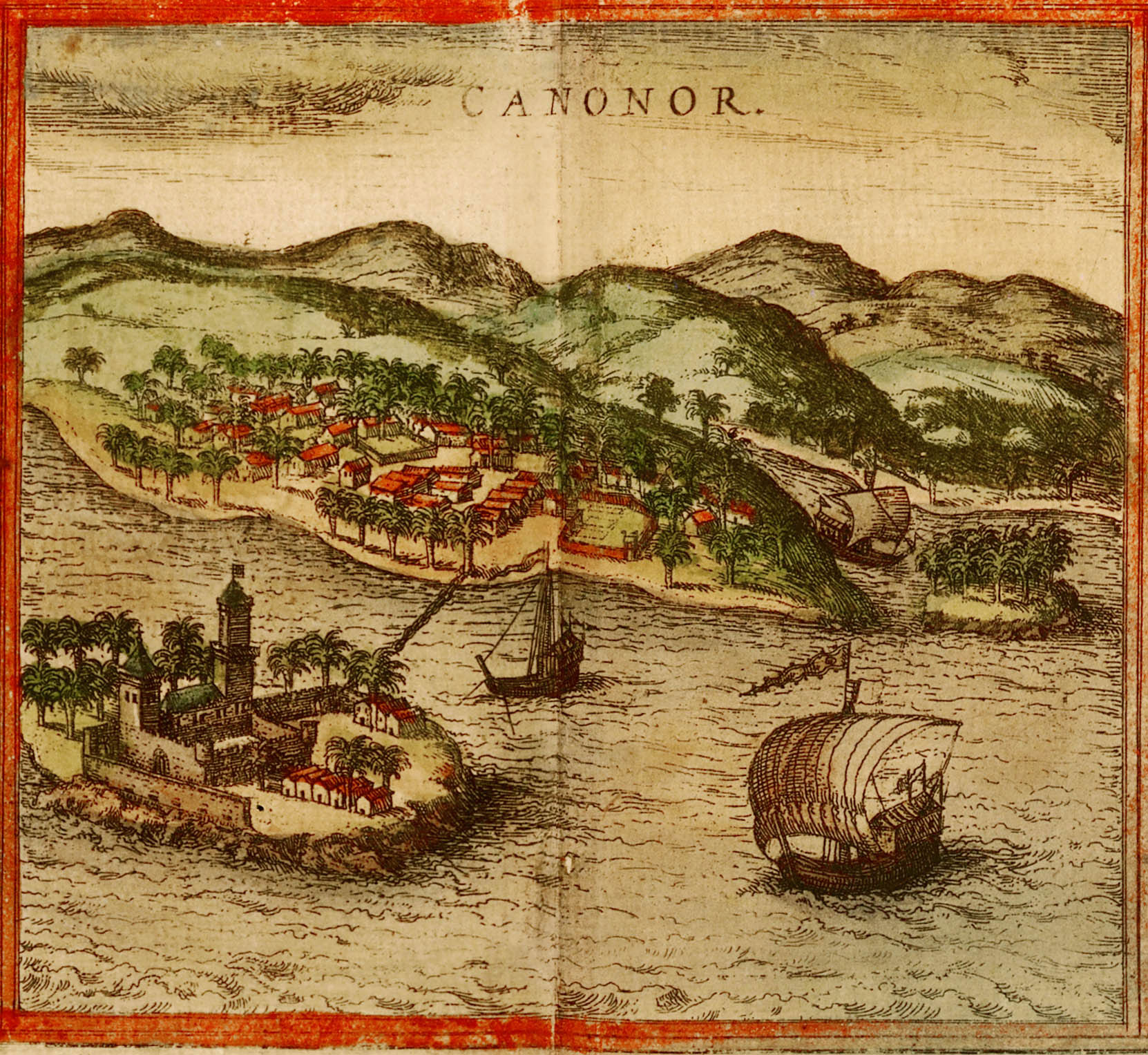
A portrait of Kannur drawn in 1572, from Georg Braun and Frans Hogenberg's atlas Civitates orbis terrarum, Volume I

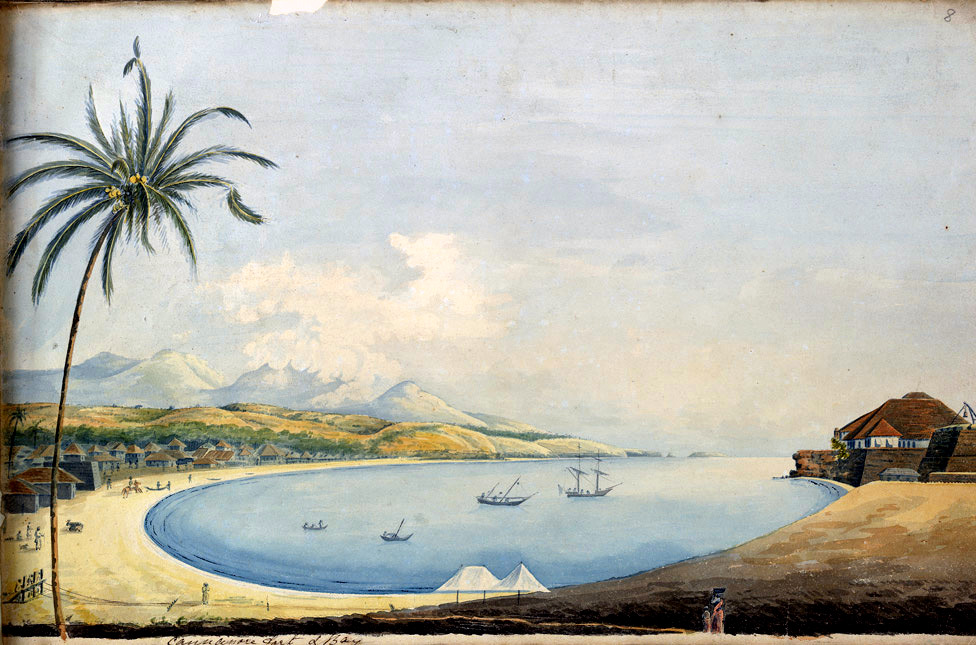
Kannur fort and Bay; a watercolor by John Johnston (1795–1801)

==== Ancient era ====
North Malabar was the seat of powerful kingdom based at Ezhimala in the Sangam period (1st–5th century CE). The ancient port of Naura, which is mentioned in the Periplus of the Erythraean Sea as a port somewhere north of Muziris is identified with Kannur. The kingdom of Ezhimala had jurisdiction over two Nadus - The coastal Poozhinadu and the hilly eastern Karkanadu. According to the works of Sangam literature, Poozhinadu consisted much of the coastal belt between Mangalore and Kozhikode. Karkanadu consisted of Wayanad-Gudalur hilly region with parts of Kodagu (Coorg). It is said that Nannan, the most renowned ruler of Ezhimala dynasty, took refuge at Wayanad hills in the 5th century CE when he was lost to Cheras, just before his execution in a battle, according to the Sangam works.

==== Early Middle Ages ====
Ezhimala kingdom was succeeded by Mushika dynasty in the early medieval period, most possibly due to the migration of Tuluva Brahmins from Tulu Nadu. The Indian anthropologist Ayinapalli Aiyappan states that a powerful and warlike clan of the Bunt community of Tulu Nadu was called Kola Bari and the Kolathiri Raja of Kolathunadu was a descendant of this clan. The Kolathunadu (Kannur) Kingdom at the peak of its power, reportedly extended from Netravati River (Mangalore) in the north to Korapuzha (Kozhikode) in the south with Arabian Sea on the west and Kodagu hills on the eastern boundary, also including the isolated islands of Lakshadweep in the Arabian Sea.

An Old Malayalam inscription (Ramanthali inscriptions), dated to 1075 CE, mentioning king Kunda Alupa, the ruler of Alupa dynasty of Mangalore, can be found at Ezhimala (the former headquarters of Mushika dynasty) near Cannanore, Kerala. The Arabic inscription on a copper slab within the Madayi Mosque in Kannur records its foundation year as 1124 CE. In his book on travels (Il Milione), Marco Polo recounts his visit to the area in the mid 1290s. Other visitors included Faxian, the Buddhist pilgrim and Ibn Batuta, writer and historian of Tangiers.

==== Late Middle Ages ====
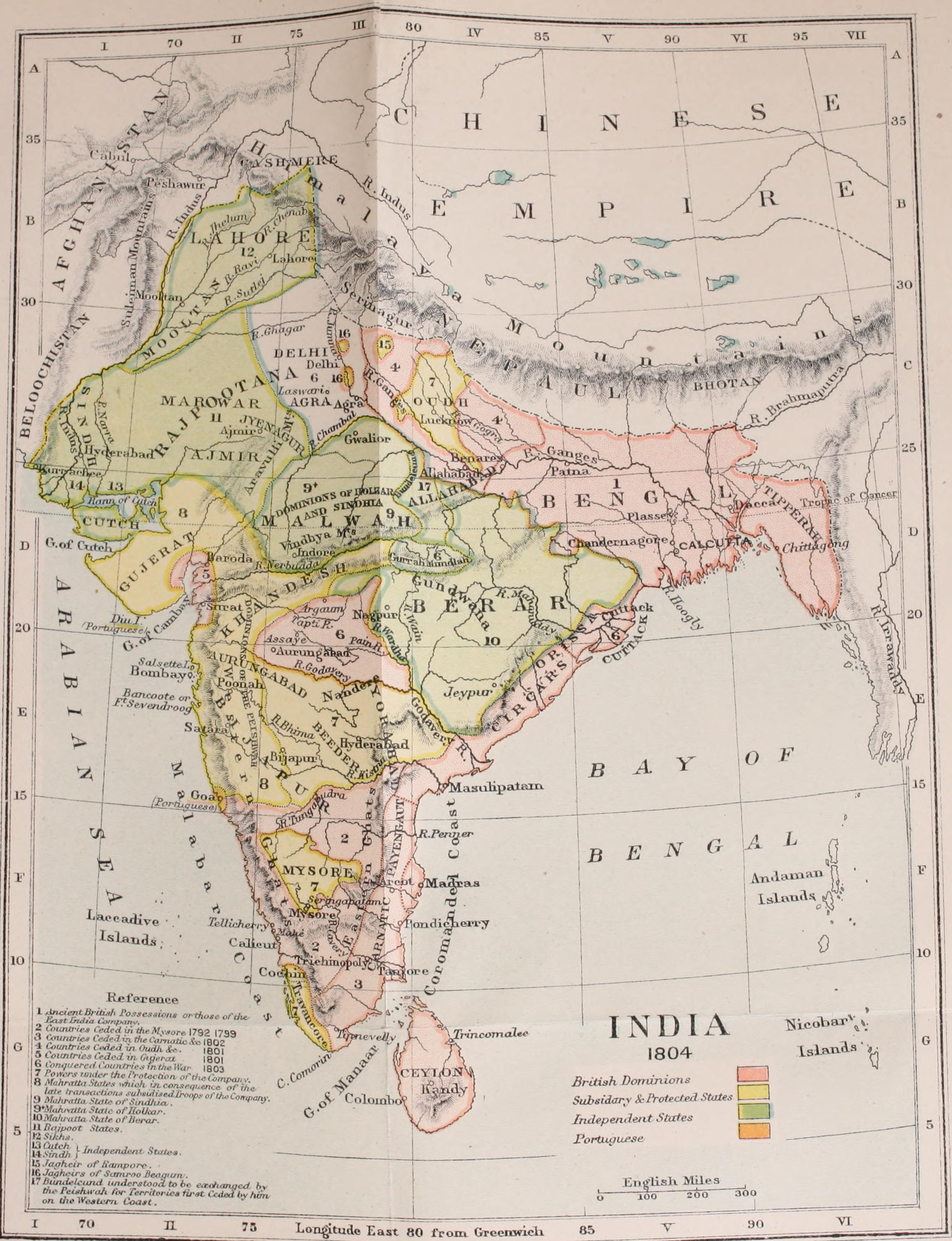
An old map of India in 1804. Note that only Thalassery, Kozhikode, and Kochi, are marked as cities within the present-day state of Kerala

Until the 16th century CE, the Kasargod town was known by the name Kanhirakode (may be by the meaning, 'The land of Kanhira Trees') in Malayalam. The Kumbla dynasty, who swayed over the land of southern Tulu Nadu wedged between Chandragiri River and Netravati River (including present-day Taluks of Manjeshwar and Kasaragod) from Maipady Palace at Kumbla, had also been vassals to the Kolathunadu, before the Carnatic conquests of Vijayanagara Empire. The Kumbla dynasty had a mixed lineage of Malayali Nairs and Tuluva Brahmins. They also claimed their origin from Cheraman Perumals of Kerala. Francis Buchanan-Hamilton states that the customs of Kumbla dynasty were similar to those of the contemporary Malayali kings, though Kumbla was considered as the southernmost region of Tulu Nadu. Just like other contemporary kings of Kerala in the medieval period, The powerful Kolathu Raja also came under the influence of Zamorin later. The Kolathunadu in the late medieval period emerged into independent 10 principalities i.e., Kadathanadu (Vadakara), Randathara or Poyanad (Dharmadom), Kottayam (Thalassery), Nileshwaram, Iruvazhinadu (Panoor, Kurumbranad etc., under separate royal chieftains due to the outcome of internal dissensions. The Nileshwaram dynasty on the northernmost part of Kolathiri dominion, were relatives to both Kolathunadu as well as the Zamorin of Calicut, in the early medieval period.

Kannur was an important trading centre in the 12th century, with active business connections with Persia and Arabia. It served as the British military headquarters on India's west coast until 1887. Kannur Cantonment is the only cantonment board in Kerala. Kannur was the capital city of Kolathunadu, one of the four powerful kingdoms who ruled Kerala during the medieval period. Arakkal Kingdom and Chirakkal kingdom were two vassal kingdoms based in the city of Kannur. The port at Kozhikode held the superior economic and political position in medieval Kerala coast, while Kannur, Kollam, and Kochi, were commercially important secondary ports, where the traders from various parts of the world would gather. St. Angelo Fort was built in 1505 by Dom Francisco de Almeida, the first Portuguese Viceroy of India. The Dutch captured the fort from the Portuguese in 1663. They modernized the fort and built the bastions Hollandia, Zeelandia, and Frieslandia that are the major features of the present structure. The original Portuguese fort was pulled down later. A painting of this fort and the fishing ferry behind it can be seen in the Rijksmuseum Amsterdam. The Dutch sold the fort to the king Ali Raja of Arakkal in 1772. The British conquered it in 1790 and used it as one of their major military stations on the Malabar Coast. During the 17th century, Kannur was the capital city of the only Muslim Sultanate in the Malabar region – Arakkal. The Ali Rajas of Arakkal kingdom, near Kannur, who were the vassals of the Kolathiri, ruled over the Lakshadweep islands.

In 1761, the British captured Mahé, and the settlement was handed over to the ruler of Kadathanadu. The British restored Mahé to the French as a part of the 1763 Treaty of Paris. In 1779, the Anglo-French war broke out, resulting in the French loss of Mahé. In 1783, the British agreed to restore to the French their settlements in India, and Mahé was handed over to the French in 1785.

In conjunction with her sister city, Thalassery, it was the third-largest city on the western coast of British India in the 18th century after Bombay and Karachi. Vatakara and Koyilandy were two major coastal towns in North Malabar region besides Kannur and Thalassery.

=== Portuguese influences ===
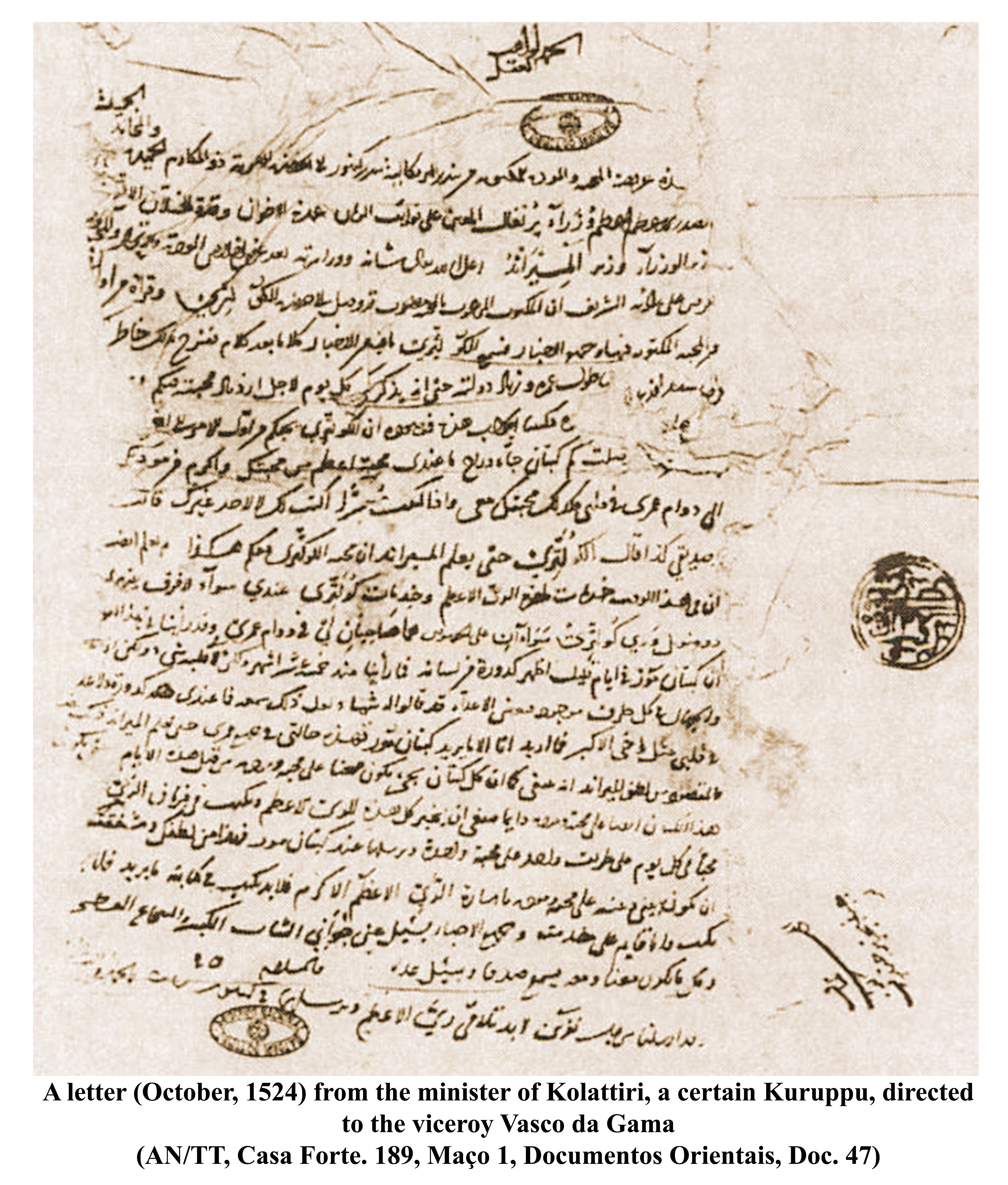
Kolattiri Raja's minister Kuruppu's Arabic letter to Vasco da Gama (1524)

The maritime spice trade monopoly in the Indian Ocean stayed with the Arabs during the High and Late Middle Ages. However, the dominance of Middle East traders was challenged in the European Age of Discovery. After Vasco Da Gama's arrival in Kappad Kozhikode in 1498, the Portuguese began to dominate eastern shipping, and the spice-trade in particular. The Zamorin of Kozhikode permitted the new visitors to trade with his subjects such that Portuguese trade in Kozhikode prospered with the establishment of a factory and a fort. However, Portuguese attacks on Arab properties in his jurisdiction provoked the Zamorin and led to conflicts between them.

The ruler of the Kingdom of Tanur, who was a vassal to the Zamorin of Calicut, sided with the Portuguese, against his overlord at Kozhikode. As a result, the Kingdom of Tanur (Vettathunadu) became one of the earliest Portuguese Colonies in India. The ruler of Tanur also sided with Cochin. Many of the members of the royal family of Cochin in 16th and 17th members were selected from Vettom. However, the Tanur forces under the king fought for the Zamorin of Calicut in the Battle of Cochin (1504). However, the allegiance of the Mappila merchants in Tanur region still stayed under the Zamorin of Calicut.

The Portuguese took advantage of the rivalry between the Zamorin and the King of Kochi allied with Kochi. When Francisco de Almeida was appointed as Viceroy of Portuguese India in 1505, his headquarters was established at Fort Kochi (Fort Emmanuel) rather than in Kozhikode. During his reign, the Portuguese managed to dominate relations with Kochi and established a few fortresses on the Malabar Coast. Fort St Angelo or St. Angelo Fort was built at Kannur in 1505 and Fort St Thomas was built at Kollam(Quilon) in 1518 by the Portuguese. However, the Portuguese suffered setbacks from attacks by Zamorin forces in Malabar region; especially from naval attacks under the leadership of Kozhikode admirals known as Kunjali Marakkars, which compelled them to seek a treaty. The Kunjali Marakkars are credited with organizing the first naval defense of the Indian coast. An insurrection at the Port of Quilon between the Arabs and the Portuguese led to the end of the Portuguese era in Quilon. In 1571, the Portuguese were defeated by the Zamorin forces in the battle at Chaliyam Fort. The Portuguese were ousted by the Dutch East India Company, who during the conflicts between the Kozhikode and the Kochi, gained control of the trade.

=== Under Mysore Sultans ===
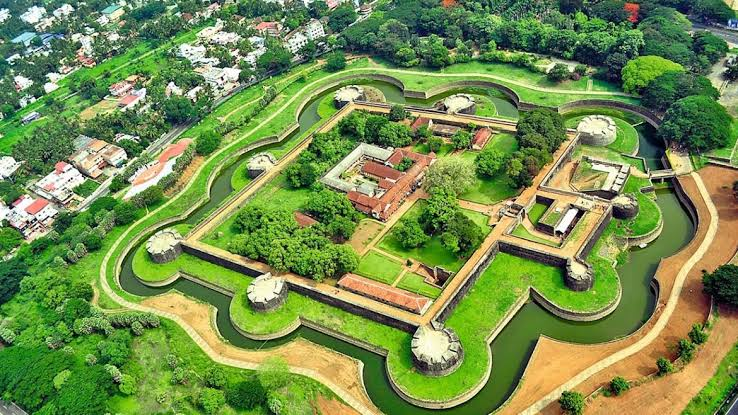
Palakkad Fort

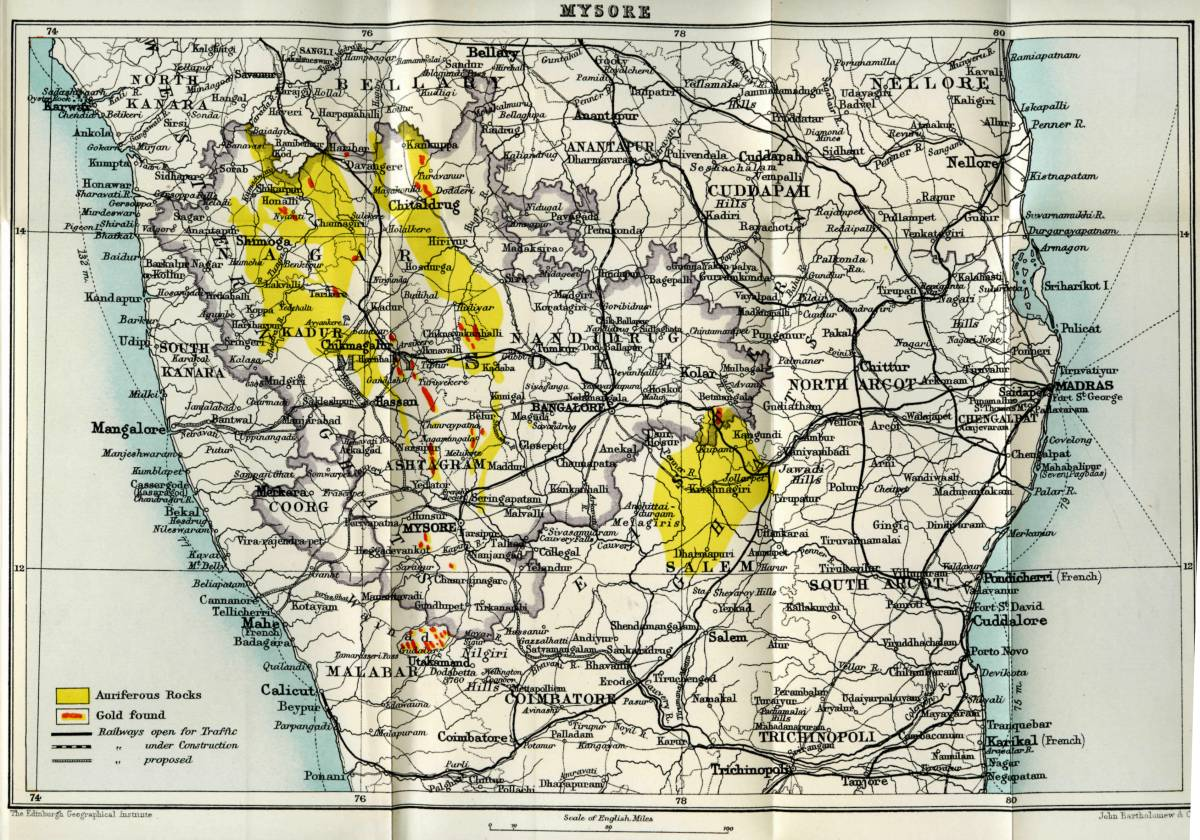
Malabar as a part of the erstwhile Kingdom of Mysore

In 1757, to check the invasion of the Zamorin of Calicut, the Palakkad Raja sought the help of Hyder Ali of Mysore. In 1766, Haider Ali of Mysore defeated the Samoothiri of Kozhikode – an East India Company ally at the time – and absorbed Kozhikode to his state. After the Third Mysore War (1790–1792), Malabar was placed under the control of the company. Eventually, the status of the Samoothiri was reduced to that of a pensioner of the company (1806). When Wayanad was under Hyder Ali's rule, the ghat road from Vythiri to Thamarassery was constructed. Then the British rulers developed this route to Carter road. His son and successor, Tipu Sultan, launched campaigns against the expanding British East India Company, resulting in two of the four Anglo-Mysore Wars.

=== Colonial period ===
Tipu ultimately ceded the Malabar district and South Kanara to the company in the 1790s; both were initially annexed to the Bombay Presidency of British India. After the Anglo-Mysore wars, the parts of Malabar Coast, those became British colonies, were organized into a district of British India. Later the region was transferred into the Madras Presidency in 1800. The administrative headquarters were at Calicut (Kozhikode). Local affairs were managed by the District Board at Calicut along with Taluk Boards located at Malappuram, Thalassery, Palakkad and Mananthavady. Initially the British had to suffer local resistance against their rule under the leadership of Kerala Varma Pazhassi Raja, who had popular support in Thalassery-Wayanad region. During the 19th century, British established their army stations at Kannur, Malappuram, and Calicut. Malappuram which was one of the European military stations in Madras presidency since 1852, also became the special police force headquarters of Malabar District, with the establishment of the Malabar Special Police in 1885. The oldest railway lines of Kerala lie in Malabar District which was laid in the late 19th century for the transportation of good and services; the line laid from Tirur to Beypore in 1861 being the first among them.

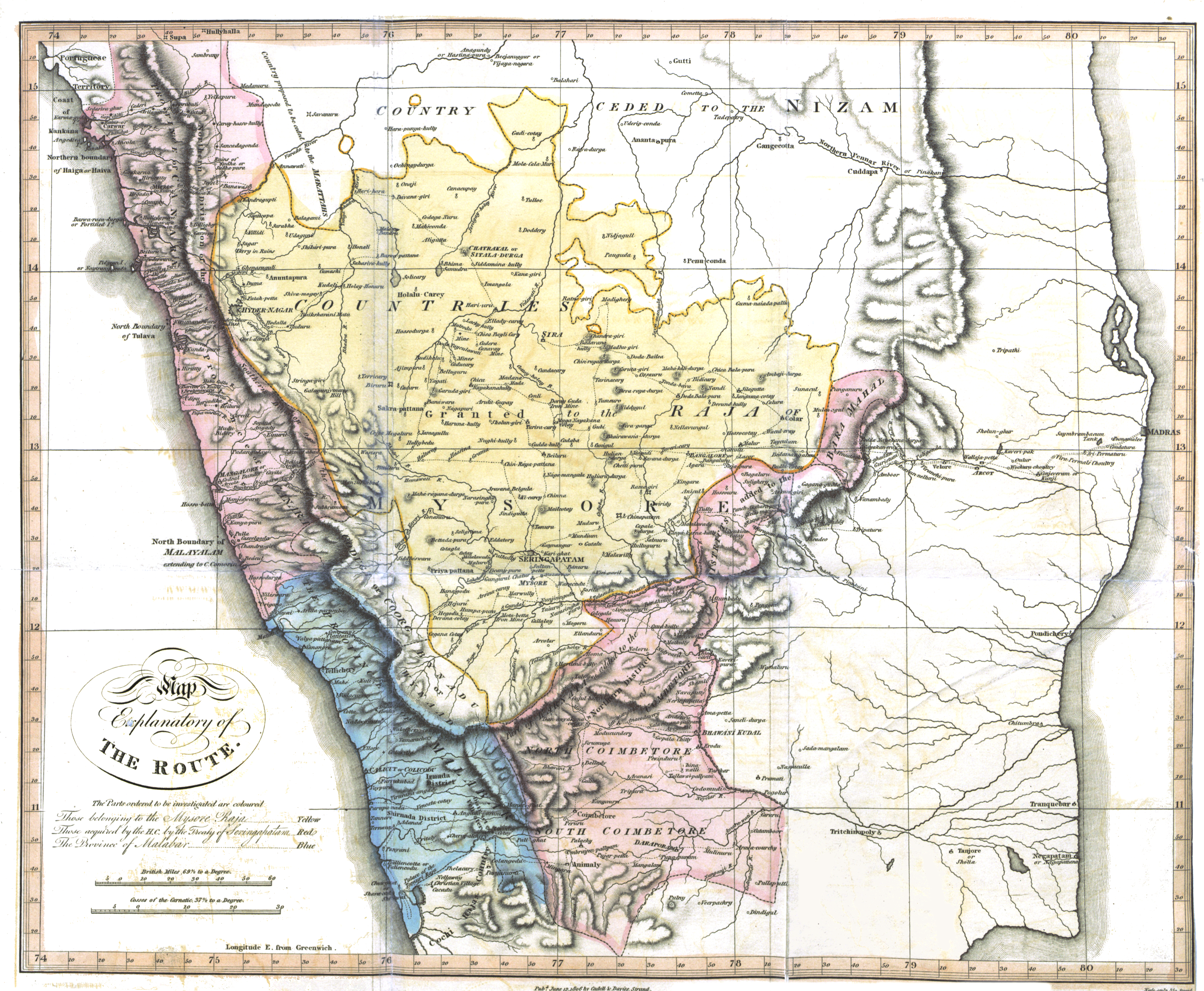
A map of Malabar District (Malayalam district) drawn by Francis Buchanan-Hamilton in 1807. Kasaragod region of South Canara was also included in Malayalam region (just above the blue shaded region)

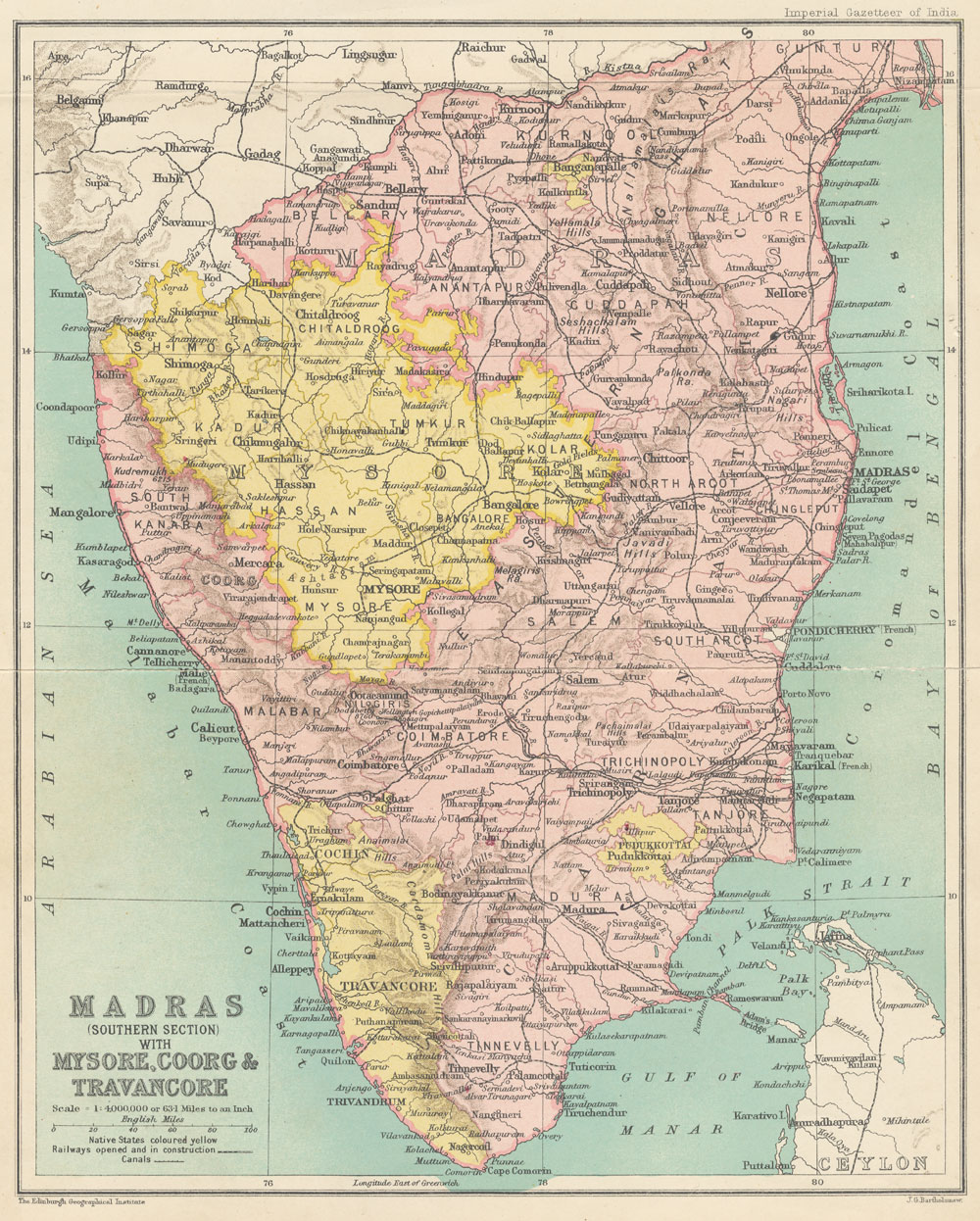
A map of the Madras Presidency in 1909

According to William Logan, the Taluks of Malabar could be subdivided on the basis of the feudal lords who ruled them before as given below:

==== Chirakkal Taluk ====
The Amsoms included in Chirakkal Taluk was classified into two divisions of Kolathunadu and Randathara (also called Poyanadu). There were 44 Amsoms in the Taluk.

===== Kolathunadu =====
Kolathunadu was the land where Kolattiri Rajas (Chirakkal family) were historically considered as the main authority. It was ruled by Kolattiri Raja,Arakkal Kingdom, and Kingdom of Mysore in various periods. It consisted of the following 36 Amsoms:

- Payyannur
- Vellur
- Karivellur
- Korom
- Eramam
- Kuttur (Payyanur)
- Kuttiyeri
- Chuzhali
- Kanhileri
- Kalliad
- Malapattam
- Koyyam
- Kurumathur
- Taliparamba
- Pattuvam
- Ezhome
- Cheruthazham
- Kunhimangalam
- Madayi
- Matool
- Cherukunnu
- Kannapuram
- Irinave
- Pappinisseri
- Kalliasseri
- Morazha
- Kayaralam
- Kuttiattoor
- Maniyoor
- Munderi
- Cheleri
- Kannadiparamba
- Chirakkal
- Azhikode
- Puzhathi
- Elayavoor

===== Randathara =====
Randathara was also called Poyanadu due to the belief that it was the place from where the Cheraman Perumal took his final departure on the journey to Mecca. It was originally a part of Kolathunadu, but was treated as a different Nadu. It consisted of the following 7 Amsoms:

- Edakkad
- Chembilode
- Iriveri
- Makreri
- Anjarakkandy
- Mavilayi
- Muzhappilangad

==== Kottayam Taluk ====
The Amsoms included in Kottayam Taluk was classified into four divisions- The English Settlement at Tellicherry and Dharmapattanam Islands, Iruvazhinadu, Kurangott Nayar Nadu, and Kottayam. There were 28 Amsoms in the Taluk.

===== The English Settlement at Tellicherry and Dharmapattanam Islands =====
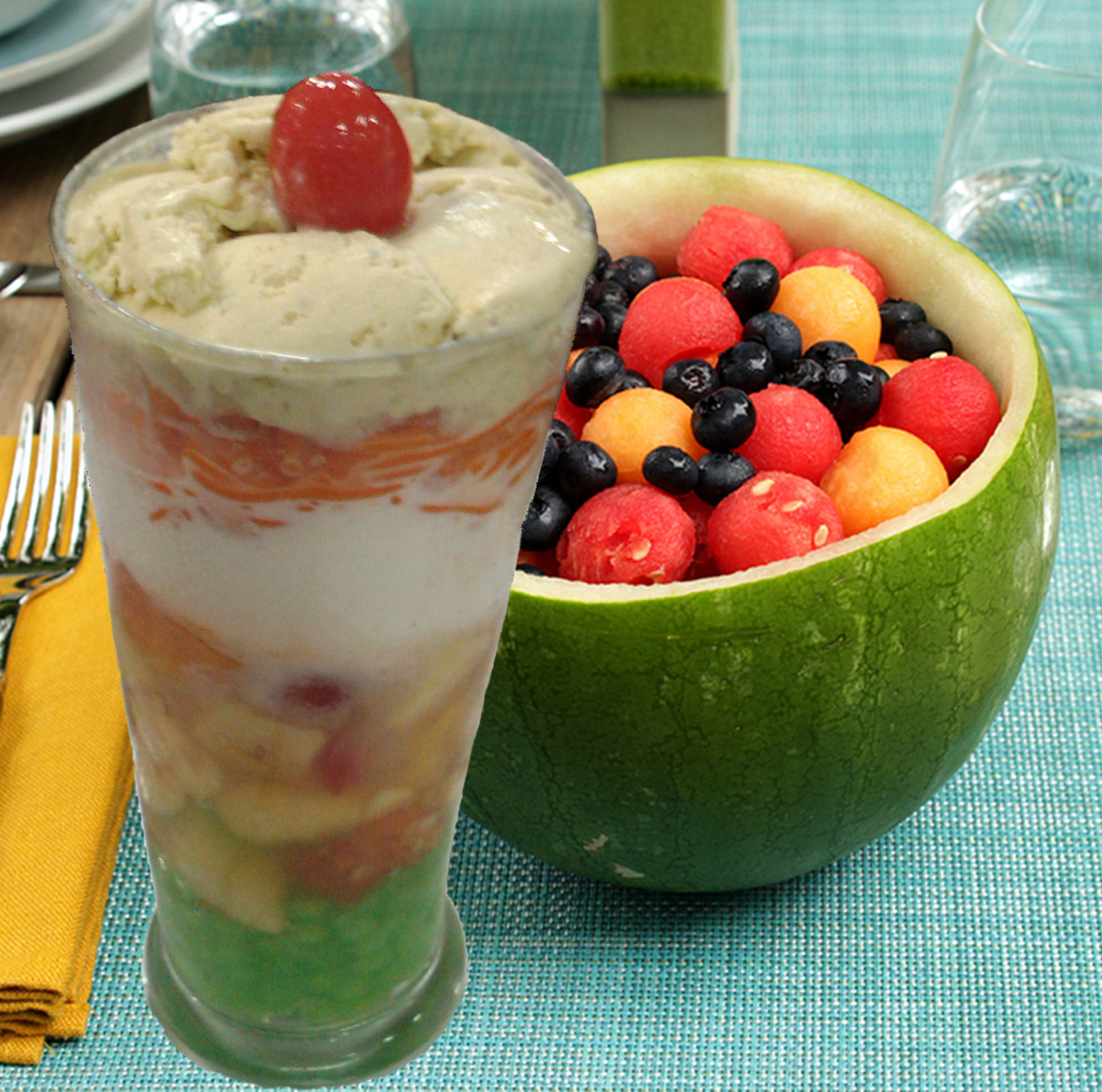
Thalassery is also notable for Thalassery cuisine

It was a part of the ancient Kolathunadu. Later it became a part of the Arakkal kingdom and Kingdom of Mysore. The island of Dharmapattanam was claimed by all of the Kolattu Rajas, Kottayam Rajas, and Arakkal Bibi. The English had settled here and started a factory here. It consisted of the following 4 Amsoms:

- Dharmadam
- Thalassery
- Mailanjanmam
- Thiruvangad

===== Iruvazhinadu =====
It was also under the Kolathunadu earlier. When the English factory was established at Thalassery, Iruvazhinadu was held by six families of Nambiars – Kunnummal, Chandroth, Kizhakkedath, Kampurath, Narangozhi, and Kariyad Nambiars. Kurangott Nayar's possession also probably formed part of the original territory of Iruvazhinadu. It consisted of the following 6 Amsoms:

- Panoor
- Puthur
- Thrippangottur
- Panniyannur
- Peringalam
- Kariyad

===== Kurangott Nayar Nadu =====
It laid between the English settlement at Thalassery and the French settlement at Mahe. It consisted of the following two Amsoms.

- Olavilam
- Kallayi

===== Kottayam =====
It was also earlier a part of Kolathunadu. The Kottayam Rajas (also known as Puranattu Rajas in the meaning of foreign Kshatriya caste) received their territory from the Kolattu Rajas. Pazhassi Raja was a Kottayam Raja. It consisted of the following 16 Amsoms.

- Koodali
- Pattannur
- Chavassery
- Veliyambra
- Muzhakkunnu
- Gannavam
- Manathana
- Kannavam
- Sivapuram
- Pazhassi
- Kandamkunnu
- Paduvilayi
- Pinarayi
- Nettur
- Kadirur
- Kottayam

==== Wynad Taluk ====
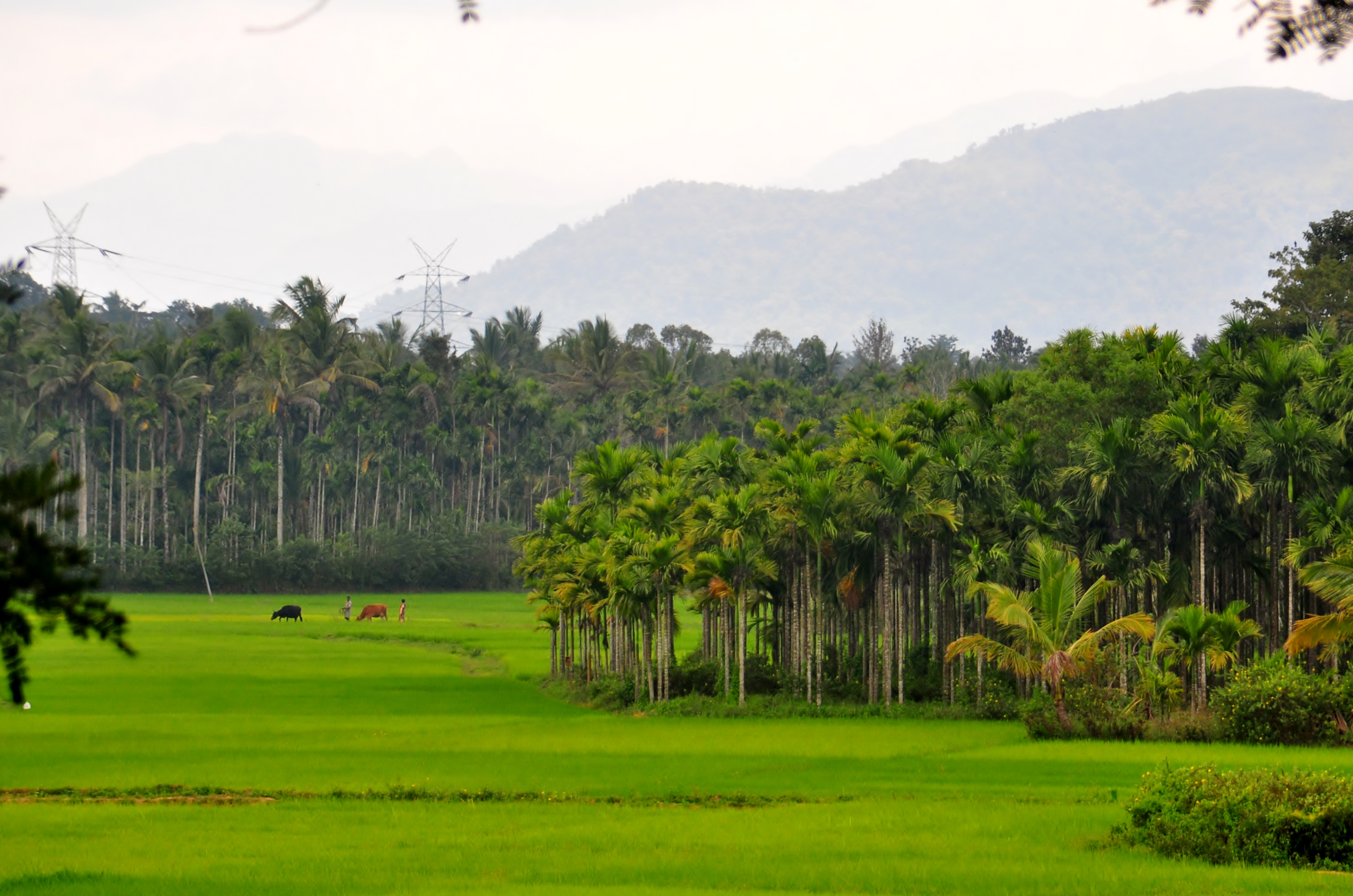
Wayanad, a part of the greater Deccan Plateau, is the only plateau region of Kerala

The Amsoms included in Wynad Taluk was classified into three divisions- North Wynad, South Wynad, and Southeast Wynad. There were 16 Amsoms in the Taluk. Wynad was a separate Revenue Division within Malabar District until 1924.

Wynad was ruled by various kingdoms including Kutumbiyas, Kadambas, Western Chalukyas, Hoysalas, Vijayanagaras, and the Kingdom of Mysore, in various periods. Wynad was home to many tribes. Wynad has relations with the Kingdom of Kottayam and Kurumbranad. Some parts were ruled by the Kottayam dynasty.

===== North Wynad =====
It consisted of the following 7 Amsoms:

- Periya
- Edavaka
- Thondernad
- Porunnanore
- Nalloornad
- Ellurnad
- Kuppathod

===== South Wynad =====
It consisted of the following 6 Amsoms:

- Poothadi
- Kurumbala
- Vythiri
- Edanatassakur
- Muppanad
- Sultan Bathery

===== Southeast Wynad =====
It was the regions included in the Gudalur and Pandalur Taluks of present Nilgiris district. Southeast Wynad was a part of Malabar District until 31 March 1877, when it was transferred to the neighbouring Nilgiris district due to the heavy population of Malabar and the small area of Nilgiris. It consisted of the following 3 Amsoms.

- Munnanad
- Nambalakode
- Cherankode

==== Kurumbranad Taluk ====
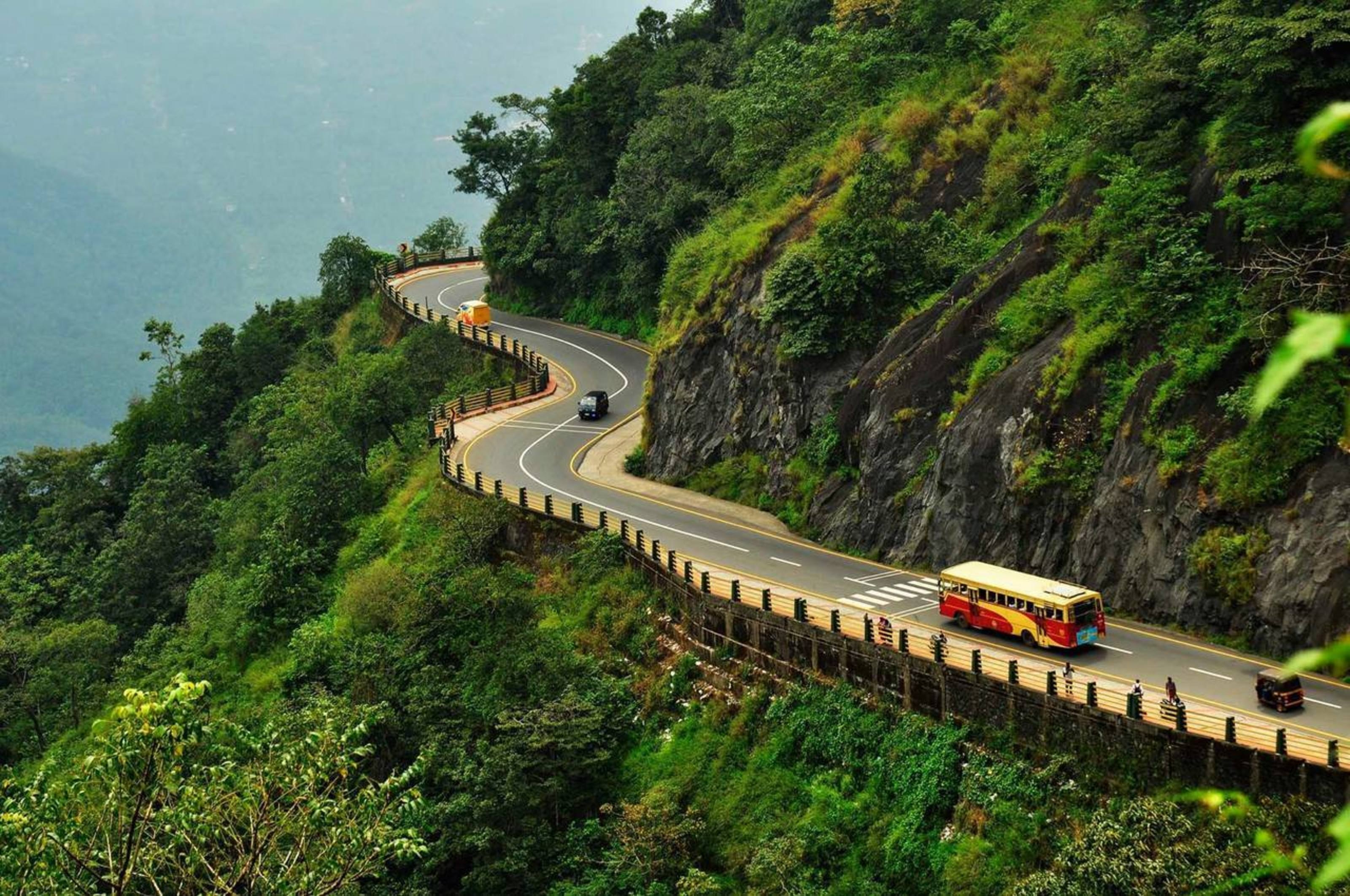
Thamarassery Churam in southeastern Kurumbranad was laid in the 18th century by Tipu Sultan, the ruler of Mysore.

The Amsoms included in Kurumbranad Taluk was classified into five divisions- Kadathanad, Payyormala, Payanad, Kurumbranad, and Thamarassery (Some Amsoms of Kurumbranad and Thamarassery were included in the Kozhikode Taluk). There were 57 Amsoms in the Taluk.

===== Kadathanad =====
It was also part of the Kolathunadu earlier. It formed a major portion of the Thekkalankur (Southern Regent), or the second headquarters of the Kolattiri Rajas. When the English company settled at Thalassery, Kadathanad was under the ancestors of the Kadathanad Rajas, who was then called Bavnores of Badagara. It consisted of the following 31 Amsoms:

- Azhiyur
- Muttungal
- Chorode
- Eramala
- Karthikappalli
- Purameri
- Edacheri
- Iringannur
- Thuneri
- Vellur
- Parakkadavu
- Chekkiad
- Valayam
- Velliyode
- Kunnummal
- Kavilumpara
- Kuttiadi
- Velom
- Cherapuram
- Kottappally
- Ayancheri
- Katameri
- Kuttipuram
- Kummangod
- Ponmeri
- Arakkilad
- Vatakara
- Memunda
- Palayad
- Puduppanam
- Maniyur
- Thiruvallur

===== Payyormala =====
It was under the control of the Nairs of Payyormala (Paleri, Avinyat, and Kutali Nairs). They were independent chieftains with some theoretical dependence on both the Kurumbranad and the Zamorin of Calicut. It consisted of the following 7 Amsoms:

- Palery
- Cheruvannur
- Meppayur
- Perambra
- Karayad
- Iringath

===== Payanadu =====
It was dependent on the Zamorin of Calicut. It consisted of the following 9 Amsoms:

- Keezhariyur
- Moodadi
- Pallikkara
- Meladi
- Viyyur
- Arikkulam
- Melur
- Chemancheri
- Thiruvangoor

===== Kurumbranad =====
It was subjected to the Kurumbranad family, which was connected with the Kingdom of Kottayam. It consisted of the following 9 Amsoms in Kurumbranad and Kozhikode Taluks:

- Kottur
- Trikkuttisseri
- Naduvannur
- Kavumthara
- Iyyad
- Panangad
- Nediyanad
- Kizhakkoth
- Madavoor

===== Thamarassery =====
It was also subjected to the Kottayam Rajas. It consisted of the following 9 Amsoms in Kurumbranad and Kozhikode Taluks:

- Ulliyeri
- Kokkallur
- Edakkara
- Kunnathara
- Annassery
- Naduvallur
- Nanmanda
- Nediyanad
- Koodathayi

==== Kozhikode Taluk ====
The Amsoms included in Kozhikode Taluk was classified into three divisions- Polanad, Beypore (Northern Parappanad), and Puzhavayi. There were 41 Amsoms in the Taluk. (As stated earlier, a part of Kurumbranad and Thamarasseri historical divisions of Kurumbranad Taluk was also included in the Kozhikode Taluk.)

===== Polanad =====
Polanad was ruled by the Porlathiri Rajas before the conquest of Kozhikode by the Zamorin of Calicut. After the conquest, the Zamorins shifted their headquarters from Nediyiruppu in Eranad to Kozhikode. It became the capital of the Zamorins. It consisted of the following 22 Amsoms:

- Elathur
- Thalakkulathur
- Makkada
- Chathamangalam
- Kunnamangalam
- Thamarassery
- Kuruvattur
- Padinyattumuri
- Karannur
- Edakkad
- Kacheri
- Nagaram
- Kasaba
- Valayanad
- Kottooli
- Chevayur
- Mayanad
- Kovoor
- Perumanna
- Peruvayal
- Iringallur
- Olavanna

===== Beypore (Northern Parappanad) =====
Parappanad kingdom was a dependent of the Zamorin of Calicut headquartered at Parappanangadi. It was divided into Northern Parappanad and Southern Parappanad. Northern Parappanad was headquartered at Beypore. It consisted of the following 3 Amsoms:

- Beypore
- Panniyankara
- Cheruvannur

===== Puzhavayi =====
It was ruled by its own Nairs who had a dependence on both of the Zamorin of Calicut and the Kurumbranad. It consisted of the following 9 Amsoms:

- Kedavur
- Thiruvambady
- Puthur
- Neeleswaram
- Koduvally
- Kanniparamba
- Chuloor
- Manashery
- Pannikode

==== Ernad Taluk ====
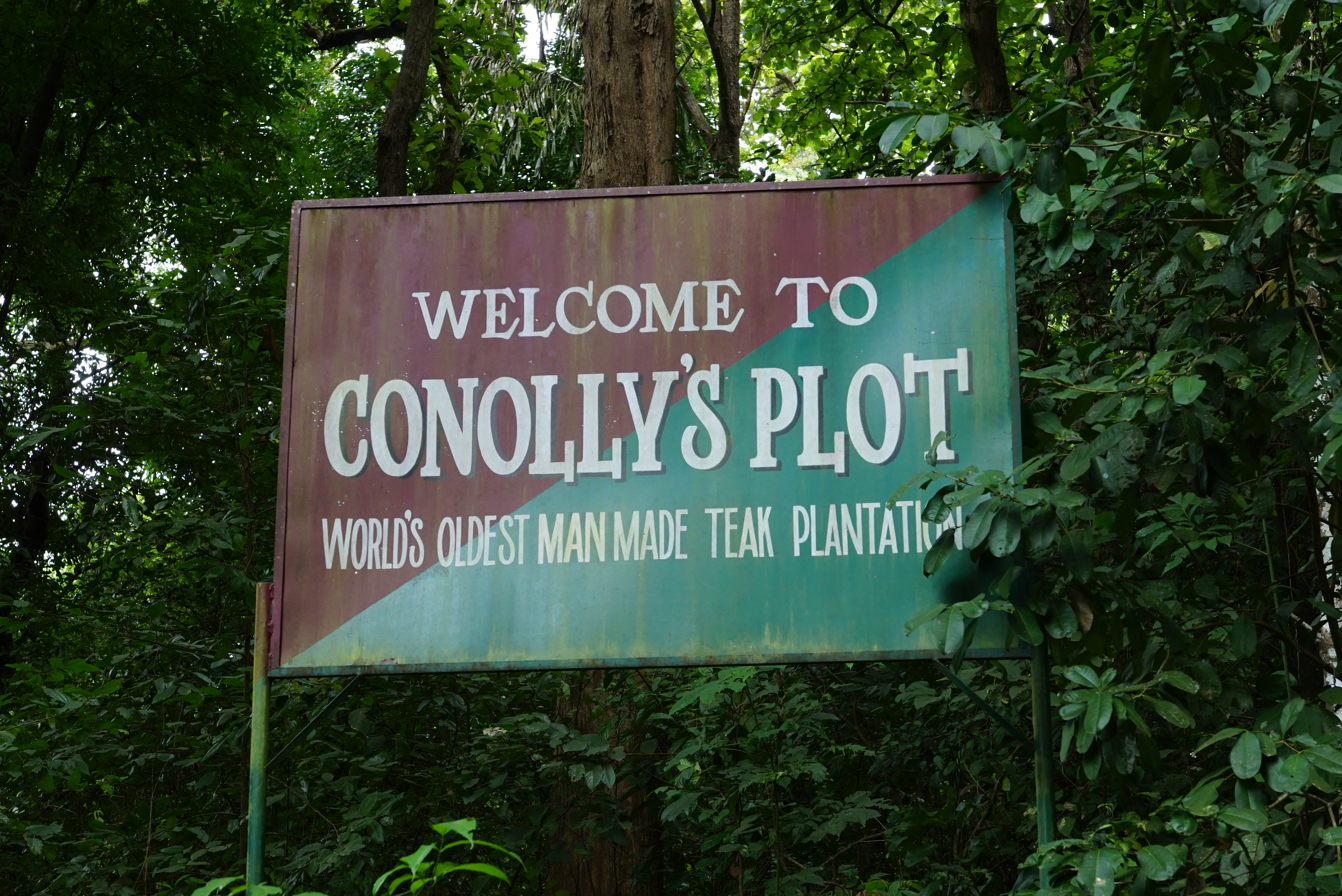
Conolly's plot, the world's oldest teak plantation at Nilambur in Eastern Eranad, was planted in the 1840s by the Collector H. V. Conolly.

The Amsoms included in Ernad Taluk was classified into four divisions- Parappur (Southern Parappanad), Ramanad, Cheranad, and Eranad. There were 52 Amsoms in the Taluk. (A part of Cheranad division was under Ponnani Taluk).

===== Parappur (Southern Parappanad) =====
Southern Parappanad was a dependent of the Zamorin of Calicut. Parappanangadi, the headquarters of Parappanad royal family, was at Southern Parappanad. It consisted of the following 7 Amsoms:

- Pazhanchannur
- Mannur
- Tenhipalam
- Neduva
- Vallikunnu
- Parappanangadi
- Nannambra

===== Ramanad =====
Ramanad was directly ruled by the Zamorin of Calicut. It consisted of the following 7 Amsoms:

- Nallur
- Azhinjilam
- Cherukavu
- Karad
- Karumarakkad
- Karippur
- Chelembra

===== Cheranad =====
Cheranad was also directly ruled by the Zamorin of Calicut. Cheranad was scattered in Eranad and Ponnani Taluks. The headquarters of Cheranad was Tirurangadi. It consisted of the following 17 Amsoms:

- Vadakkumpuram
- Valiyakunnu
- Kattipparuthi
- Athavanad
- Ummathoor
- Irimbiliyam
- Parudur
- Olakara
- Trikkulam
- Koduvayur
- Vengara
- Kannamangalam
- Oorakam-Melmuri
- Puthur
- Kottakkal
- Indiannur
- Valakkulam

===== Eranad =====
Eranad was the original headquarters of the Zamorin of Calicut. It was later changed to Kozhikode with the conquest of Polanad. It also was under the direct rule of the Zamorin. It consisted of the following 26 Amsoms:

- Mappram
- Cheekkode
- Urangattiri
- Mampad
- Nilambur
- Porur
- Wandoor
- Thiruvali
- Trikkalangode
- Karakunnu
- Iruvetti
- Kavanoor
- Chengara
- Puliyakode
- Kuzhimanna
- Kolathur
- Nediyiruppu
- Keezhmuri
- Melmuri
- Arimbra
- Valluvambram
- Irumbuzhi
- Manjeri
- Payyanad
- Elankur
- Ponmala

==== Walluvanad Taluk ====
Attappadi valley in Walluvanad

The Amsoms included in Walluvanad Taluk was classified into four divisions- Vellatiri (Walluvanad proper), Walluvanad, Nedunganad, and Kavalappara. There were 64 Amsoms in the Taluk.

===== Vellatiri (Walluvanad Proper) =====
Vellatiri (Walluvanad Proper) was the sole remaining territory of the Walluvanad Raja (Valluvakonathiri), who had once ruled majority of the South Malabar. A major part of Ernad Taluk was under Walluvanad before the expansion of the Ernad in 13th–14th centuries. Some of the Amsoms in this division was part of the Ernad Taluk. It consisted of the following 26 Amsoms:

- Kodur
- Kuruva
- Mankada-Pallipuram
- Mankada
- Valambur
- Karyavattam
- Nenmini
- Melattur
- Vettattur
- Kottoppadam
- Arakurissi
- Tachampara
- Arakkuparamba
- Chethallur
- Angadipuram
- Perinthalmanna
- Puzhakkattiri
- Pang
- Kolathur
- Kuruvambalam
- Pulamantol
- Elamkulam
- Anamangad
- Paral
- Chembrassery
- Pandikkad

===== Walluvanad =====
The Amsoms in this division was comparatively later acquisition by the Zamorin in the territory of the Walluvanad Raja. It consisted of the following 7 Amsoms:

- Tuvvur
- Thiruvizhamkunnu
- Thenkara
- Kumaramputhur
- Karimpuzha
- Thachchanattukara
- Aliparamba

===== Nedunganad =====
Nedunganad had been under the Zamorin for some time. After the disintegration of Perumals of Mahodayapuram, Nedunganad became independent. It was ruled by Nedungadis. Later it came under the Zamorin's kingdom. It consisted of the following 27 Amsoms:

- Elambulassery
- Vellinezhi
- Sreekrishnapuram
- Kadampazhipuram
- Kalladikode
- Vadakkumpuram
- Moothedath Madamba
- Thrikkadeeri
- Chalavara
- Cherpulassery
- Naduvattam-Karalmanna
- Kulukkallur
- Chundambatta
- Vilayur
- Pulasseri
- Naduvattam
- Muthuthala
- Perumudiyoor
- Nethirimangalam
- Pallippuram
- Kalladipatta
- Vallapuzha
- Kothakurssi
- Eledath Madamba
- Chunangad
- Mulanjur
- Perur

===== Kavalappara =====
Kavalappara had its own Nairs, who owed a sort of nominal allegiance both to the Zamorin of Calicut and the Kingdom of Cochin. It consisted of the following 6 Amsoms:

- Mundakkottukurissi
- Panamanna
- Koonathara
- Karakkad
- Kuzhappalli
- Mundamuka

==== Ponnani Taluk ====
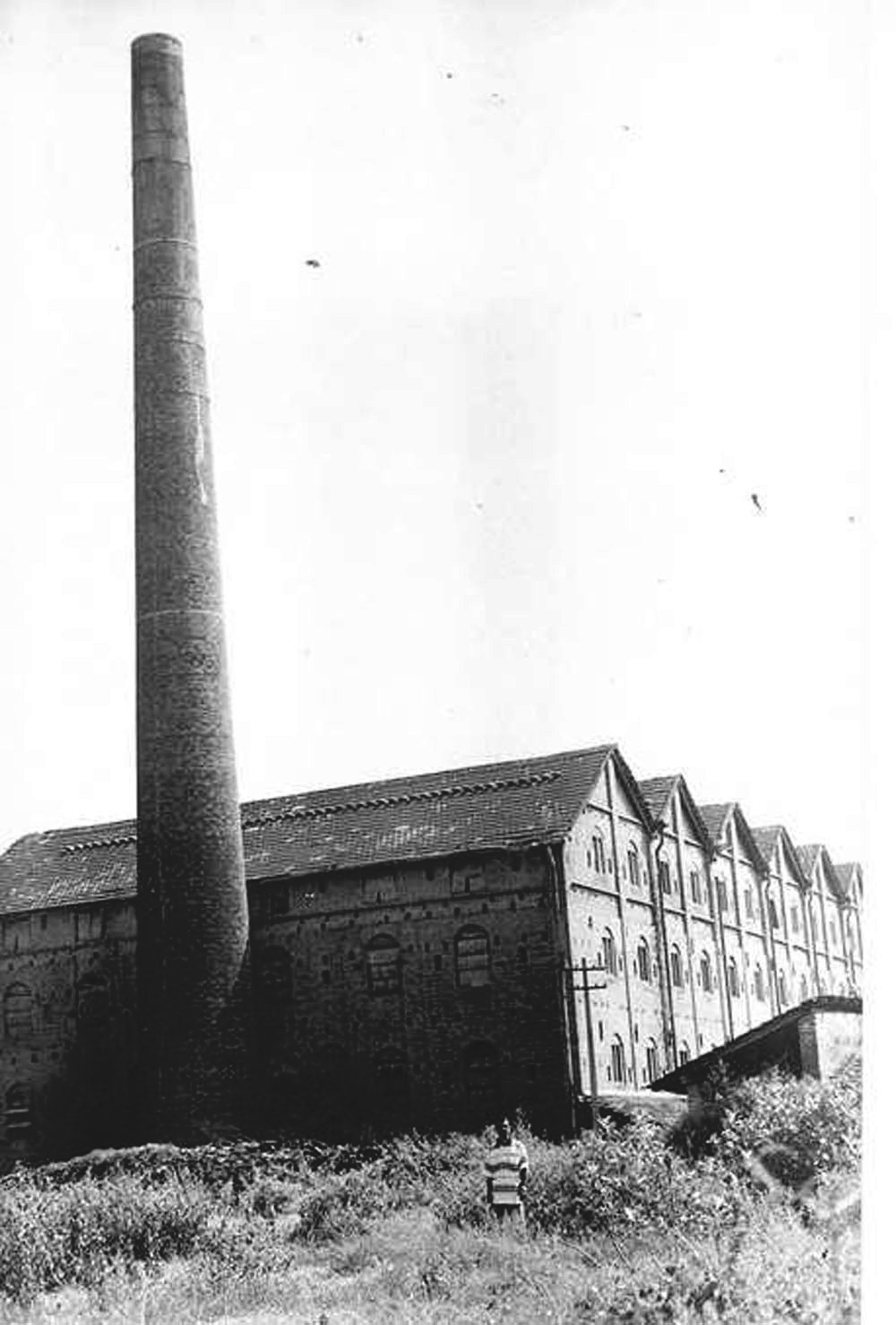
Kodakkal Tile Factory was run by the Commonwealth Trust at Kodakkal, Tirunavaya. The Tile Factory at Kodakkal, started in 1887, is the second tile manufacturing industry in India. First tile factory was at Feroke, which was a part of Eranad Taluk then

The Amsoms included in Ponnani Taluk was classified into three divisions- Vettathunad, Koottanad, Chavakkad, and the Island of Chetvai . There were 73 Amsoms in the Taluk.

===== Vettathunad =====
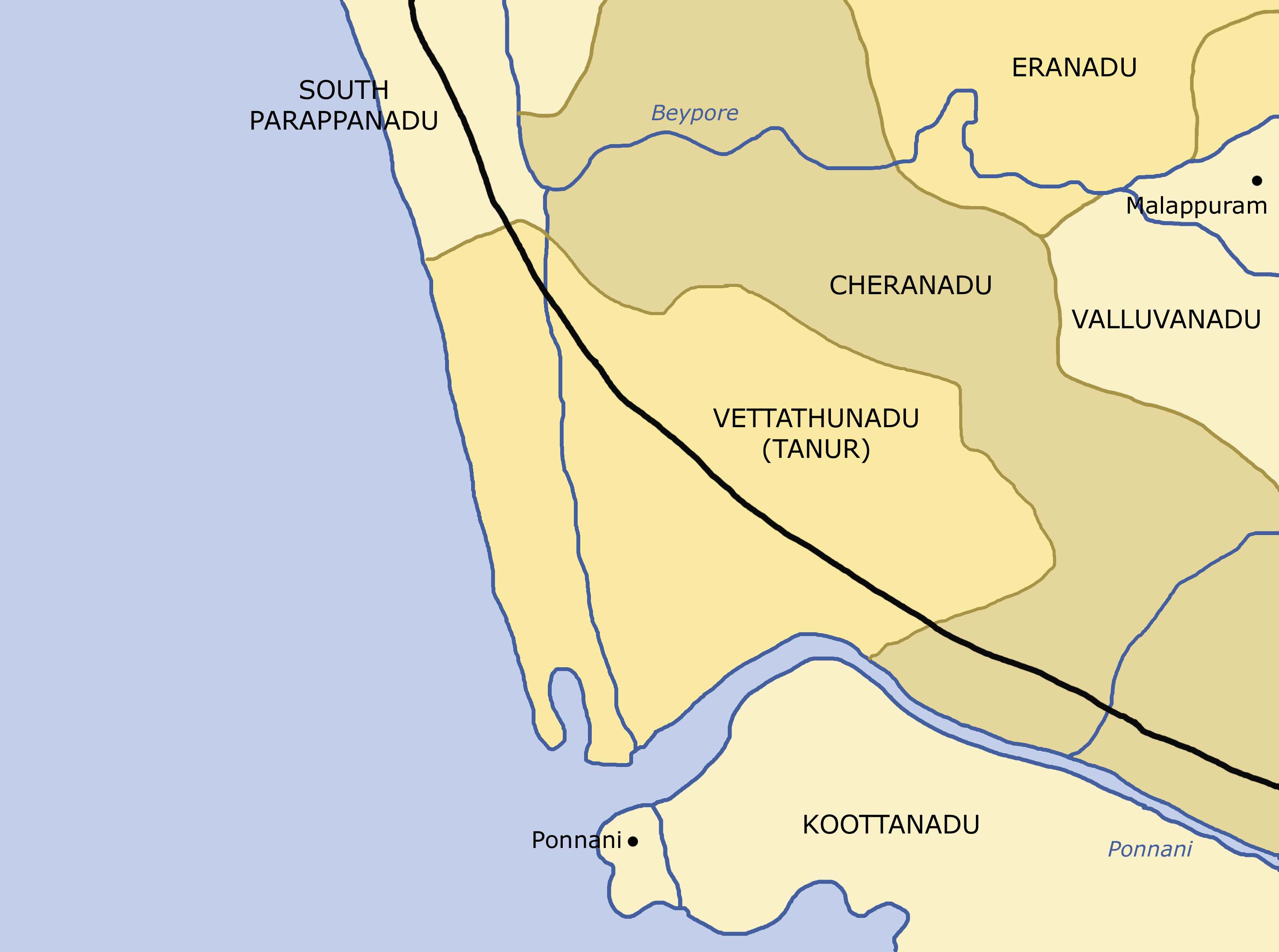
Kingdom of Tanur (Vettathunad)

Vettathunad, also known as the Kingdom of Tanur, was a coastal city-state kingdom in the Malabar Coast. It was ruled by the Vettathu Raja, who was dependent on the Zamorin of Calicut. The Kshatriya family of the Vettathu Rajas became extinct with the death of the last Raja on 24 May 1793. Vettathunad consisted of the following 21 Amsoms:

- Pariyapuram
- Rayirimangalam
- Ozhur
- Ponmundam
- Tanalur
- Niramaruthur
- Trikkandiyur
- Iringavoor
- Klari
- Kalpakanchery
- Melmuri
- Ananthavoor
- Kanmanam
- Thalakkad
- Vettom
- Pachattiri
- Mangalam
- Chennara
- Triprangode
- Pallipuram
- Purathur

===== Koottanad =====
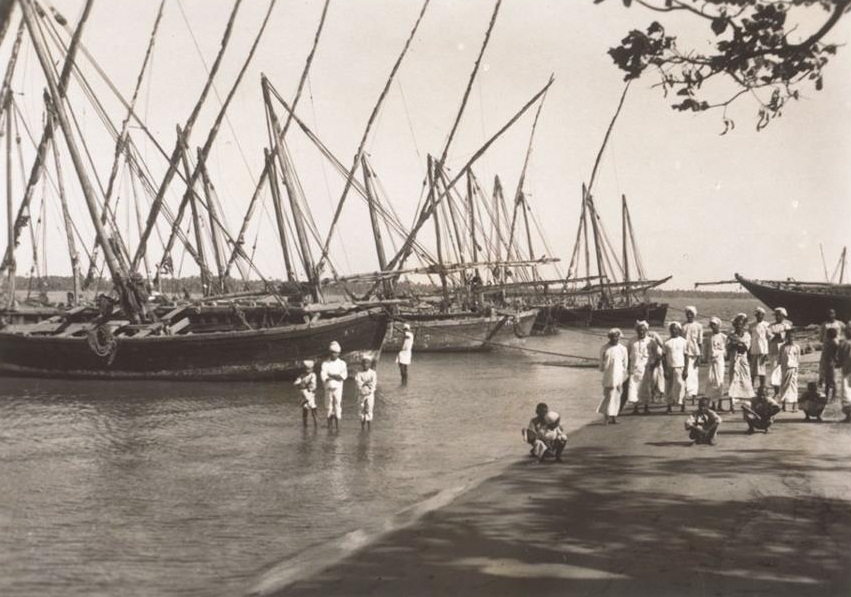
Ponnani harbour in the mid-1930s

The second home of the Zamorin of Calicut was Thrikkavil Kovilakam at Ponnani in Koottanad. The Zamorin had control over the Koottanad. It consisted of the following 24 Amsoms:

- Thavanur
- Kalady
- Kodanad
- Melattur
- Chekkod
- Anakkara
- Keezhmuri
- Pothanur
- Eswaramangalam
- Pallaprom
- Ponnani
- Kanjiramukku
- Edappal
- Vattamkulam
- Kumaranellur
- Kothachira
- Nagalassery
- Thirumittacode
- Othalur
- Kappur
- Alamkod
- Pallikkara
- Eramangalam
- Vayilathur

===== Chavakkad =====
Chavakkad had been under the suzerainty of the Zamorin. It consisted of the following 14 Amsoms:

- Veliyankode
- Ayiroor
- Kadikkad
- Punnayur
- Edakkazhiyur
- Palayoor
- Guruvayur
- Iringaprom
- Annakara
- Brahmakulam
- Mullassery
- Venkitangu
- Chavakkad
- Orumanayur

===== The Island of Chetvai =====
The Island of Chetvai had been earlier under the suzerainty of the Zamorin, but it came under the possession of the Dutch in 1717. It consisted of the following 7 Amsoms:

- Vadanappally
- Nattika
- Pallipuram
- Edathiruthy
- Kaipamangalam
- Pappinivattom
- Panangad

==== Palghat Taluk ====
The Amsoms included in Palghat Taluk was classified into three divisions- Palghat, Temmalapuram, and Naduvattam. There were 56 Amsoms in the Taluk.

===== Palghat =====
Palghat was ruled by the Palghat Rajas. Sometime previously to 1757, the Zamorin of Calicut, the Kingdom of Valluvanad, and the Kingdom of Cochin had tried to annex Palghat. Cochin had annexed Chittur region. Walluvanad Raja had a nominal sovereignty over the Nairs of Kongad, Edathara, and Mannur. Palghat division consisted of the following 23 Amsoms:

- Cheraya
- Kongad
- Mundur
- Kavilpad
- Akathethara
- Puthussery
- Elappully
- Polpully
- Pallatheri
- Puthur
- Koppam
- Yakkara
- Vadakkanthara
- Kodunthirapalli
- Edathara
- Kizhakkumpuram
- Thadukkassery
- Mathur
- Pallanchathanur
- Kannadi
- Kinassery
- Thiruvalathur
- Palathully

===== Temmalapuram =====
Temmalapuram consisted of the following 10 Amsoms:

- Chulanur
- Vadakkethara
- Kattusseri
- Kavasseri
- Tarur
- Kannanurpattola
- Ayakkad
- Mangalam
- Vadakkencherry
- Chittilamchery

===== Naduvattam =====
Naduvattam was originally under the Palghat Raja. Later the Zamorin of Calicut annexed Naduvattam into his kingdom. It consisted of the following 23 Amsoms:

- Kottayi
- Mankara
- Kuthanur
- Kuzhalmannam
- Vilayanchathanur
- Thenkurissi
- Thannissery
- Peruvemba
- Koduvayur
- Kakkayur
- Vilayannur
- Manjalur
- Erimayur
- Kunissery
- Pallavur
- Kudallur
- Pallassena
- Vadavannur
- Kizhakkethara
- Padinjarethara
- Vattekkad
- Panangattiri
- Muthalamada

==== Exceptional Nadus (1887) ====
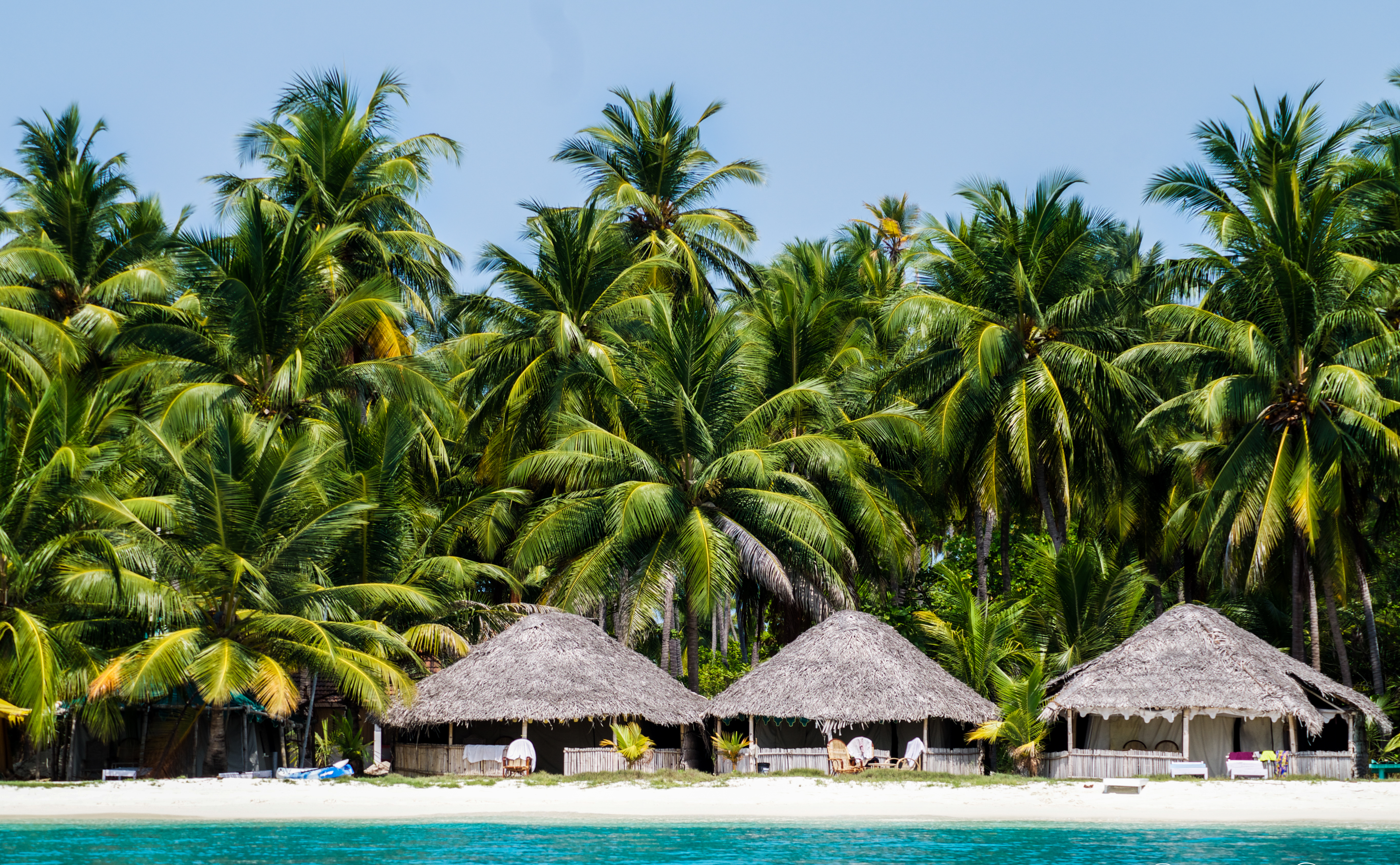
The uninhabited island of Bangaram in Lakshadweep

The Exceptional Nadus included the British colonies which were included in the Malabar District, those were detached from the mainland Taluks of Malabar District by land or sea.

===== Cannanore and Laccadive Islands =====
These islands were the territory of Arakkal kingdom outside the town of Kannur. They remained in Malabar district until the formation of the state of Kerala in 1956. It consisted of the following 5 inhabited islands of Lakshadweep:

- Agatti
- Kavaratti
- Andrott
- Kalpeni
- Minicoy

The uninhabited island of Bangaram was also a part.

===== Dutch settlements at Cochin (Fort Cochin Taluk) =====
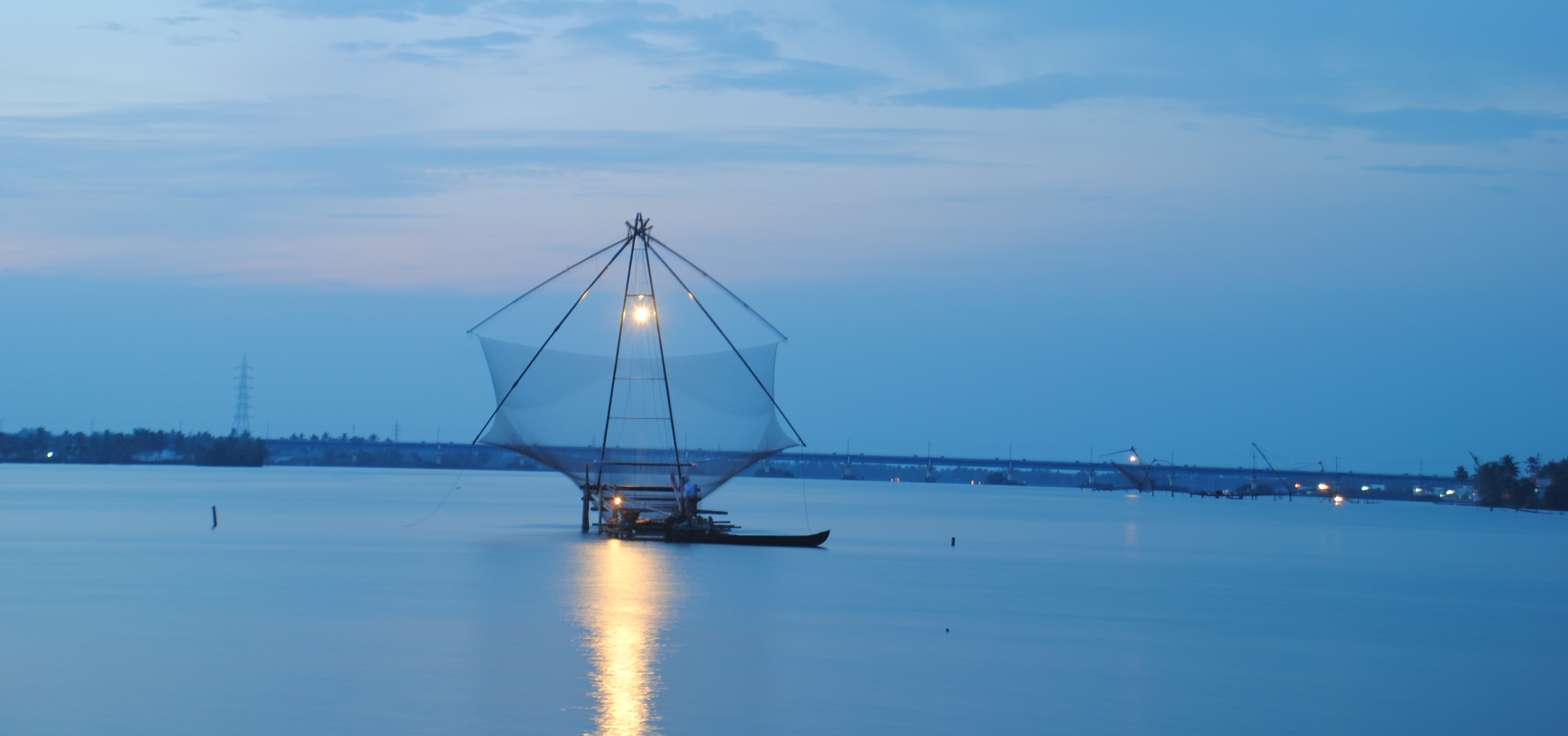
Chinese fishing nets in Fort Kochi

In 1814, the Dutch settlements at Fort Kochi region of present Kochi city was ceded to East India Company. They were attached to the Malabar District. They remained in the district until the formation of the state of Kerala in 1956. The settlement consisted of the town and fort of Kochi. It was the erstwhile municipality of Fort Kochi. In 1664, the municipality of Fort Kochi was established by Dutch Malabar, making it the first municipality in Indian subcontinent, which got dissolved when the Dutch authority got weaker in the 18th century. It consisted of the following gardens or Pattams:

- Tumboli Pattam
- Kattoor Pattam
- Athazhakkad Pattam
- Manakodathu Pattam
- Antony Fernandez Pattam
- Thekkepurupunkara Pattam
- Mundamveli Pattam
- Domingo Fernandez Palakkal Pattam
- Santiago Pattam
- Thaiveppu Pattam
- Belicho Rodriguez Pattam
- Saint Louis Pattam
- Duart Lemos Pattam
- Hendrick Silva Pattam
- Ramanthuruth Pattam
- Sondikalguvankure Pattam
- Palliport Hospital Parambu

===== The Dutch settlement at Thangacherry and the English Settlement at Anjengo =====
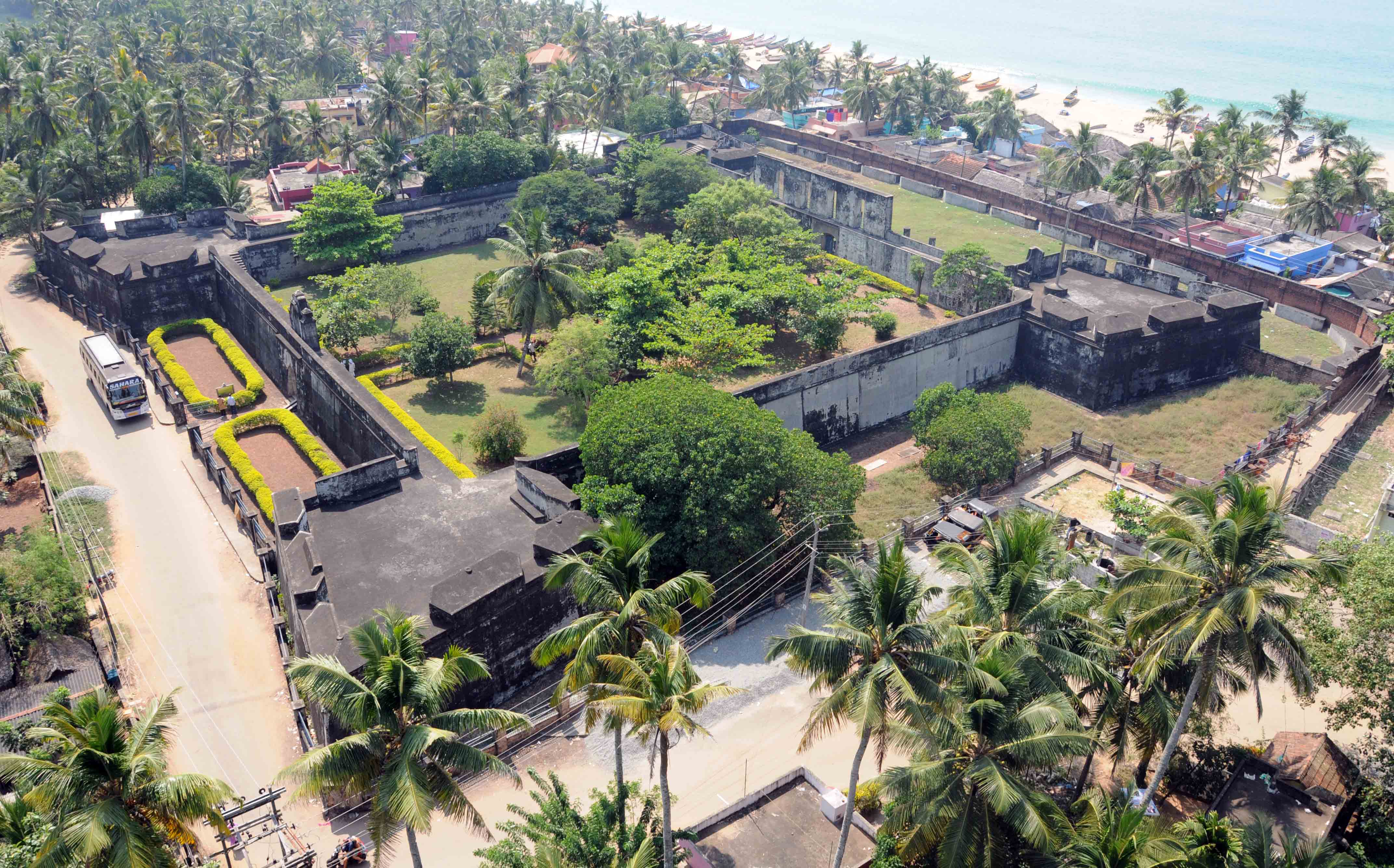
A view of Anchuthengu Fort. Anchuthengu was the southernmost point of Malabar District on the Malabar Coast while Minicoy was the southernmost island of Malabar District in the Arabian Sea

Those were the British colonies surrounded by the Kingdom of Travancore to three sides and Arabian Sea to one side. Thangassery is actually a part of the city of Kollam. Anchuthengu lies near Attingal in Thiruvananthapuram. Later Thangassery and Anchuthengu were transferred from Malabar to Tirunelveli district on 1 July 1927.

==== Political and social movements ====
The district was the venue for many of the Mappila revolts (uprisings against the British East India Company in Kerala) between 1792 and 1921. It is estimated that there were about 830 riots, large and small, during this period. Muttichira revolt, Mannur revolt, Cherur revolt, Manjeri revolt, Wandoor revolt, Kolathur revolt, Ponnani revolt, and Thrikkalur revolt are some important revolts during this period. During 1841–1921 there were more than 86 revolutions against the British officials alone. East India Company made an arrangement to collect revenue through Zamorin. However, a revolt under the leadership of Manjeri Athan Gurukkal took place opposing it in 1849.

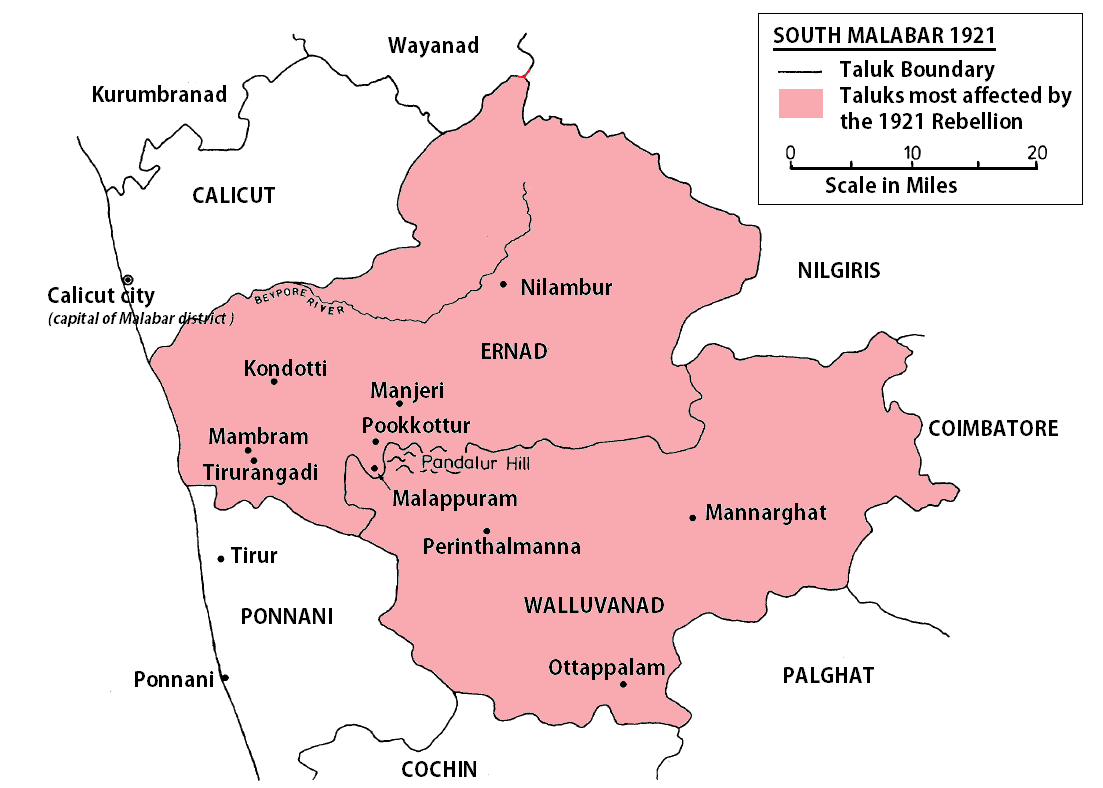
South Malabar during Malabar Rebellion

The Malabar district political conference of Indian National Congress held at Manjeri on 28 April 1920 strengthened Indian independence movement and national movement in Malabar District. That conference declared that the Montagu–Chelmsford Reforms were not able to satisfy the needs of British India. It also argued for land reform to seek solutions for the problems caused by the tenancy that existed in Malabar. However, the decision widened the drift between extremists and moderates within Congress. The conference resulted in the dissatisfaction of landlords with the Indian National Congress. It caused the leadership of the Malabar district Congress Committee to come under the control of the extremists who stood for labourers and the middle class. Eranad, Valluvanad, and Ponnani Taluks had been part of Khilafat Movement just after the Manjeri conference. The Khilafat non-cooperation demonstration conducted at Kalpakanchery in Ponnani Taluk (now a part of Tirur Taluk) on 22 March 1921 under the leadership of K. P. Kesava Menon was attended by about 20,000 people. The first all Kerala provincial conference of Indian National Congress held at Ottapalam in April 1921 also influenced the rebellion. Malabar Rebellion of 1921 was the last and important among the Mappila rebellions.

The cities/towns of Malappuram, Manjeri, Kondotty, Perinthalmanna, and Tirurangadi were the main strongholds of the rebels. The Battle of Pookkottur occurred as a part of the rebellion. After the army, police, and British authorities fled, the declaration of independence took place in over 200 villages in Eranad, Valluvanad, Ponnani, and Kozhikode taluks. The new country was given the name Malayala Rajyam (The land of Malayalam). On 25 August 1921, Variyan Kunnathu Kunjahammed Haji inaugurated the Military Training Center at Angadipuram, which was started by the revolutionary government. The feudal customs of Kumpil Kanji and Kanabhumi were abolished and the tenants were made landowners. A tax exemption was given for one year and a tax was imposed on the movement of goods from Wayanad to the Madras Presidency. Similar to the British, the structure of administration was built upon Collector, Governor, Viceroy, and King. The parallel government established courts, tax centers, food storage centers, the military, and the legal police. Passport system was introduced for those in the new country. Although the nation's lifespan is considered to have been less than six months, some British officials have suggested that the region was ruled by a parallel government for more than a year.

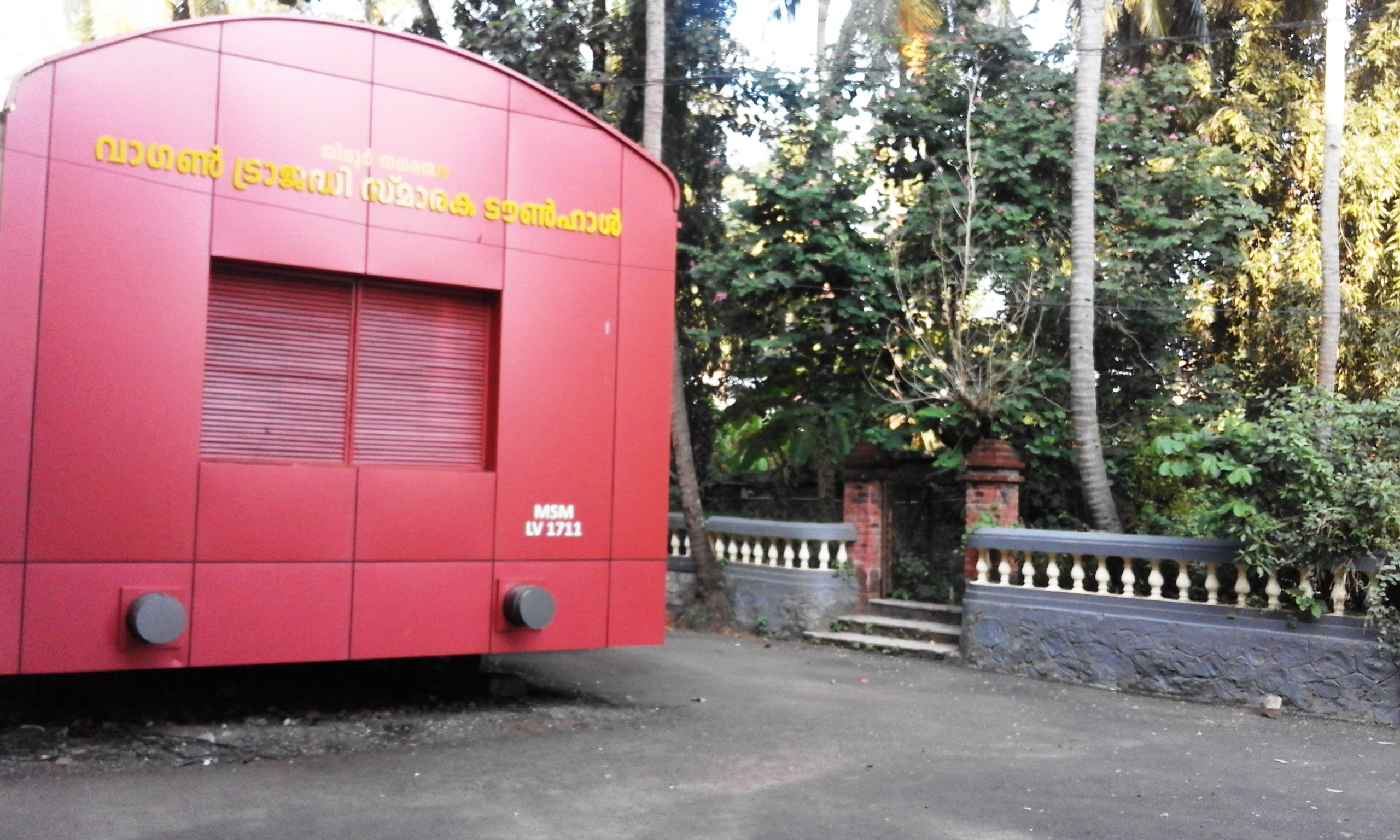
The Wagon tragedy memorial at Tirur

The rebels won to establish self-rule in the region for about six months. However, less than six months after the declaration of autonomy, the British managed to recapture it, and put it under the direct control of British Army Commander-in-Chief Chief Rawlson, General Barnett Stuart, Intelligence Chief Maurice Williams, and Police General Armitage. Many of the important British military regiments including Dorset, Karen, Yenier, Linston, Rajputana, Gorkha, Garwale, and Chin Kutchin reached Malabar for the reannexation of the South Malabar. The Wagon tragedy (1921) is still a saddening memory of the Malabar rebellion, where 64 prisoners died on 20 November 1921. The prisoners had been taken into custody following the Mappila Rebellion in various parts of the district. Their deaths through apparent negligence generated sympathy for Indian independence movement.

=== Post-Independence ===
After the Indian independence, Madras Presidency was reorganized into Madras state, which was divided along linguistic lines on 1 November 1956, when Malabar District was merged with erstwhile Kasaragod Taluk immediately to the north and the state of Travancore-Cochin to the south to form the state of Kerala. Malabar District was divided into the three districts of Kozhikode, Palakkad, and Kannur on 1 January 1957. The Chavakkad region of the Ponnani Taluk was transferred to the Thrissur district. Malappuram District was created from parts of Kozhikode and Palakkad in 1969, and Wayanad District was created in 1980 from parts of Kozhikode and Kannur.

== Geography ==
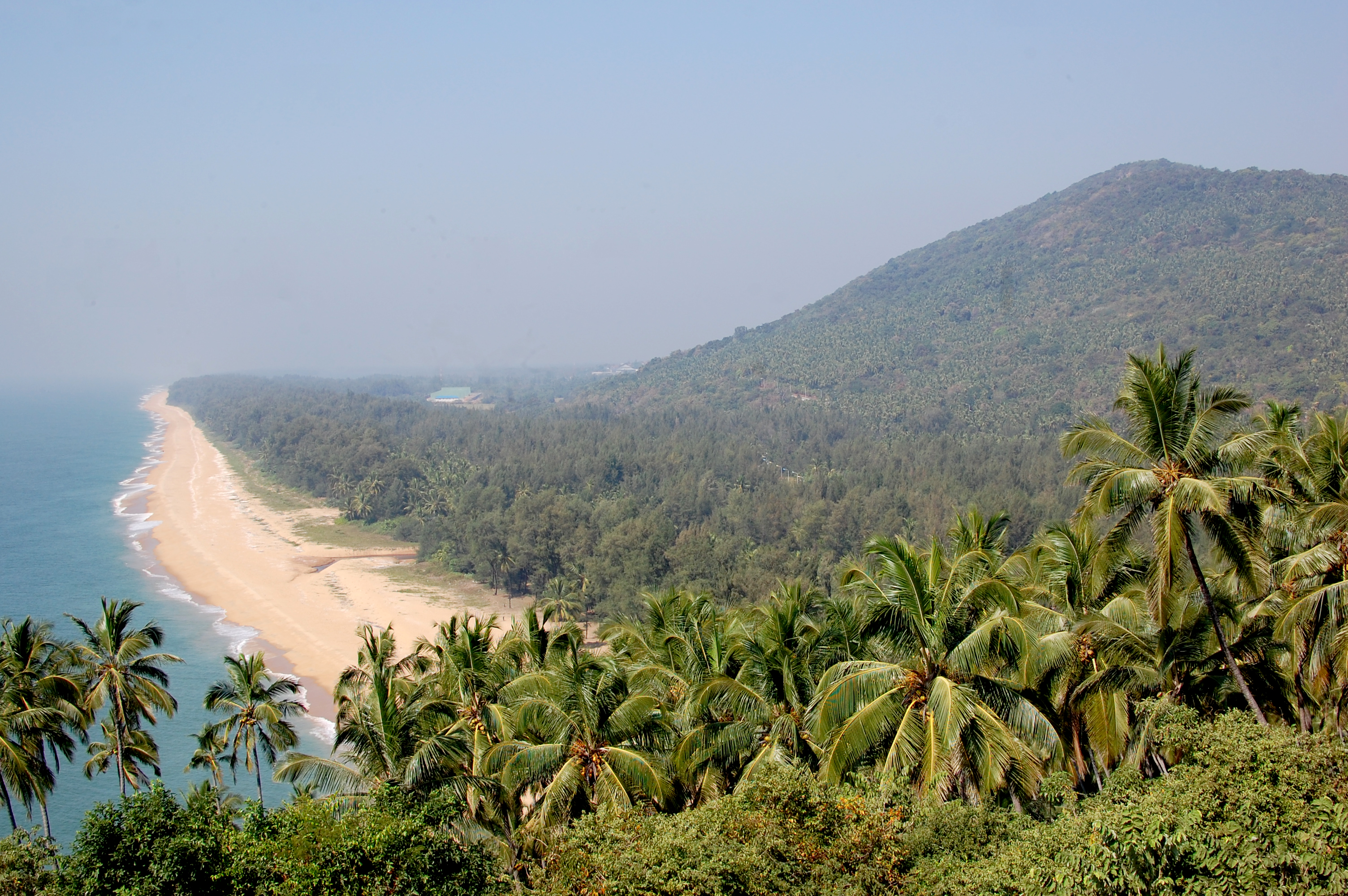
The hilly beach of Ezhimala had once been the headquarters of what is now known as North Malabar in ancient period.

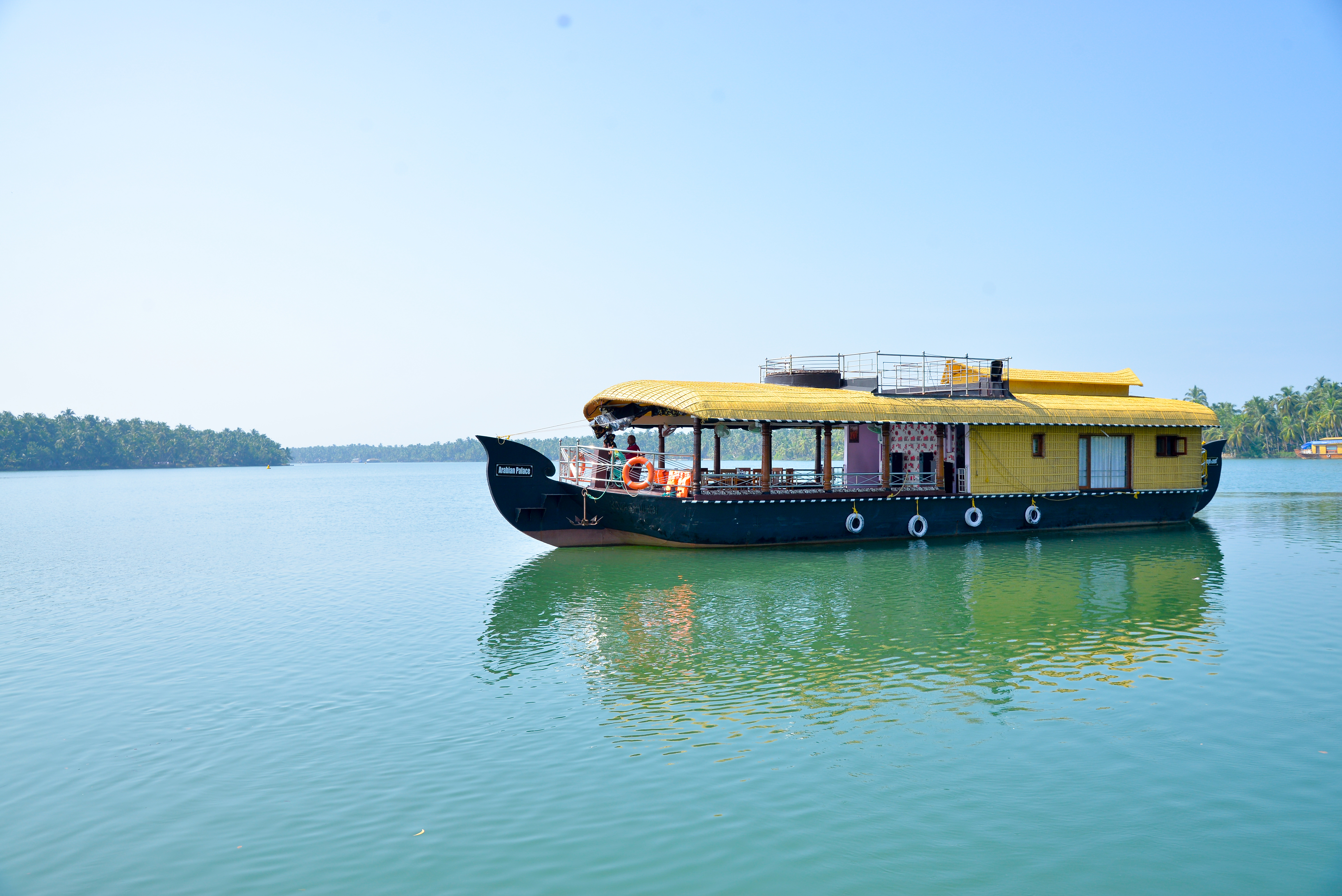
The Kavvayi Backwaters separated the British district of Malabar from South Canara (Mangalore)

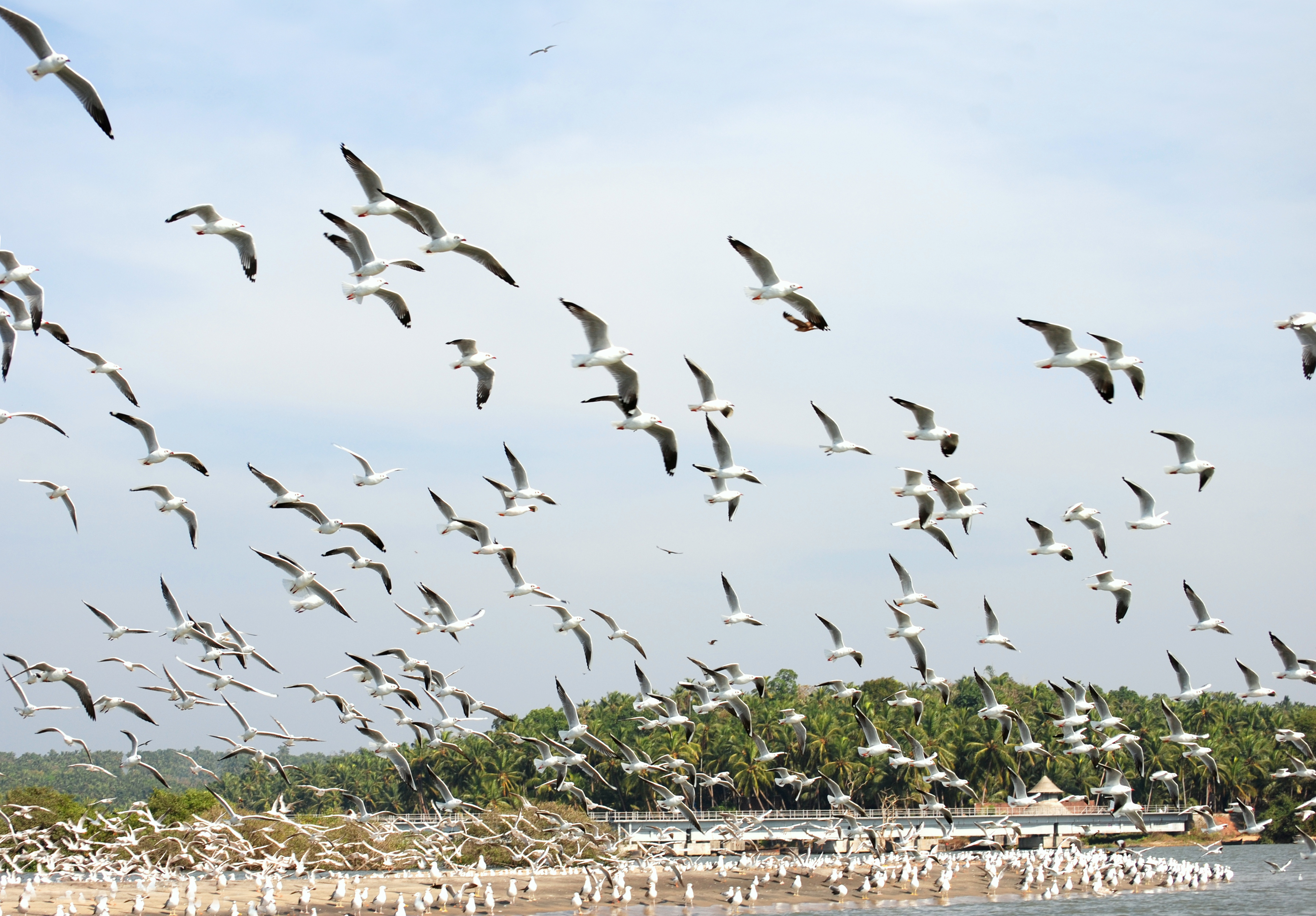
Kadalundi Bird Sanctuary

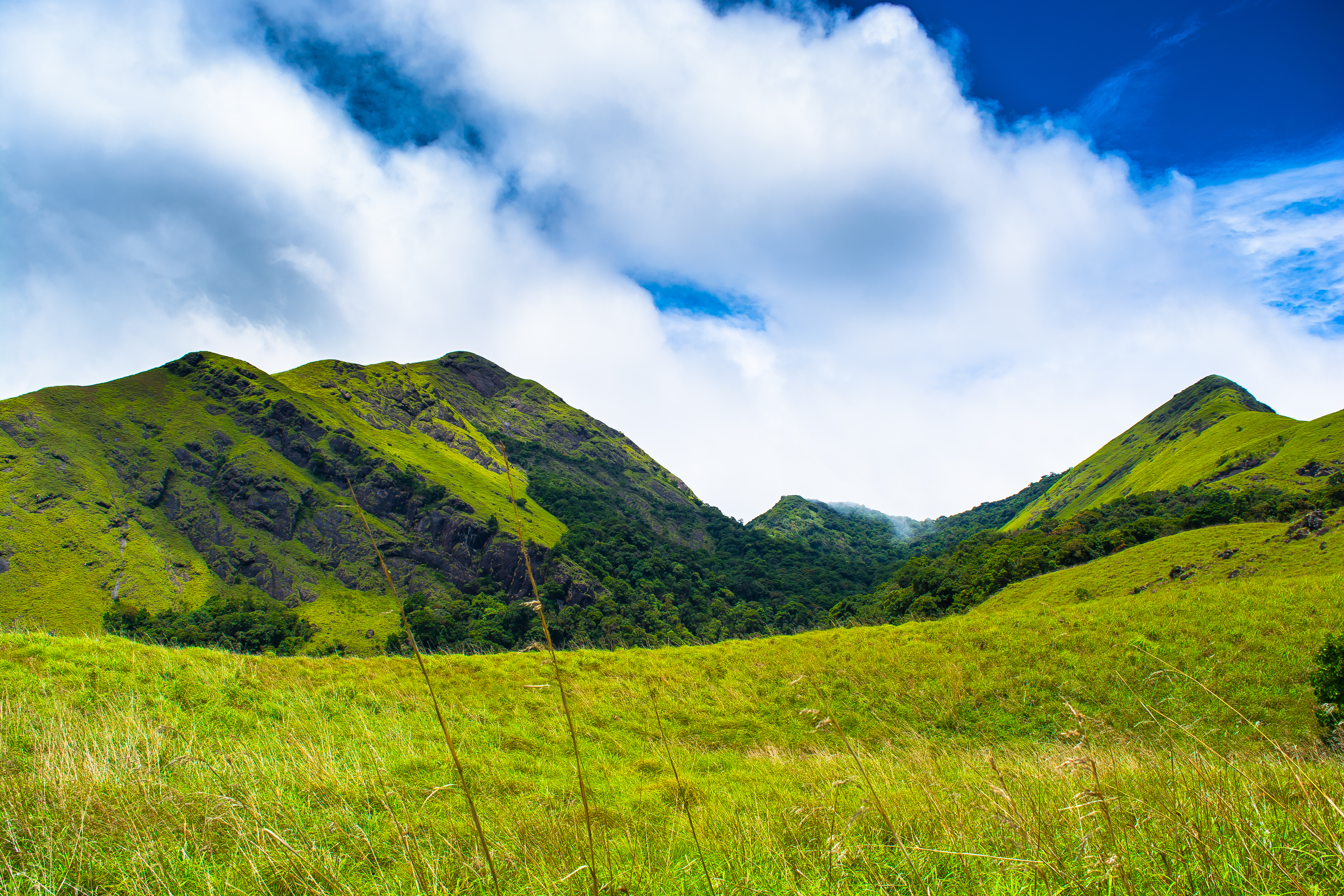
Chembra Peak, Wayanad

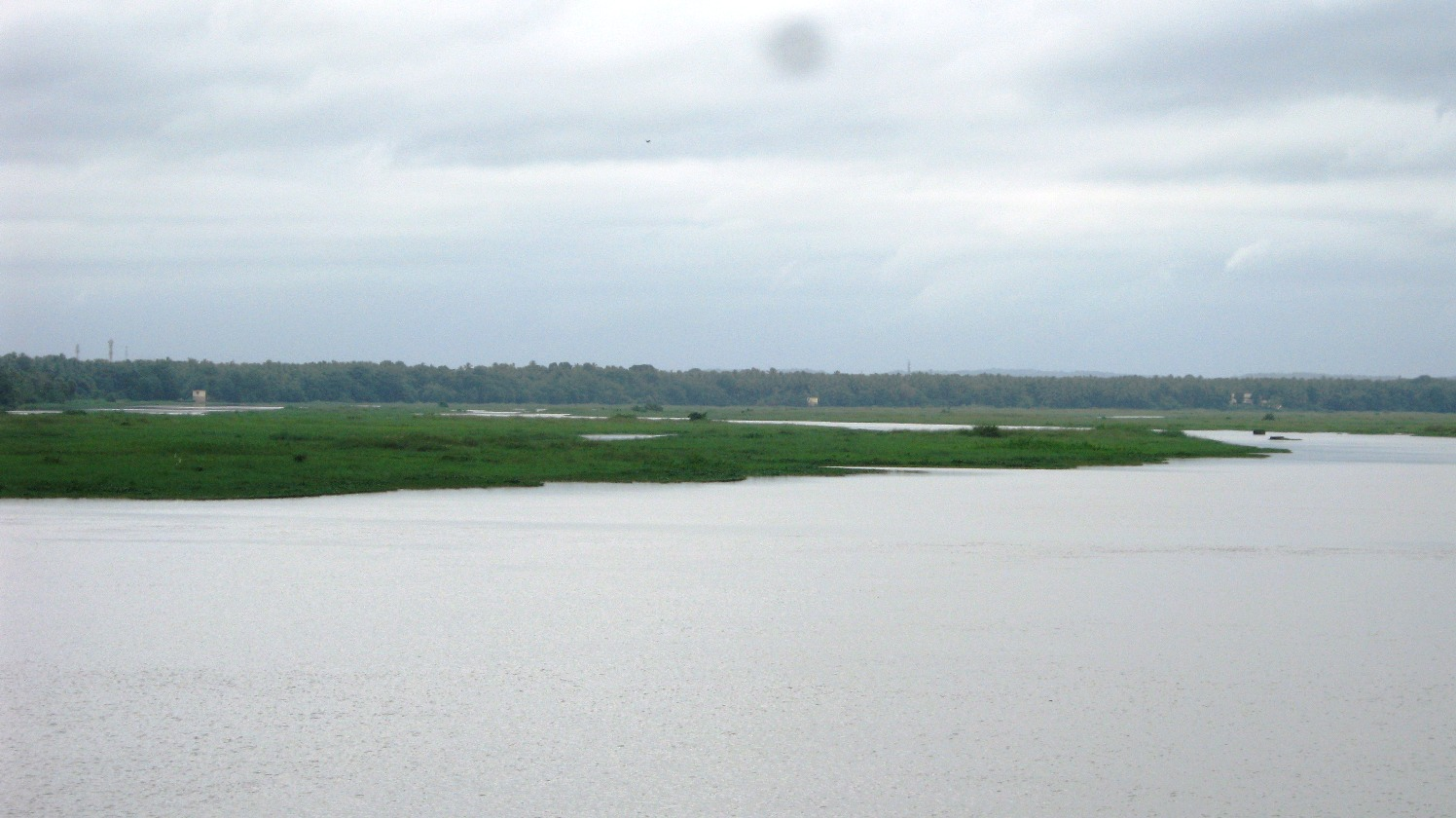
Bharathappuzha River, the second longest river in Kerala

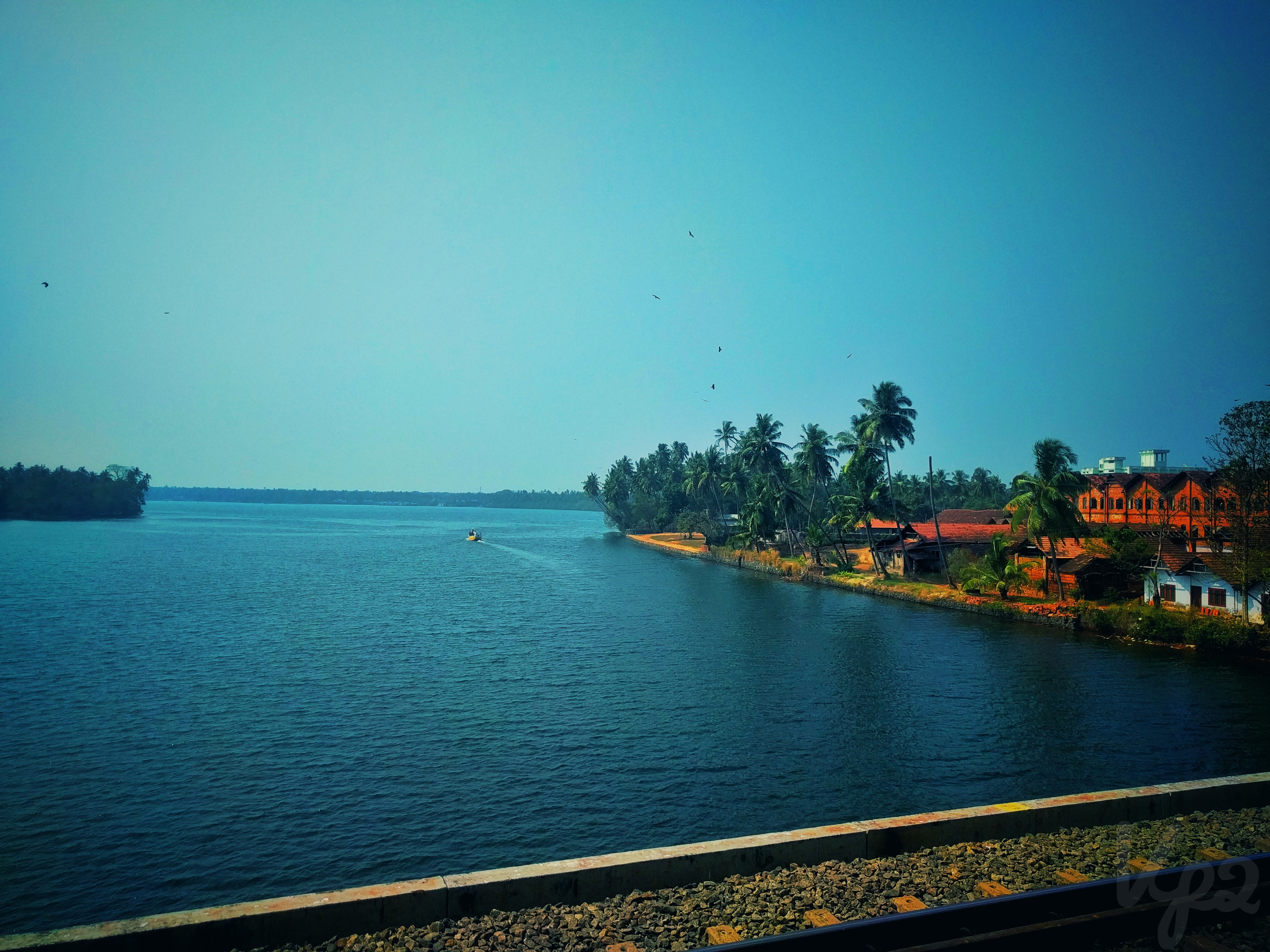
Chaliyar, the fourth longest river in Kerala

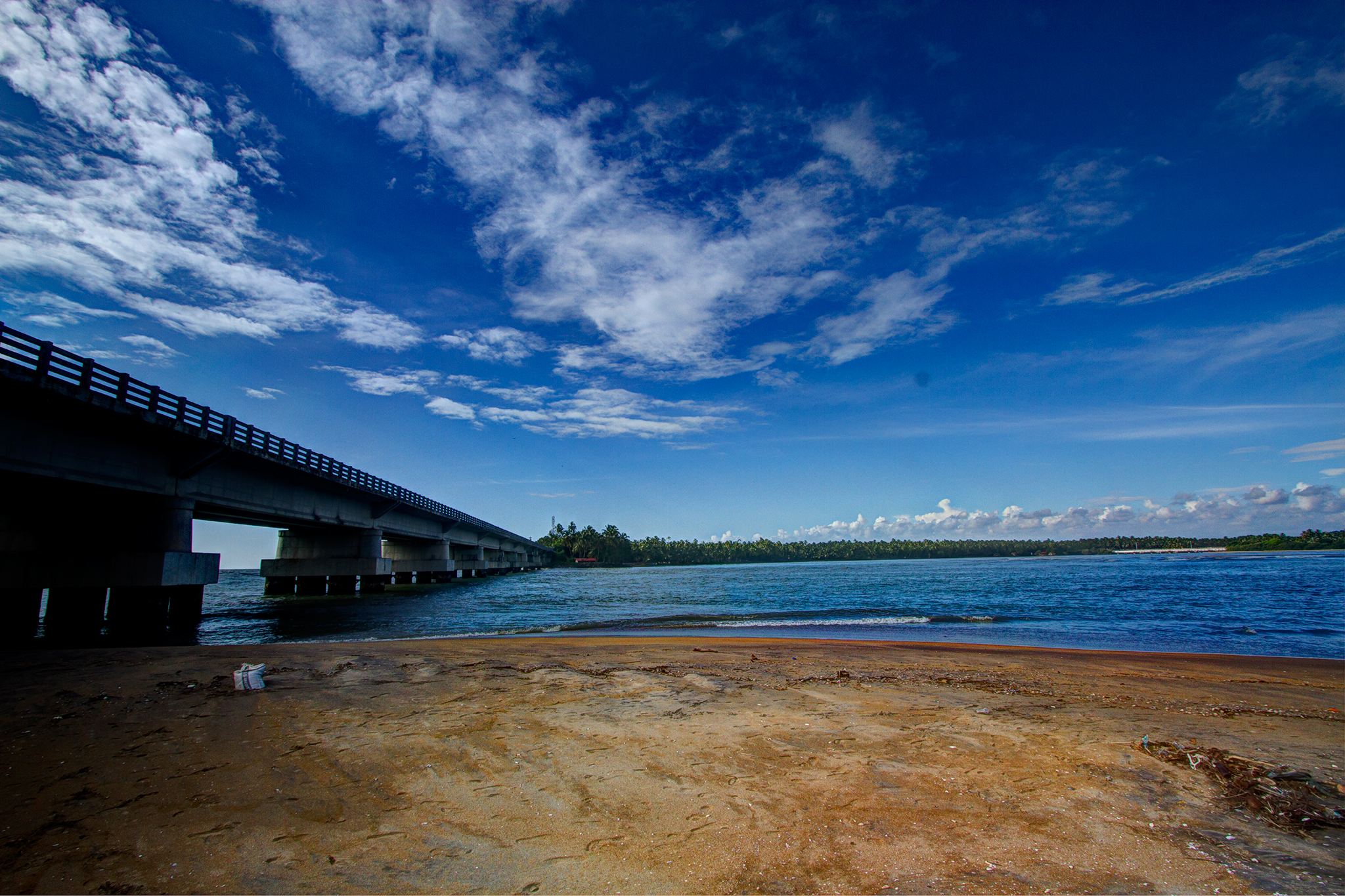
Kadalundi River, the fifth-longest river in Kerala

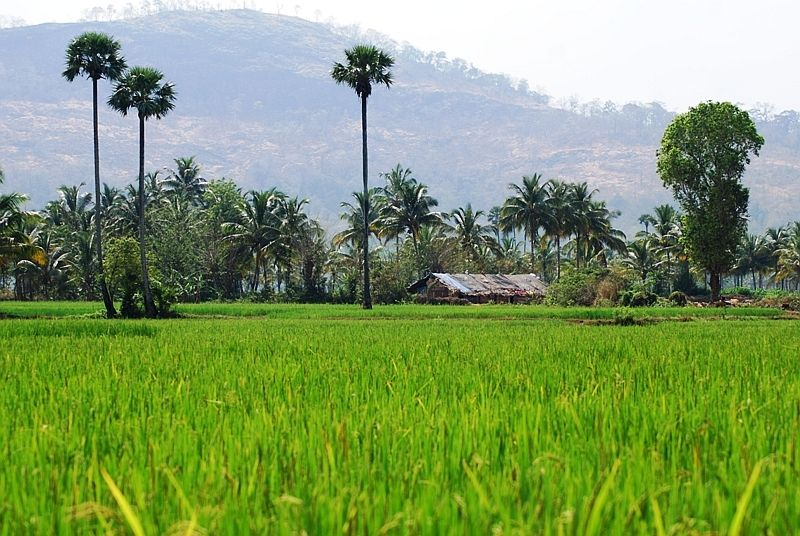
A typical Palakkadan paddy field (from Nemmara)

Malabar district, also known as the Malayalam district, bears its name from the hilly nature of many areas in the district. It was one of the two districts of Madras presidency, on the western coast (Malabar coast) of India, the other being the South Canara. The mainland area of Malabar District (excluding Lakshadweep Islands and Fort Kochi region), was surrounded by South Canara (Mangalore) to north, the princely states of Coorg and Mysore to northeast, the British districts of Nilgiris (Ooty) and Coimbatore to southeast, and the princely state of Cochin to south. North Malabar and South Malabar was divided by the river Korapuzha. Wayanad, Valluvanad, and Palakkad Taluks hadn't seacoast, whereas the remaining Taluks in the district had coastal areas. With the exception of the Lakshadweep islands, the district was wedged between the Lakshadweep Sea and the Western Ghats. Wayanad, which forms a continuation of Mysore Plateau, was the only Plateau in Malabar as well as Kerala. The district was widely scattered and consists of the following parts:-

- Malabar Proper extending north to south along the coast, a distance of around 240 kilometers, and lying between N. Lat 10° 15′ and 12° 18′ N and E.Long. 75° 14′ and 76° 56′.
- A group of nineteen isolated bits of territory lying scattered, fifteen of them in the native state of Cochin and the remaining four in those of Travancore, but all of them near the coastline. These isolated bits of territory form the taluk of British Cochin.
- Two other detached bits of land, the Tangasseri and the Anchuthengu, within the Travancore.
- Four inhabited and ten uninhabited islands of Lakshadweep. The four inhabited islands are: Agatti, Kavaratti, Androth, and Kalpeni.
- The solitary island of Minicoy.

The Western Ghats form a continuous mountain range on the eastern border of the district. Only break in the Ghats was formed by the Palakkad Gap. The western part of the district was sandy coast. The Ghats in the district maintained an average elevation of 1500 m, which might occasionally go up to 2500 m. In Kozhikode Taluk, they turned sharply eastwards and after passing the Nilambur valley in Ernad Taluk, they continued further south along the eastern portions of Ernad and Walluvanad Taluks and the northern portion of Palghat Taluk. Palakkad Gap broke the Ghats in Palghat Taluk. The highest peaks in Malabar District was located in Nilambur region on the vicinity of Nilgiri Mountains. The 2,554 m high Mukurthi peak, which is situated in the border of modern-day Nilambur Taluk and Ooty Taluk, and is also the fifth-highest peak in South India as well as the third-highest in Kerala after Anamudi (2,696 m) and Meesapulimala (2,651 m), was the highest point of elevation in Malabar district. It is also the highest peak in Kerala outside the Idukki district. The 2,383 high Anginda peak, which is located closer to Malappuram-Palakkad-Nilgiris district border is the second-highest peak. Vavul Mala, a 2,339 m high peak situated on the trijunction of Nilambur Taluk of Malappuram, Wayanad, and Thamarassery Taluk of Kozhikode districts, was the third-highest point of elevation in the district. Apart from the main continuous range of Western Ghats, there were many small undulating hills in the lowland of the district. Tropical evergreen forests were present in the mountain ranges in the district. The eastern regions in the modern-day districts of Wayanad, Malappuram (Chaliyar valley at Nilambur), and Palakkad (Attappadi Valley), which together form parts of the Nilgiri Biosphere Reserve and a continuation of the Mysore Plateau, are known for natural Gold fields, along with the adjoining districts of Karnataka.

The largest three rivers in Malabar District were, Bharathappuzha (River Ponnani), Chaliyar, Kadalundippuzha, all of them flowing through South Malabar. Valapattanam River was the largest river in North Malabar region which empties into Arabian Sea near Kannur. Two rivers flowed eastwards in the district – Kabini River in Wynad Taluk and Bhavani River in the high hills of the Walluvanad Taluk. Both of them were tributaries of the River Kaveri. Other rivers in the district were west-flowing which flows into the Arabian Sea. Coastal backwaters like Kavvayi and Biyyam were also there. The important west-flowing rivers included Valapattanam River in Chirakkal Taluk, Anjarakandi River in Kottayam Taluk, Mahé River and Kuttiadi River in Kurumbranad Taluk, Chaliyar in Ernad Taluk, Kadalundi River in Ernad and Walluvanad Taluks, and Bharathappuzha in Ponnani and Palghat Taluks. Other rivers were Kottoor, Irikkur, Vannathi, Pazhayangadi, Perumba, Kuppam, Kuttikol, and Kavvayi in Chirakkal Taluk, Bavali and Iritti in Kottayam Taluk (Bavali flows through Wynad too), Korapuzha in Kurumbranad and Kozhikode Taluks, Panamarampuzha and Manantoddy River in Wynad Taluk, Kallayi, Irittuzhi, Irungi, and Mukkam in Kozhikode Taluk, Thuthapuzha in Ponnani and Walluvanad Taluks, Olipuzha and Siruvani in Walluvanad Taluk, and Kalpathipuzha, Yakkarapuzha, and Gayathripuzha in Palghat Taluk.

== Administrative divisions ==
Malabar District during 1951 Census

Malabar district had 5 revenue divisions namely, Thalassery (Tellicherry), Kozhikode (Calicut), Malappuram, Palakkad (Palghat), and Fort Cochin and 10 Taluks within them. The plateau of Wayanad was a separate Revenue Division until 1924. Later it was merged with Thalassery.

=== Thalassery Revenue Division ===
Headquartered at Thalassery

==== Taluks ====
- Chirakkal (Area:1,750 square kilometres (677 sq mi); HQ:Chirakkal), now Kannur
- Kottayam (Area:1,270 square kilometres (489 sq mi); HQ:Kottayam), now Thalassery
- Wayanad (Area:2,130 square kilometres (821 sq mi); HQ:Mananthavady)

=== Kozhikode Revenue Division ===
Headquartered at Kozhikode

==== Taluks ====
- Kurumbranad (Area:1,310 square kilometres (505 sq mi); HQ: Vatakara.
- Kozhikode & Laccadive Islands (Area:980 square kilometres (379 sq mi); HQ: Kozhikode.

=== Malappuram Revenue Division ===
HQ: Malappuram

==== Taluks ====
- Ernad (Area:2,540 square kilometres (979 sq mi); HQ:Manjeri)
- Valluvanad (Area:2,280 square kilometres (882 sq mi); HQ:Perinthalmanna

=== Palakkad Revenue Division ===
Headquartered at Palakkad

==== Taluks ====
- Ponnani (Area:1,100 square kilometres (426 sq mi); HQ:Ponnani
- Palakkad (Area:1,670 square kilometres (643 sq mi); HQQ:Palakkad

=== Fort Cochin Revenue Division ===
Headquartered at Fort Cochin

- Cochin (Area:5.2 square kilometres (2 sq mi); HQ:Cochin)

== Demography ==
Native castes in the erstwhile Malabar District include Nambudiri Brahmin, Nair, Thiyya, Mappila, and Scheduled Castes and Tribes.

Historical population
Year	Pop.	±% p.a.
1871	2,261,250	—
1881	2,365,035	+0.45%
1891	2,652,565	+1.15%
1901	2,800,555	+0.54%
1911	3,015,119	+0.74%
1921	3,098,871	+0.27%
1931	3,533,944	+1.32%
1941	3,929,425	+1.07%
1951	4,758,842	+1.93%

Religion in Malabar District (1951)
1. Hinduism (63.2%)
2. Islam (33.5%)
3. Christianity (3.24%)
4. Other (0.02%)
Language in Malabar District (1951)
1. Malayalam (96.4%)
2. Tamil (2.52%)
3. Telugu (0.46%)
4. Other (0.61%)

Religious Demographics of Malabar District (1871&1951)
Religion		1871	1951
1	Hinduism	72.43%	63.25%
2	Islam	25.72%	33.49%
3	Christianity	1.43%	3.24%

Among various Hindu castes, Thiyyas were the most populous in the erstwhile Malabar District according to 1881 Census of India. Thiyyas formed nearly 35% of the total Hindus of Malabar in 1881 but were considered to be outside the caste system but yet they were considered shudra by some. They were present in large numbers in almost all Taluks of Malabar except Palghat, Cochin, and Laccadive Islands. Thiyyas were similar to Billavas of Tulu Nadu. In Palghat Taluk, there were Ezhavas instead of Thiyyas.

Nairs were the second-largest caste accounting for nearly 20% of the Hindu population in 1881. Their presence was scattered all over Malabar except Laccadive and Minicoy Islands. According to William Logan, the main subdivisions among the Nair of erstwhile Malabar District were Menon, Nayanar (in North Malabar), Menoky, Moopil Nair, Pada Nair, Kuruppu, Kaimal, Panikkar, Kiryathil Nair, Moothar, Oore, Kidavu, Kartha, Eradi (in Eranad and Kozhikode), Vellodi (in Valluvanad), Nedungadi (in Nedunganad), Mannadiyar (in Palakkad), and Manavalan. Nairs were similar to the Bunts of Tulu Nadu.

Ambalavasi population was higher in South Malabar, compared to that in North Malabar.

Nambudiri Brahmins, who had the highest position in caste system, were mainly concentrated around the river Bharathappuzha, mainly in the Taluks of Valluvanad and Ponnani, in South Malabar. According to 1881 Census, more than 50% of all Nambudiris in Malabar were settled in Valluvanad and Ponnani taluks. Nearly 90% of the Nambudiris of Malabar were from South Malabar, while North Malabar contributed only around 10%. Kozhikode and Eranad came next to Valluvanad and Ponnani in Namboodiri population. Azhvanchery Thamprakkal, who were the head of all Namboodiri of Kerala belong to Athavanad in erstwhile Ponnani taluk. There were some Iyer Brahmins in Palghat Taluk and Tuluva Brahmins in North Malabar.

Cherumar/Cheramar population was comparatively higher in the erstwhile Taluk of Cheranad (merged with Eranad and Ponnani in the 1860s) and its surroundings. Nearly 70% of all Cherumars of Malabar District in 1857 census were from the Taluks of Eranad, Valluvanad, Ponnani, and Palakkad. William Logan notes in his Malabar Manual that a larger number of Cherumar caste converted into Islam in the Taluks of Eranad, Ponnani, and Valluvanad during 1871–1881, comparing the census reports of 1871 and 1881.

Muslim population was higher in South Malabar compared to its northern counterparts. Muslims formed nearly 100% of population in Laccadive Islands, and more than 50% in Eranad Taluk, according to 1881 Census. Muslim population was much higher than the district average in the Taluks of Valluvanad and Ponnani too in 1881. At the same time Palakkad Taluk had the least population of Muslims in 1881. Their population was higher in former territories of the Zamorin of Calicut. Mappila Muslims of Malabar were similar to the Beary Muslims of Tulu Nadu.

Fort Cochin Taluk had the highest Christian population in Malabar while Valluvanad Taluk and Laccadive Islands had the least. The presence of Saint Thomas Christians was significant only in the southern portions of Ponnani taluk (Chavakkad region) and Fort Kochi.

The Talukwise area and population of Malabar district as of 1951 Census of India are given below:

Population and area of Malabar district (1951)
#	Taluk	Area (in sq.miles)	Population
Thalassery Division
1	Chirakkal (Kannur)	688	534,890
2	Kottayam (Thalassery)	484	369,580
3	Wayanad (Mananthavady)	821	169,280
Kozhikode Division
4	Kurumbranad (Vatakara)	506	554,091
5	Kozhikode & Laccadive Islands	380	530,364
Malappuram Division
6	Eranad (Manjeri)	978	614,283
7	Valluvanad (Perinthalmanna)	873	573,457
Palakkad Division
8	Ponnani	427	793,805
9	Palakkad	643	585,651
Fort Cochin Division
10	Fort Cochin	2	32,941
	Total	5,802	4,758,842

=== Towns and Types ===
Although there were several settlements across Malabar district during the Madras Presidency or Pre-Independence era, only a handful were officially considered as 'Towns'. Those were Cannanore, Tellicherry, Badagara, Calicut, Malappuram, Tanur, Ponnani, Palghat and Fort Kochi. The municipalities of Kozhikode, Palakkad, Fort Kochi, Kannur, and Thalassery, were formed on 1 November 1866 according to the Madras Act 10 of 1865 (Amendment of the Improvements in Towns act 1850) of the British Indian Empire, making all of them the first modern municipalities in Kerala. Even the Thiruvananthapuram municipality was formed in 1920 (54 years later).

=== Abbreviations ===
M: Municipality:	Towns with a local governing body constituted under Madras Town Improvement Act of 1865.
T: Non Municipal Town:	Towns without a governing body, listed in Madras District Records.
C: Cantonment	Towns with a Military base in Madras Presidency.
A.C: Administrative Center:	Towns supporting administrative headquarters of higher order.

Cities/Towns of Malabar district during the late 1800s (1881), Early 1900s (1901), and Mid 1900s (1941)
City/Town	Year Declared	Type	Taluk	Revenue Division	Population
Pre-Independence / Late 1800s					(1881)
Kozhikode	1866	M, C, AC	Kozhikode	Kozhikode	57,085
Palakkad	1866	M, AC	Palghat	Palghat	36,339
Thalassery	1866	M, AC	Kottayam	Tellicherry	26,410
Kannur	1866	M, C	Chirakkal	Tellicherry	26,386
Fort Kochi	1866	M, AC	Fort Cochin	Fort Cochin	15,698
Early 1900s					(1901)
Badagara	1902	T	Kurumbranad	Kozhikode	11,319
Ponnani	1902	T	Ponnani	Palghat	10,562
Malappuram	1904	T, C, AC	Ernad	Malappuram	9,216
Tanur	1912	T	Ponnani	Palghat	8,409
Mid 1900s					(1941)
Pandalayini (Koyilandy)	1941	T	Kurumbranad	Kozhikode	12,713
Feroke	1941	T	Ernad	Malappuram	6,249
Manjeri	1941	T	Ernad	Malappuram	5,547
Trikkandiyur (Tirur)	1941	T	Ponnani	Palghat	9,489

==== 1951 Census of India ====
The settlements with a population of more than 50,000 were considered as cities and those had between 10,000 and 50,000 were considered as towns. The following table gives the cities and towns of Malabar district classified by their population as of the 1951 Census:

Cities and towns of Malabar district (1951)
City/Town	Taluk	Population (1951)
Cities
Kozhikode	Kozhikode	158,724
Palakkad	Palghat	69,504
Towns
Kannur	Chirakkal	42,431
Thalassery	Kottayam	40,040
Fort Kochi	Fort Cochin	29,881
Panthalayini (Koyilandy)	Kurumbranad	29,001
Ponnani	Ponnani	23,606
Ottapalam	Walluvanad	22,695
Badagara	Kurumbranad	20,964
Feroke	Ernad	19,463
Tanur	Ponnani	17,888
Trikkandiyur (Tirur)	Ponnani	11,830
Shoranur	Walluvanad	11,596
Manjeri	Ernad	10,357
Total		507,975

=== Local bodies ===
At the time of 1951 Census of India, Malabar District was divided into 5 Municipalities and 100 Panchayat Boards. Among them 2 municipalities (Kozhikode and Palakkad) were treated as cities. The municipalities were Kozhikode, Palakkad, Kannur, Thalassery, and Fort Cochin. The other towns mentioned above, i.e., Shoranur, Ottapalam, Manjeri, Ponnani, Tanur, Trikkandiyur (Tirur), Feroke, Pandalayini (Quilandy), and Badagara, were treated as Panchayat towns. The Taluk-wise details of 5 Municipalities and 100 Panchayat Boards under Malabar District Board at that time are given below:

Abbreviations
T: TOWN
It maybe either a Municipal Town or a Non-Municipal Town. The settlements exceeding a population of 10,000 and had some sort of economic importance were considered as towns according to 1951 Census of India
C: CITY
The Municipalities exceeding a population of 50,000 and had larger economic importance were treated as cities according to 1951 Census of India
TELLICHERRY DIVISION
Chirakkal Taluk (10)
Cannanore Municipality (T)
1. Payyanur	2. Karivellur-Peralam	3. Ramanthali
4. Cheruthazham-Kunhimangalam	5. Azhikode	6. Pappinisseri
7. Kankole	8. Baliapatam	9. Chirakkal
10. Puzhathi		
Kottayam Taluk (15)
Tellicherry Municipality (T)
11. Panoor	12. Kuthuparamba	13. Kadirur
14. Kariyad	15. Dharmadom	16. Kottayam
17. Eranholi	18. Eruvatty	19. Peringalam
20. Pinarayi	21. Pathiriyad	22. Olavilam
23. Vadakkumpad	24. Menapram	25. Kodiyeri
Wynad Taluk (8)
26. Thavinhal	27. Manantoddy	28. Thirunelly
29. Kalpetta	30. Vythiri	31. Meppadi
32. Kidanganad	33. Vellamunda	
KOZHIKODE DIVISION
Kurumbranad Taluk (14)
34. Badagara (T)	35. Cheruvannur	36. Unnikulam
37. Eramala	38. Balussery	39. Edacheri
40. Kunnummakkara	41. Meppayur	42. Villiappally
43. Nadapuram	44. Chorode	45. Panthalayani (Koyilandy) (T)
46. Veloor	47. Karthikappalli	
Kozhikode Taluk (3)
Kozhikode Municipality (C)
48. Beypore	49. Thamarassery	50. Koduvally
MALAPPURAM DIVISION
Ernad Taluk (5)
51. Nilambur	52. Nediyiruppu	53. Manjeri (T)
54. Kondotty	55. Kottakkal	
Walluvanad Taluk (10)
56. Shoranur (T)	57. Ottapalam (T)	58. Pattambi
59. Thiruvegappura	60. Perinthalmanna	61. Cherpulassery
62. Perur	63. Kuruvattoor	64. Vaniyamkulam
65. Karakkad		
PALGHAT DIVISION
Ponnani Taluk (21)
66. Ponnani (T)	67. Kalpakanchery	68. Trikkandiyur (Tirur) (T)
69. Tanur Nagaram	70. Tanur (T)	71. Ozhur
72. Andathode	73. Vadakkekad	74. Attupuram
75. Vylathur	76. Veliyankode	77. Ayiroor
78. Maranchery	79. Kottapadi	80. Chavakkad
81. Chittaattukara	82. Elavally	83. Pavaratty
84. Kundazhiyur	85. Venkitangu	86. Engandiyur
Palghat Taluk (14)
Palghat Municipality (C)
87. Peringottukurissi	88. Kottayi	89. Tholanur
90. Vadakkencherry	91. Kizhakkancherry	92. Kollengode
93. Vadavannur	94. Pallassana	95. Koduvayur
96. Thenur	97. Elappully	98. Kattusseri
99. Paruthipully	100. Mankara	
FORT COCHIN DIVISION
Fort Cochin Taluk (0)
Fort Cochin Municipality (T)

== Politics ==
=== Representatives from Malabar to Madras State ===
- In C. Rajagopalachari Ministry: 1) Kongattil Raman Menon (1937–39), 2) C. J. Varkey, Chunkath (1939)
- In Prakasam Ministry: 1) R. Raghavamenon (1946–47)
- In Ramaswami Reddyar Ministry: 1) Kozhippurathu Madhavamenon (1947–49)
- In P. S. Kumaraswami Ministry: 1) Kozhippurathu Madhavamenon (1949–52)
- In C. Rajagopalachari Ministry: 1) K. P. Kuttikrishnan Nair (1952–54) Kalladi Unnikammu Sahib

=== 1951–52 Indian general election ===
In the first election to the Lok Sabha conducted under the provisions of the Indian Constitution after Independence, Malabar district had five constituencies, Kannur, Thalassery, Kozhikode, Malappuram and Ponnani.

	Constituency	Winner	Party	Runner-up	Party
1	Kannur	A. K. Gopalan	CPI	C.K.K Govindan Nayar	INC
1	Kannur	A. K. Gopalan	CPI	K.S.Subramania Iyer	IND
2	Thalassery	Nettur P. Damodaran	KMPP	P. Kunhiraman	INC
2	Thalassery	Nettur P. Damodaran	KMPP	P.M.V Kunhiraman Nambiar	SP
3	Kozhikode	Achuthan Damodaran Menon	KMPP	Ummar Koya Parappil	INC
3	Kozhikode	Achuthan Damodaran Menon	KMPP	Ramakrislina Naick, R.N. Ruhur	IND
4	Malappuram	B. Pocker Sahib Bahadur	IUML	T.V. Chathukutty Nair	INC
4	Malappuram	B. Pocker Sahib Bahadur	IUML	Kumhali Karikedan	CPI
5	Ponnani	K. Kelappan	KMPP	Karunakara Menon	INC
5	Ponnani	Vella Eacharan Iyyani	INC	Massan Gani	IND

=== 1952 Madras Legislative Assembly election ===
25 State Legislative Assembly constituencies were allotted from the Malabar District to the First Assembly of Madras State. 4 of them were dual-member constituencies. The total number of seats in the district was 29 (including dual member constituencies).

	Constituency	Winner	Party	Runner-up	Party
1	Nattika	Gopalakrishnan	CPI	Raman	INC
2	Ponnani	N. Gopala Menon	INC	K. C. Sankarann	INC
2	Ponnani	E. T. Kunhan	CPI	A. C. Raman	KMPP
3	Tirur	K. Uppi Saheb	IUML	K. Ahmad Kutty	INC
4	Thrithala	K. B. Menon	SP	P. K. Moideen Kutty	INC
5	Perinthalmanna	Kunhimahamad Shafee Kallingal	IUML	P. Ahmad Kutty Sadhu	CPI
6	Mannarkkad	K. C. Gopalanunni	IND	Kurikal Ahmed	IND
7	Pattambi	V. Sankara Narayana Menon	KMPP	A. Ramachandra Nedungadi	INC
8	Ottapalam	M. Narayana Kurup	KMPP	C. P. Madhavan Nair	INC
9	Palakkad	K. Ramakrishnan	IND	P. Vasu Menon	INC
10	Alathur	K. Krishnan	CPI	Y. R. Ramanatha Iyer	IND
10	Alathur	O. Koran	KMPP	E. Eacharan	INC
11	Malappuram	Miniyadam Chadayan	IUML	Karupadata Ibrahim	INC
11	Malappuram	Mohammad Haje Seethi	IUML	Kallayan Kunhambu	INC
12	Kottakkal	Chakkeeri Ahmad Kutty	IUML	Kunjunni Nedumgadi, Ezhuthassan Kalathil	INC
13	Kozhikode	K. P. Kutty Krishnan Nair	INC	E. M. S. Namboodiripad	CPI
14	Chevayur	A. Appu	INC	Ayyadhan Balagopalan	KMPP
15	Wayanad	Manyangode Padmanabha Gounder	SP	Kozhipurath Madhava Menon	INC
15	Wayanad	Chomadi Velukkan	SP	Veliyan Nocharamooyal	INC
16	Koyilandy	Chemmaratha Kunhriramakurup	KMPP	Anantapuram Patinhare Madam Vasudevan Nair	INC
17	Perambra	Kunhiram Kidavu Polloyil	KMPP	Kalandankutty, Puthiyottil	INC
18	Vadakara	Moidu Keloth	SP	Ayatathil Chathu	INC
19	Nadapuram	E. K. Sankara Varma Raja	INC	K. Thacharakandy	CPI
20	Thalassery	C. H. M. Kanaran	CPI	K. P. M. Raghavan Nair	INC
21	Kuthuparamba	Krishna Iyer	IND	Harindranabham, Kalliyat Thazhathuveethil	SP
22	Mattanur	Madhavan Nambiar, Kallorath	CPI	Subbarao	INC
23	Kannur	Kariath Sreedharan	KMPP	Pamban Madhavan	INC
24	Taliparamba	T. C. Narayanan Nambiar	CPI	V. V. Damodaran Nayanar	INC
25	Payyanur	K. P. Gopalan	CPI	Vivekananda Devappa Sernoy	INC

== Malabar Cuisine ==
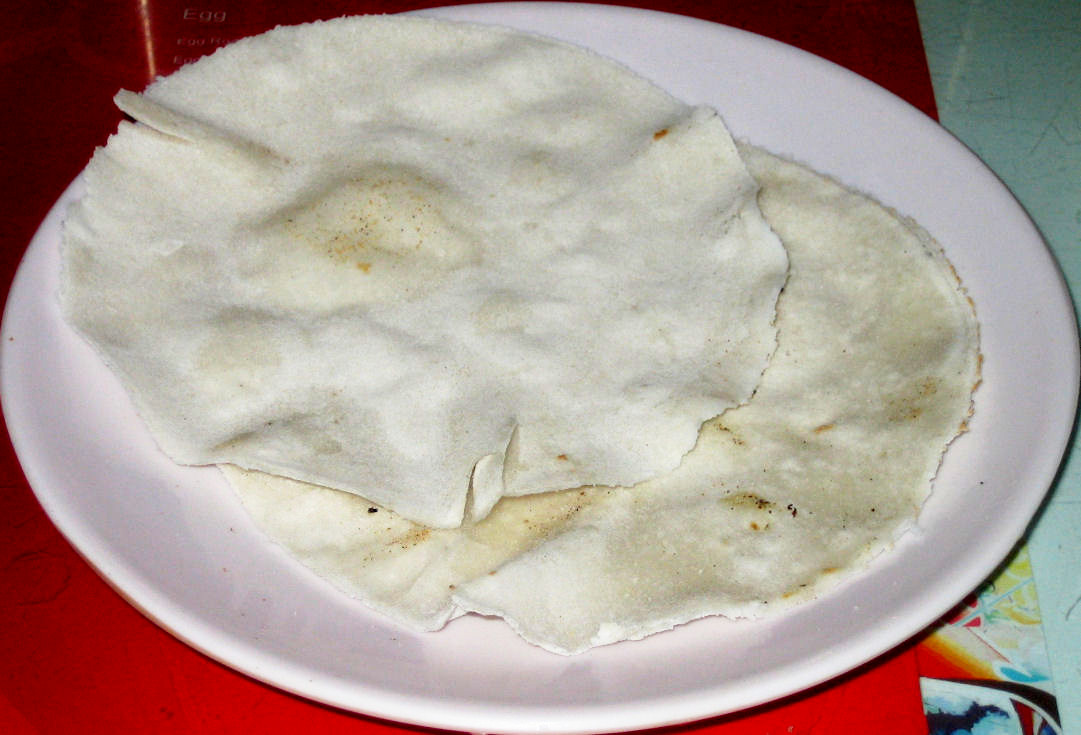
Pathiri, a pancake made of rice flour, is one of the common breakfast dishes in Kannur

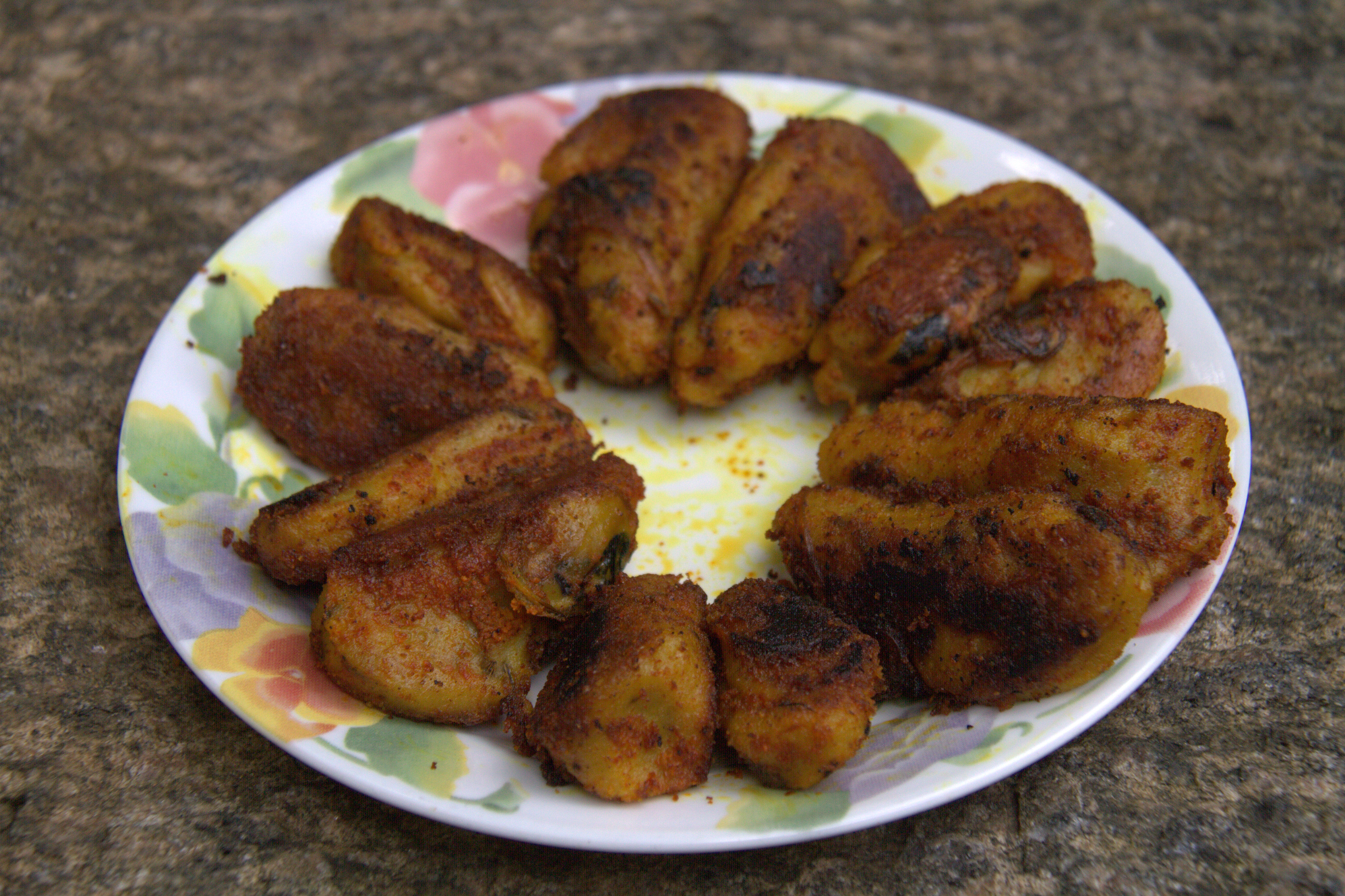
Kallummakkaya nirachathu or arikkadukka (mussels stuffed with rice)

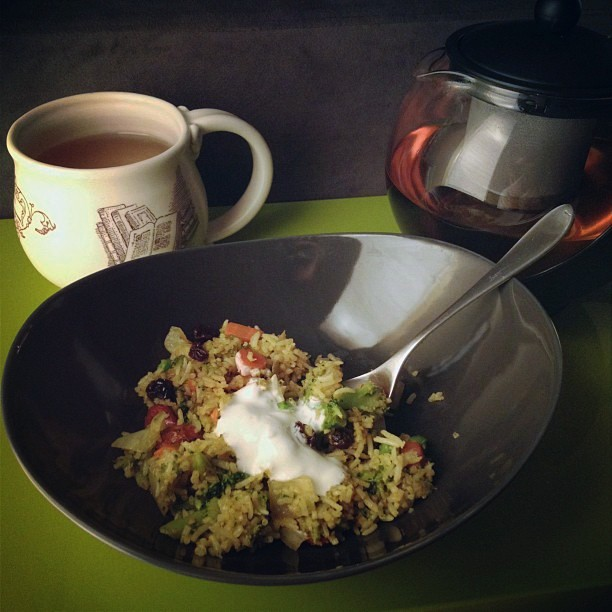
Thalassery biryani with raita

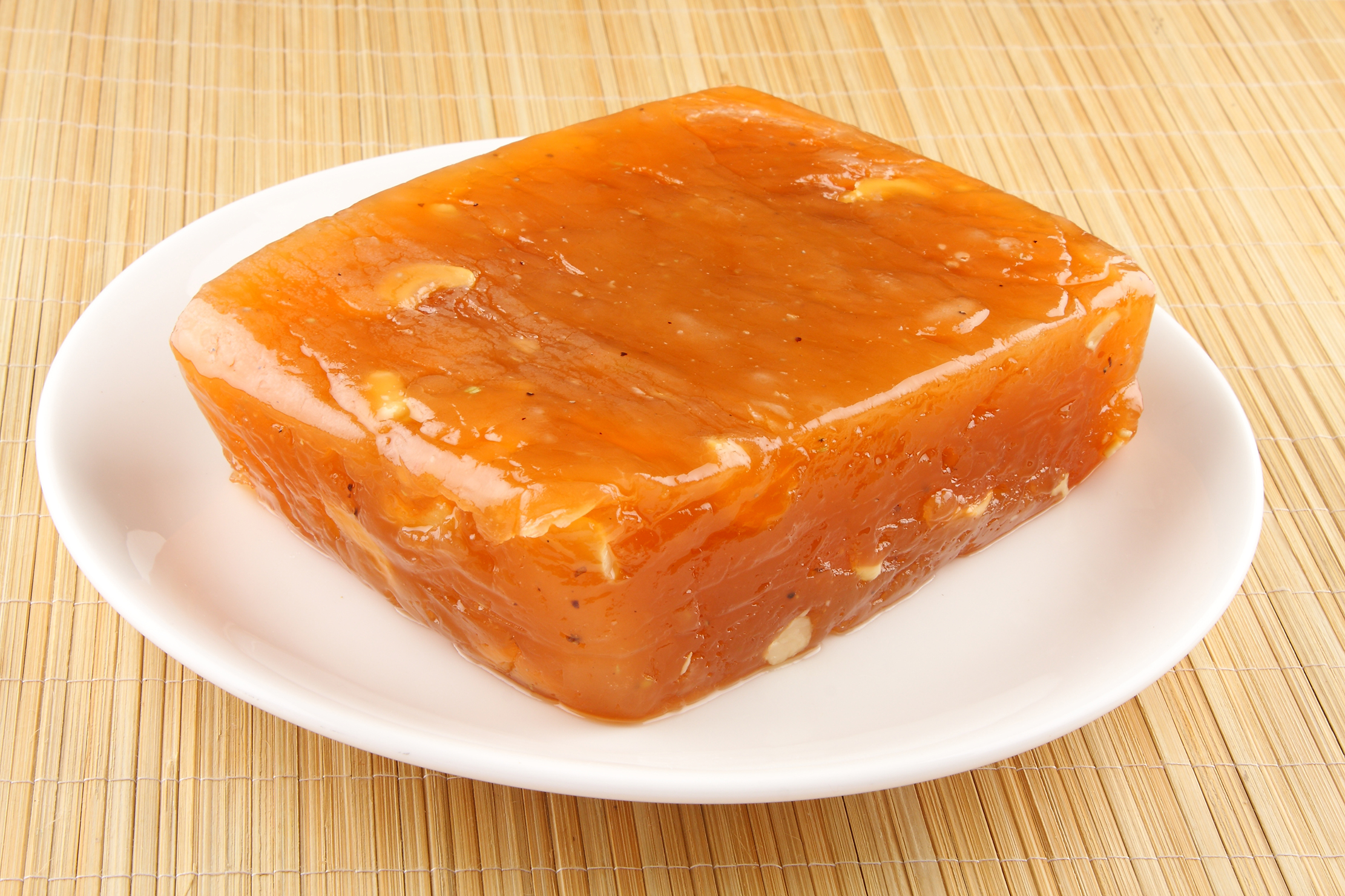
Halwas are popular in towns like Kannur, Thalassery, Kozhikode, and Ponnani

The Malabar cuisine depicts it culture and heritage. It is famous for Malabar biriyani. The city of Calicut is also famous for Haluva called as Sweet Meat by Europeans due to the texture of the sweet. Kozhikode has a main road in the town named Mittai Theruvu (Sweet Meat Street, or S.M. Street for short). It derived this name from the numerous Halwa stores which used to dot the street.

Another speciality is banana chips, which are made crisp and wafer-thin. Other popular dishes include seafood preparations (prawns, mussels, mackerel) . Vegetarian fare includes the sadya.

Malabar cuisine is a blend of traditional Kerala, Persian, Yemenese and Arab food culture. This confluence of culinary cultures is best seen in the preparation of most dishes. Kallummakkaya (mussels) curry, irachi puttu (irachi meaning meat), parottas (soft flatbread), Pathiri (a type of rice pancake) and ghee rice are some of the other specialties. The characteristic use of spices is the hallmark of Malabar cuisine—black pepper, cardamom and clove are used profusely.

The Malabar version of biryani, popularly known as kuzhi mandi in Malayalam is another popular item, which has an influence from Yemen. Various varieties of biriyanis like Thalassery biriyani, Kannur biriyani, Calicut biriyani and Ponnani biriyani are prepared in Malabar.

The snacks include unnakkaya (deep-fried, boiled ripe banana paste covering a mixture of cashew, raisins and sugar), pazham nirachathu (ripe banana filled with coconut grating, molasses or sugar), muttamala made of eggs, chatti pathiri, a dessert made of flour, like a baked, layered chapati with rich filling, arikkadukka, and more.

== Notable people from Malabar ==
- List of people from North Malabar
- List of people from South Malabar

== Modern day taluks and islands in erstwhile Malabar ==
District	Taluk/Island
Kasaragod district	Kasaragod
Kasaragod district	Manjeshwaram
Kasaragod district	Hosdurg
Kasaragod district	Vellarikundu
Kannur district	Taliparamba
Kannur district	Kannur
Kannur district	Payyanur
Kannur district	Thalassery
Kannur district	Iritty
Wayanad district	Mananthavady
Wayanad district	Sulthan Bathery
Wayanad district	Vythiri (Kalpetta)
Kozhikode district	Vatakara
Kozhikode district	Koyilandy
Kozhikode district	Kozhikode
Kozhikode district	Thamarassery
Nilgiris district	Gudalur
Nilgiris district	Pandalur
Malappuram district	Tirurangadi
Malappuram district	Eranad (Manjeri)
Malappuram district	Nilambur
Malappuram district	Perinthalmanna
Malappuram district	Kondotty
Malappuram district	Tirur
Malappuram district	Ponnani
Palakkad district	Mannarkkad
Palakkad district	Ottappalam
Palakkad district	Palakkad
Palakkad district	Pattambi
Palakkad district	Alathur
Palakkad district	Chittur
Thrissur district	Chavakkad
Thrissur district	Kodungallur (parts)
Ernakulam district	Fort Kochi
Lakshadweep	Agatti
Lakshadweep	Andrott
Lakshadweep	Bangaram
Lakshadweep	Kalpeni
Lakshadweep	Kavaratti
Lakshadweep	Minicoy

== Historical maps ==
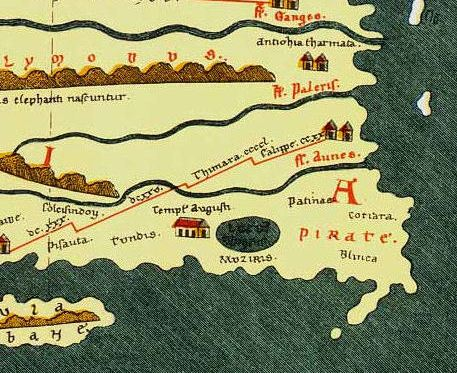
Malabar Coast around AD 1st century CE

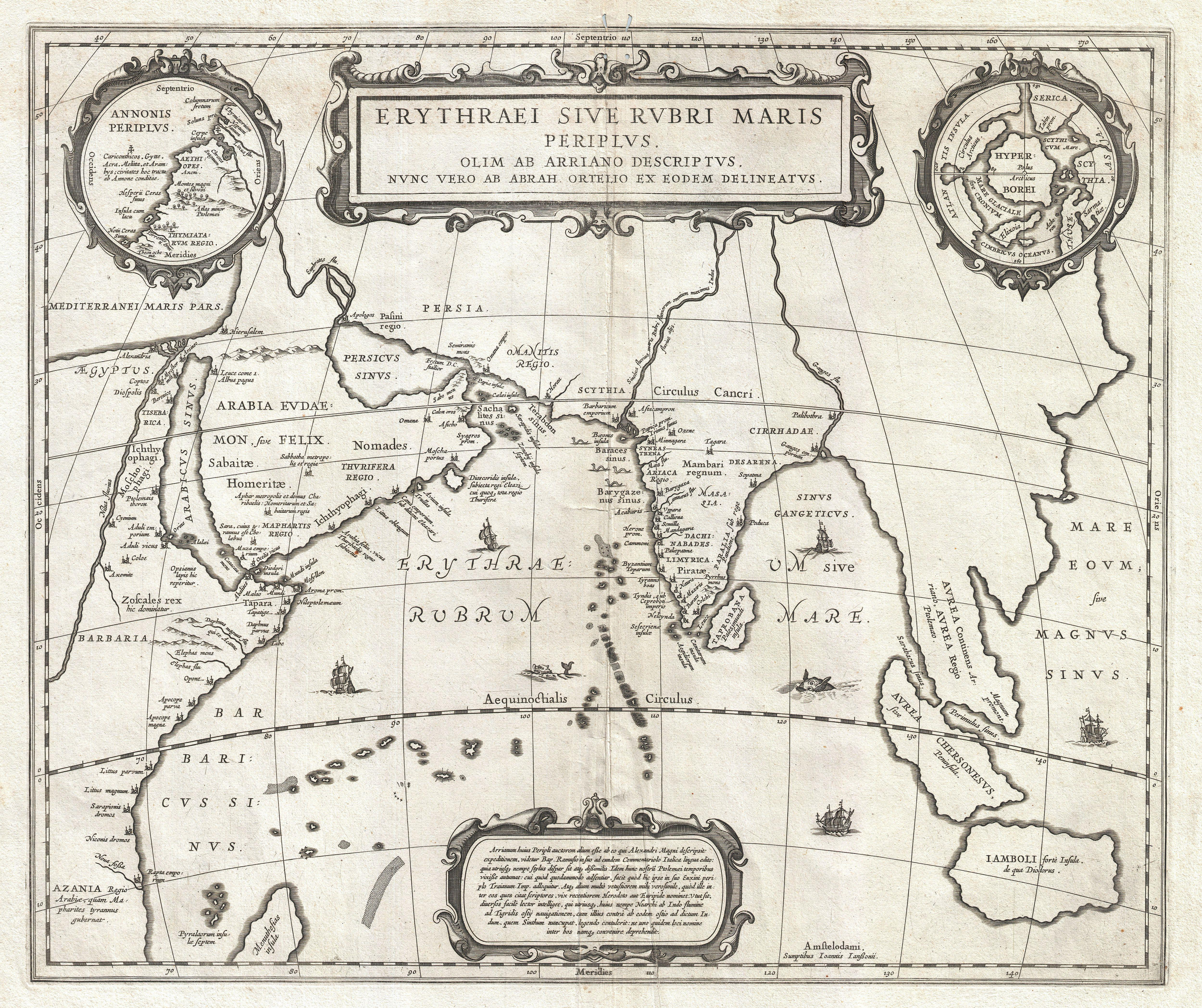
Major ports in 1st century CE according to the Periplus of the Erythraean Sea

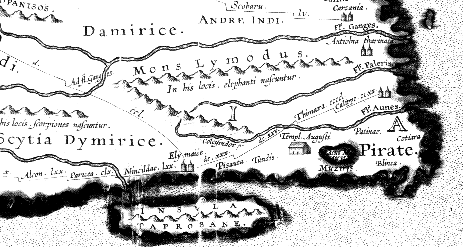
Malabar Coast around AD 300 (4th century CE)

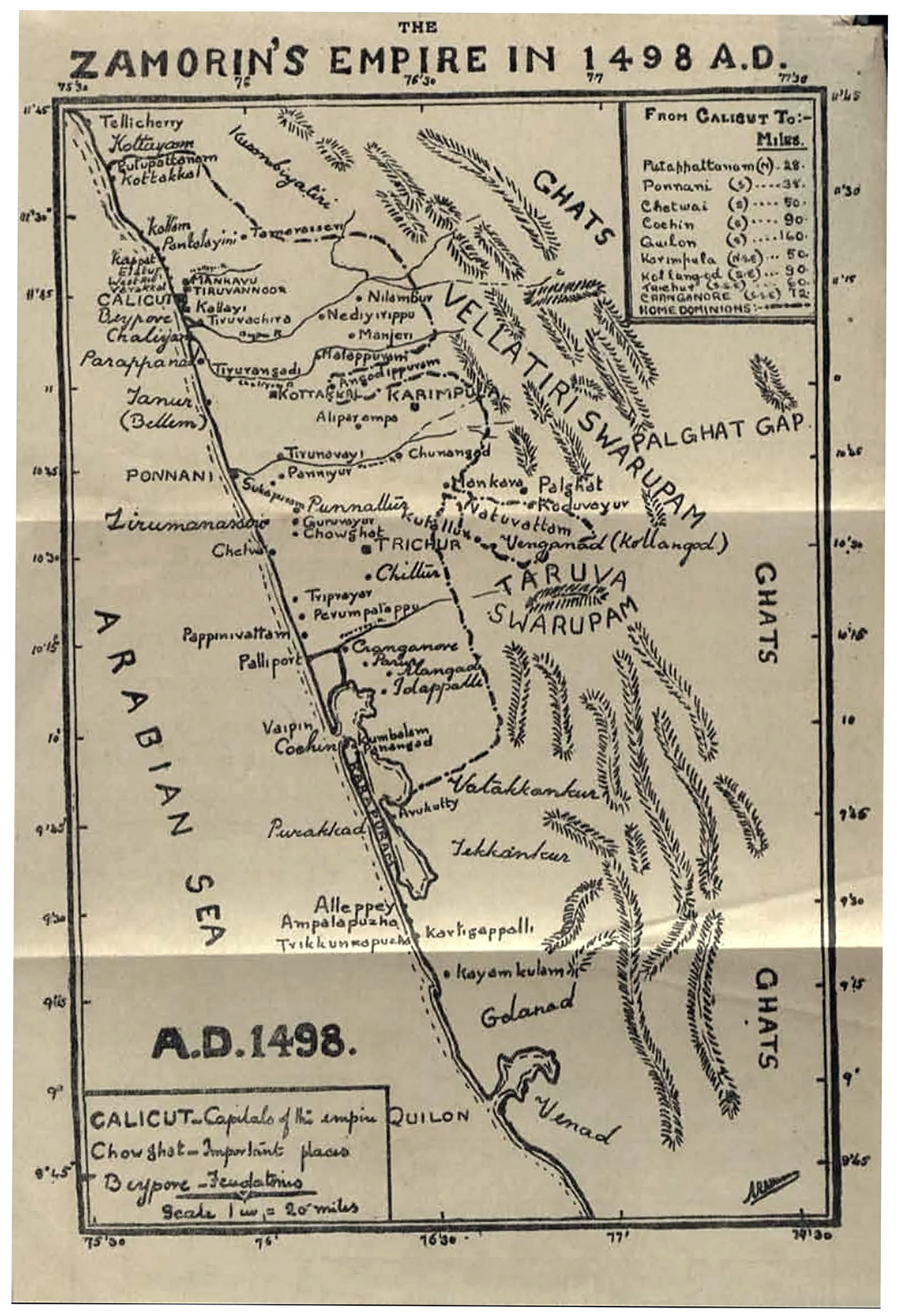
Zamorin of Calicut's empire in 1498

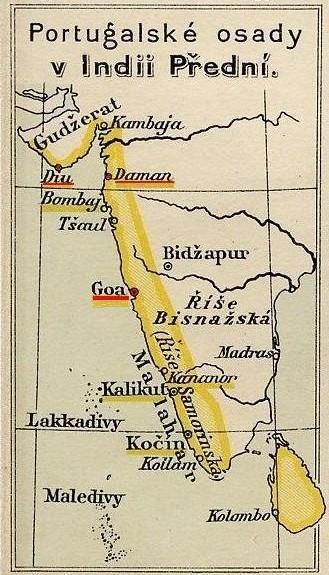
Malabar Coast in Portuguese India (16th century CE)

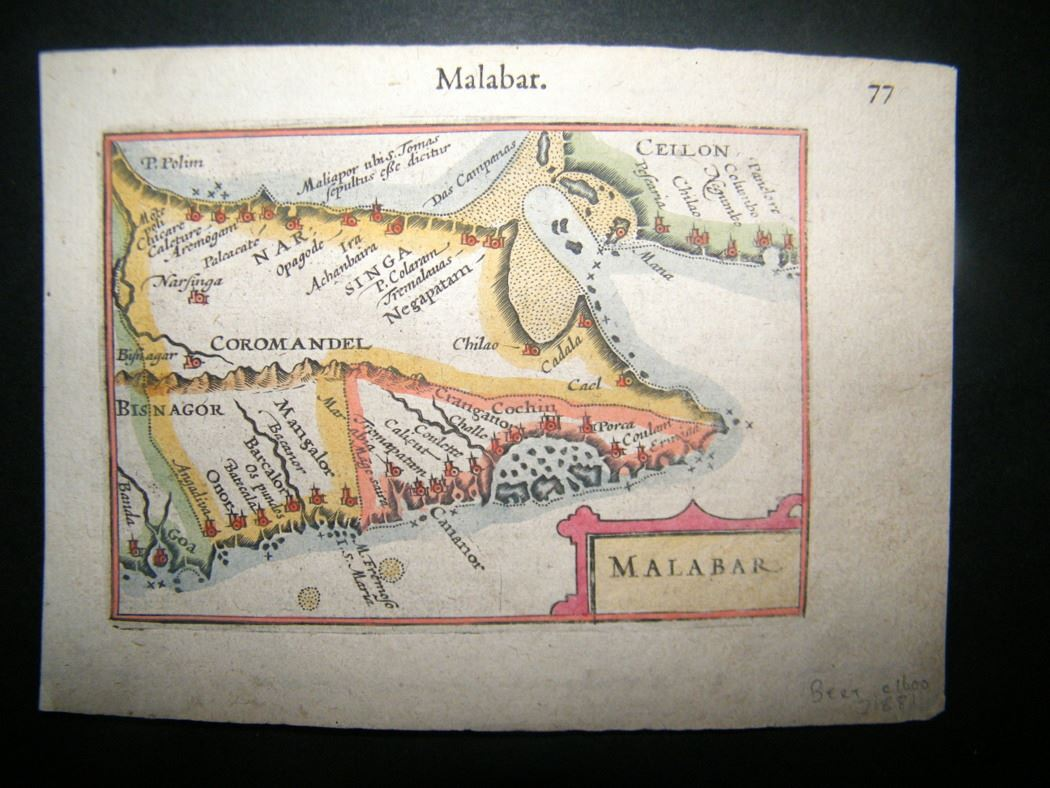
Malabar Coast in the early 17th century (1600–1618)

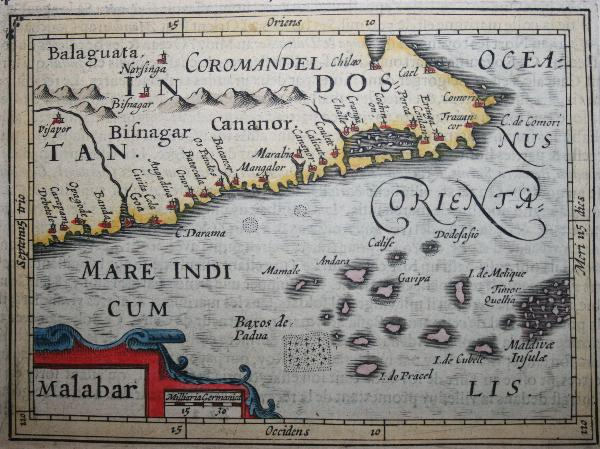
A horizontal Malabar Coast miniature map by Abraham Ortelius, Antwerp, c.1580, from the Epitome Theatri Orteliani; *a reprint by Petrus Bertius, 1630*; and *another Bertius version*, Amsterdam, c.1600-18

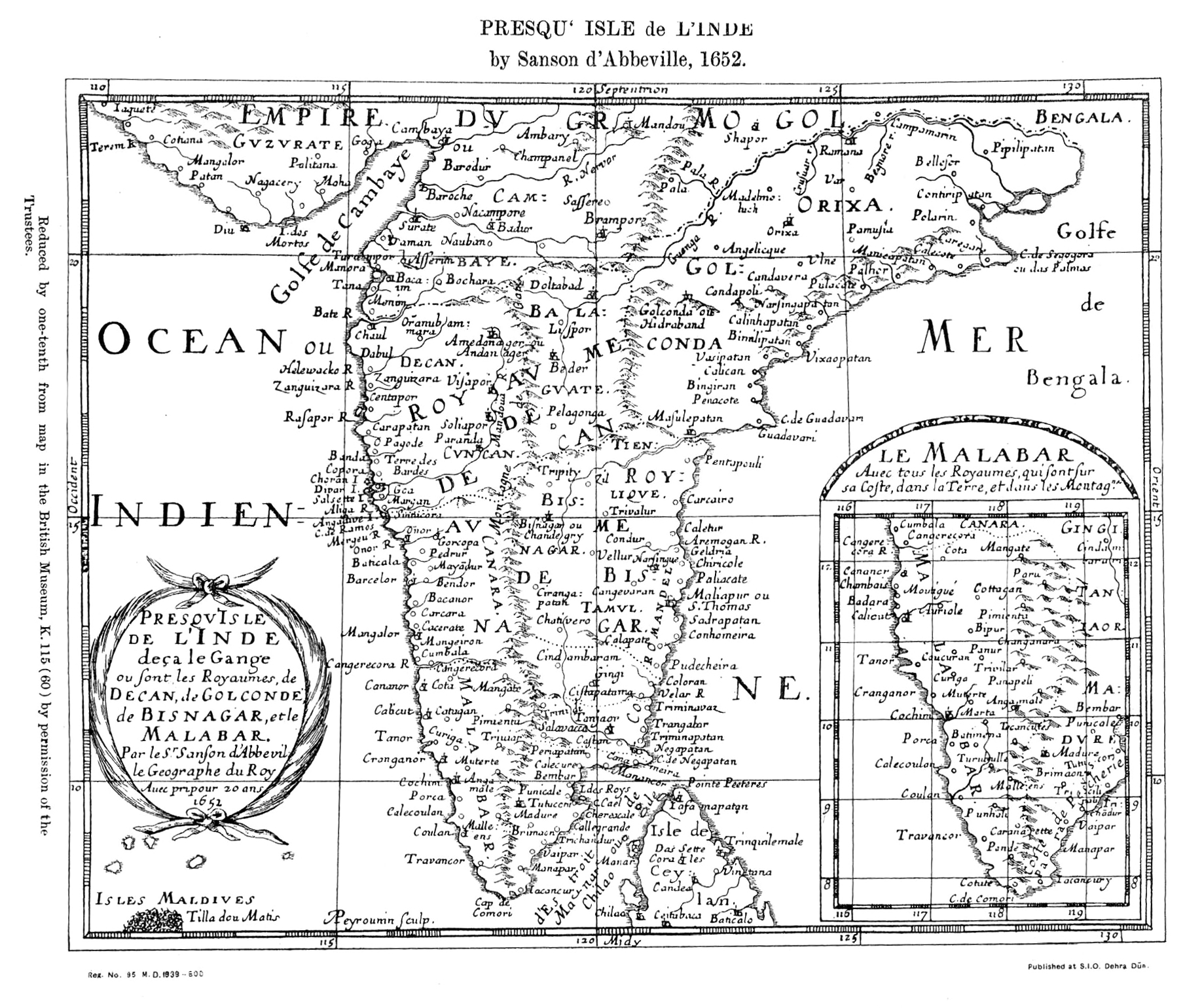
Malabar in 1652 (Malabar Coast is highlighted separately on the right side)

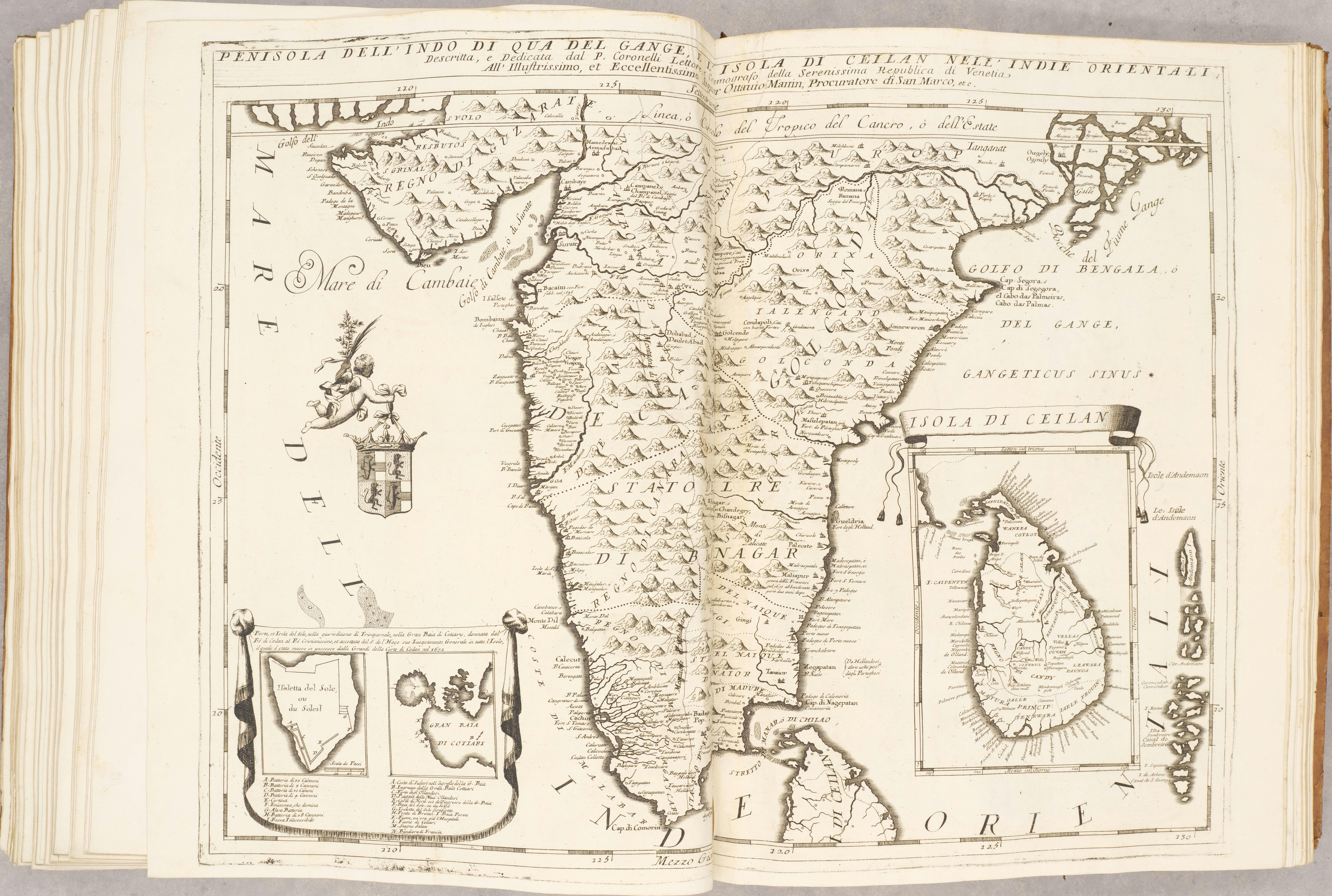
South India in 1691-92 (Calicut is marked in large letters).

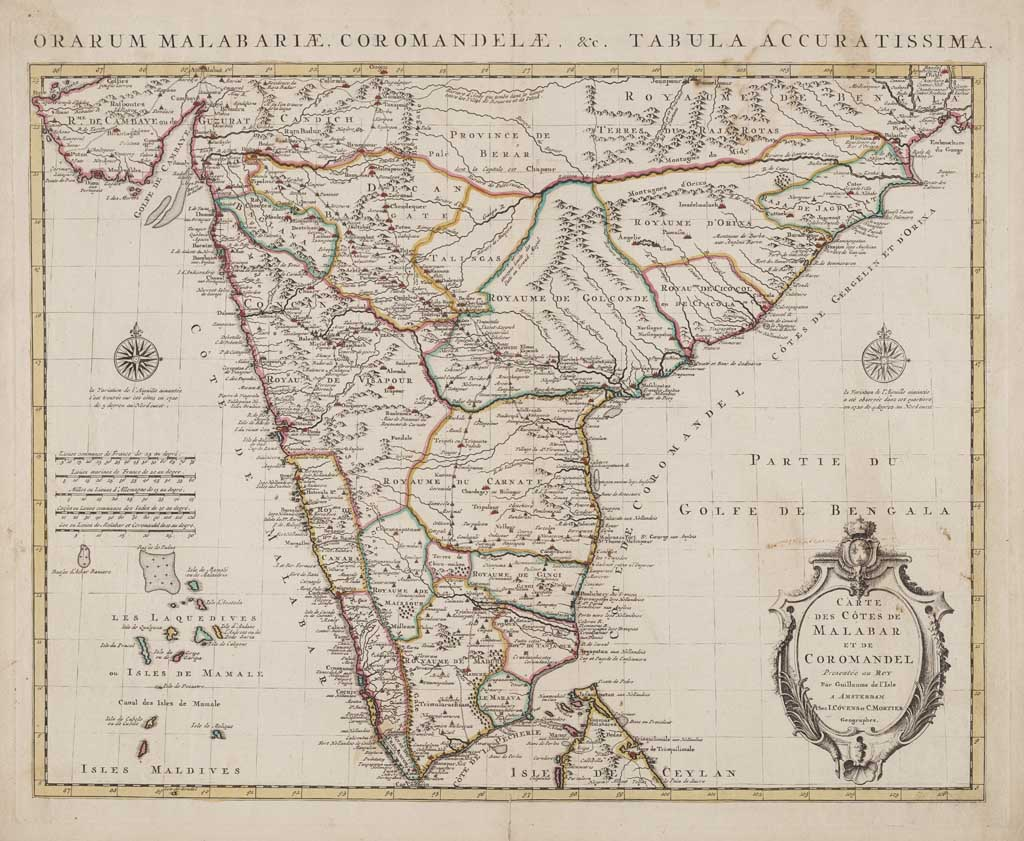
A map in which the entire western coast of India is termed as Malabar Coast (drawn in the mid-18th century CE)

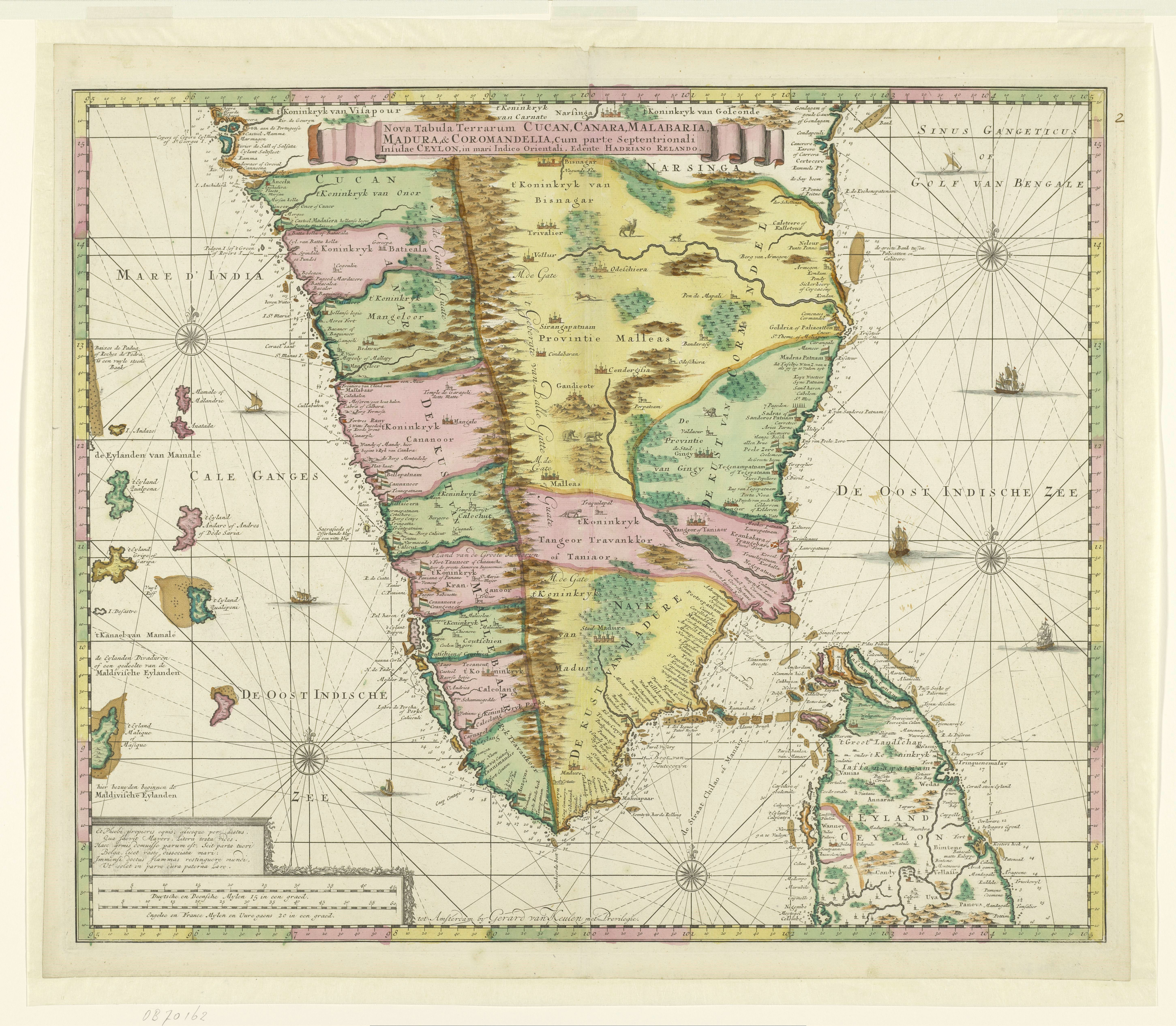
Kaart van Zuid-India Nova tabula terrarum Cucan, Canara, Malabaria, Madura, & Coromandella, cum parte septentrionali insulae Ceylon, in mari Indico Orientali edente Hadriano Relando (titel op object)

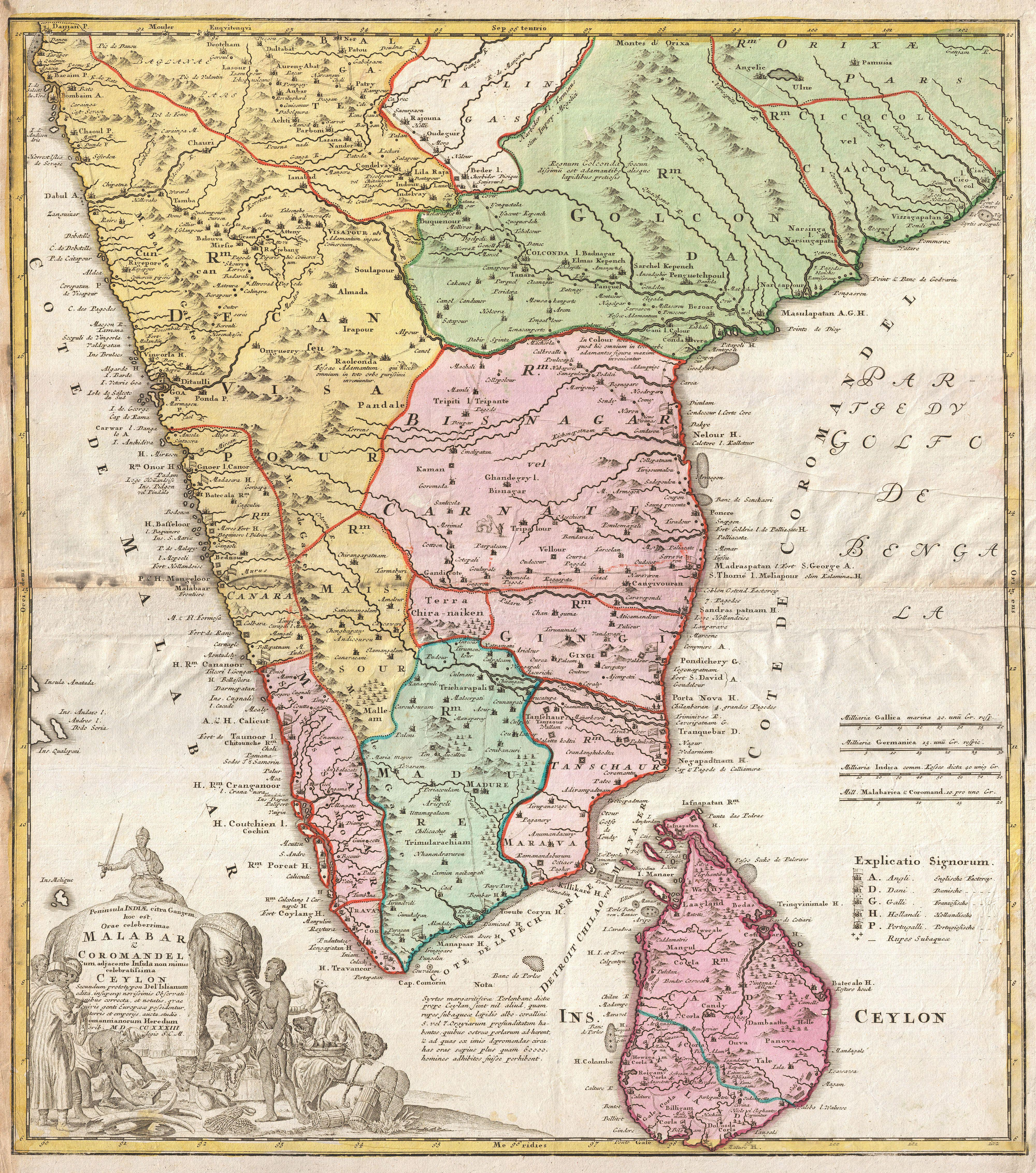
A rare map of India and Ceylon issued in 1733 by the Homann Heirs.

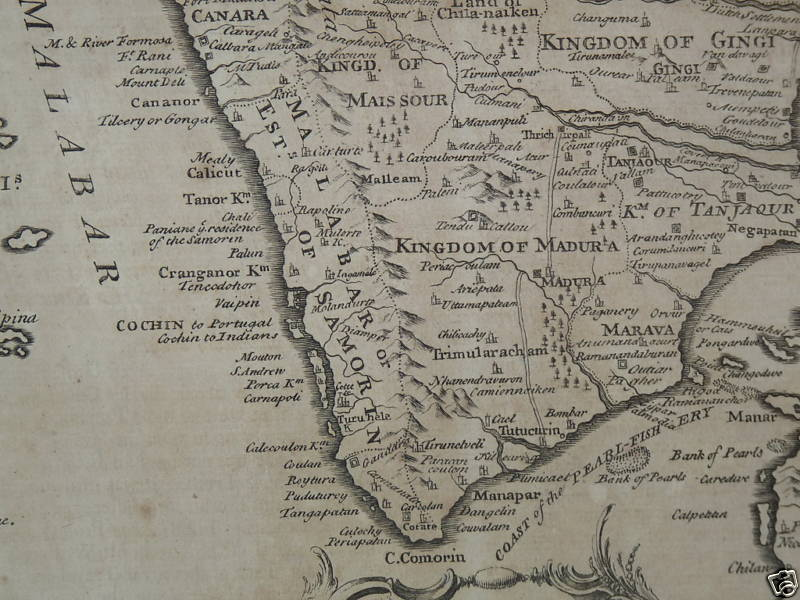
A map of South India drawn by Emanuel Bowen (1744)

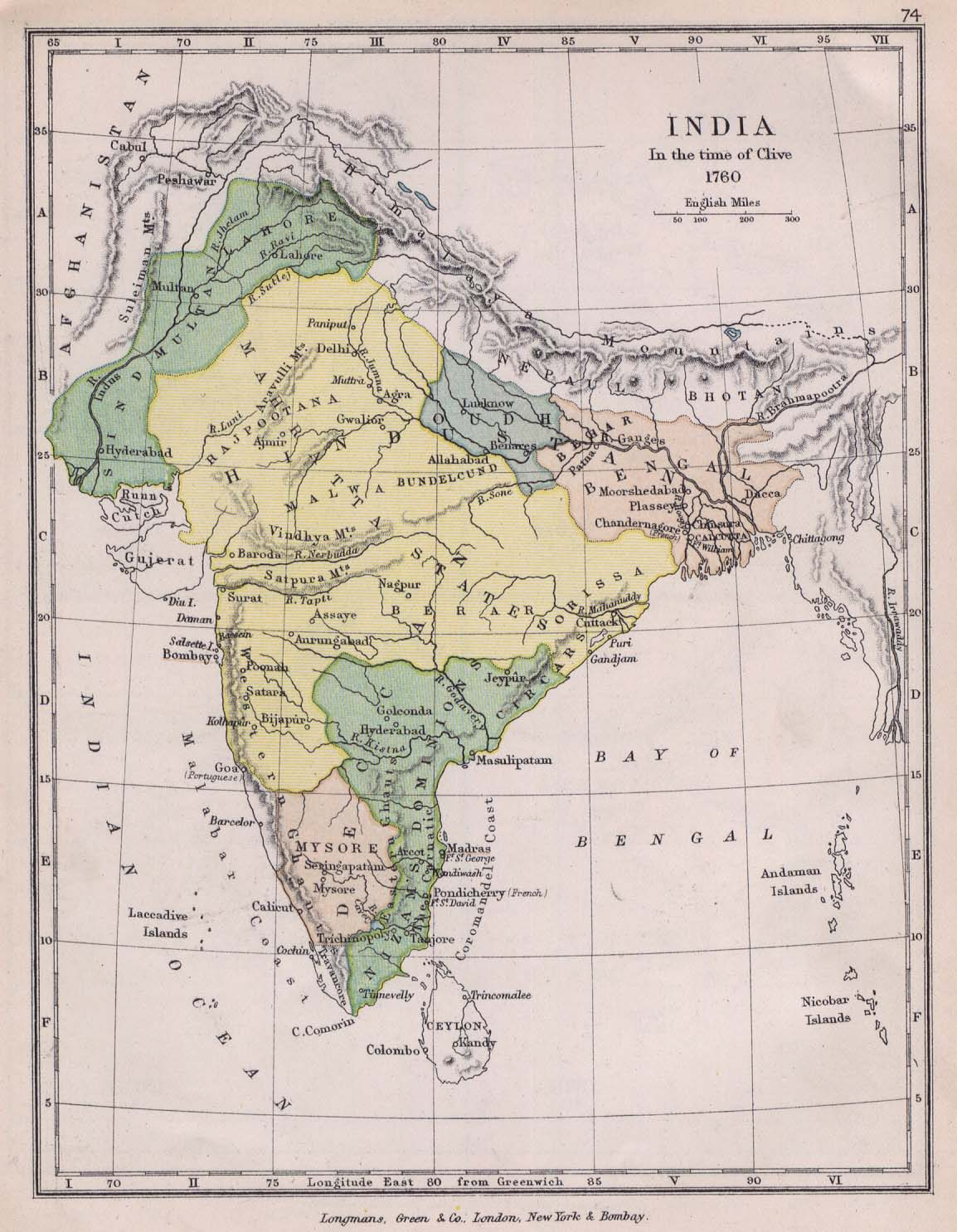
Indian subcontinent in 1760

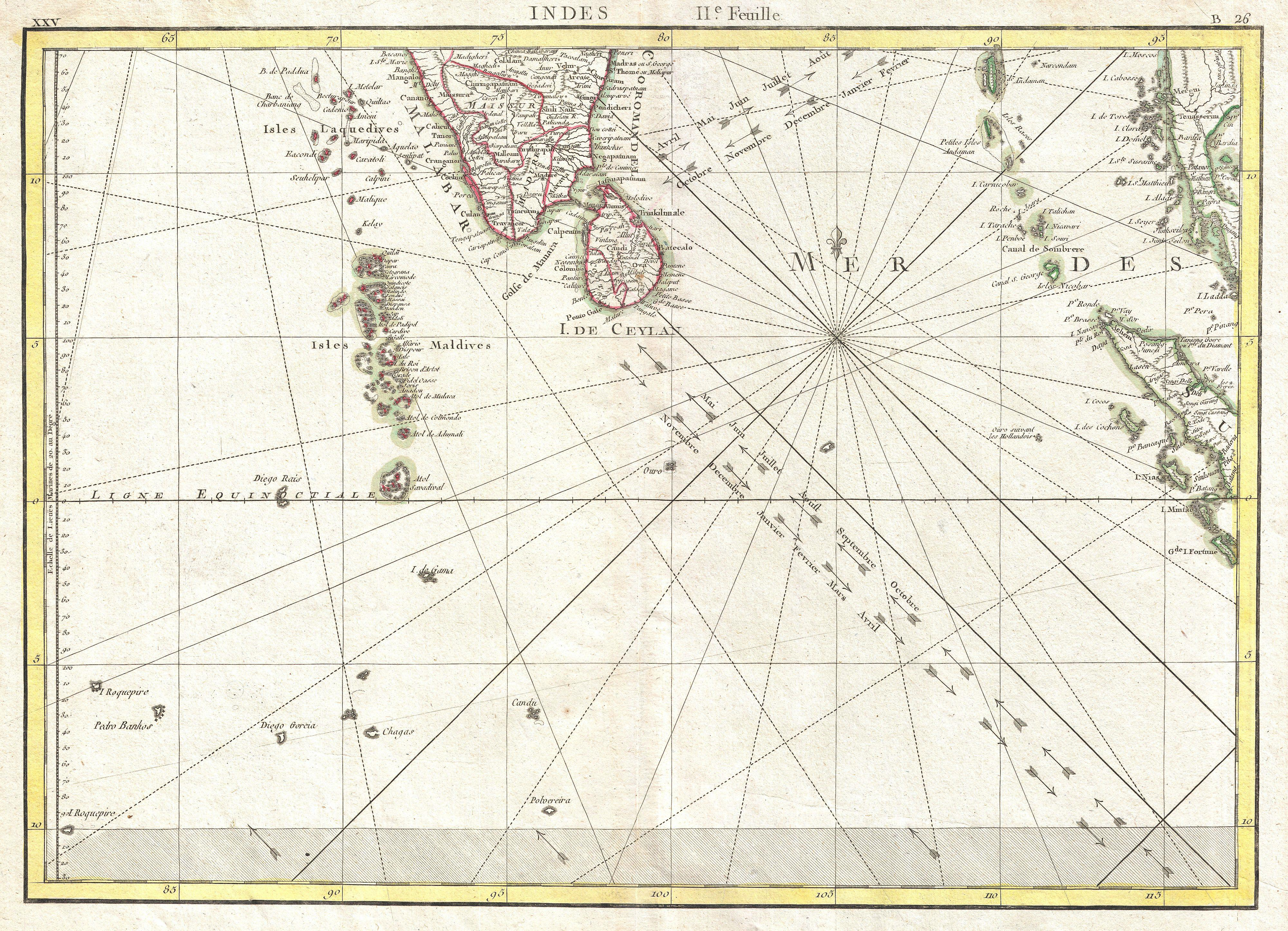
Rigobert Bonne's 1770 decorative map of southern India.

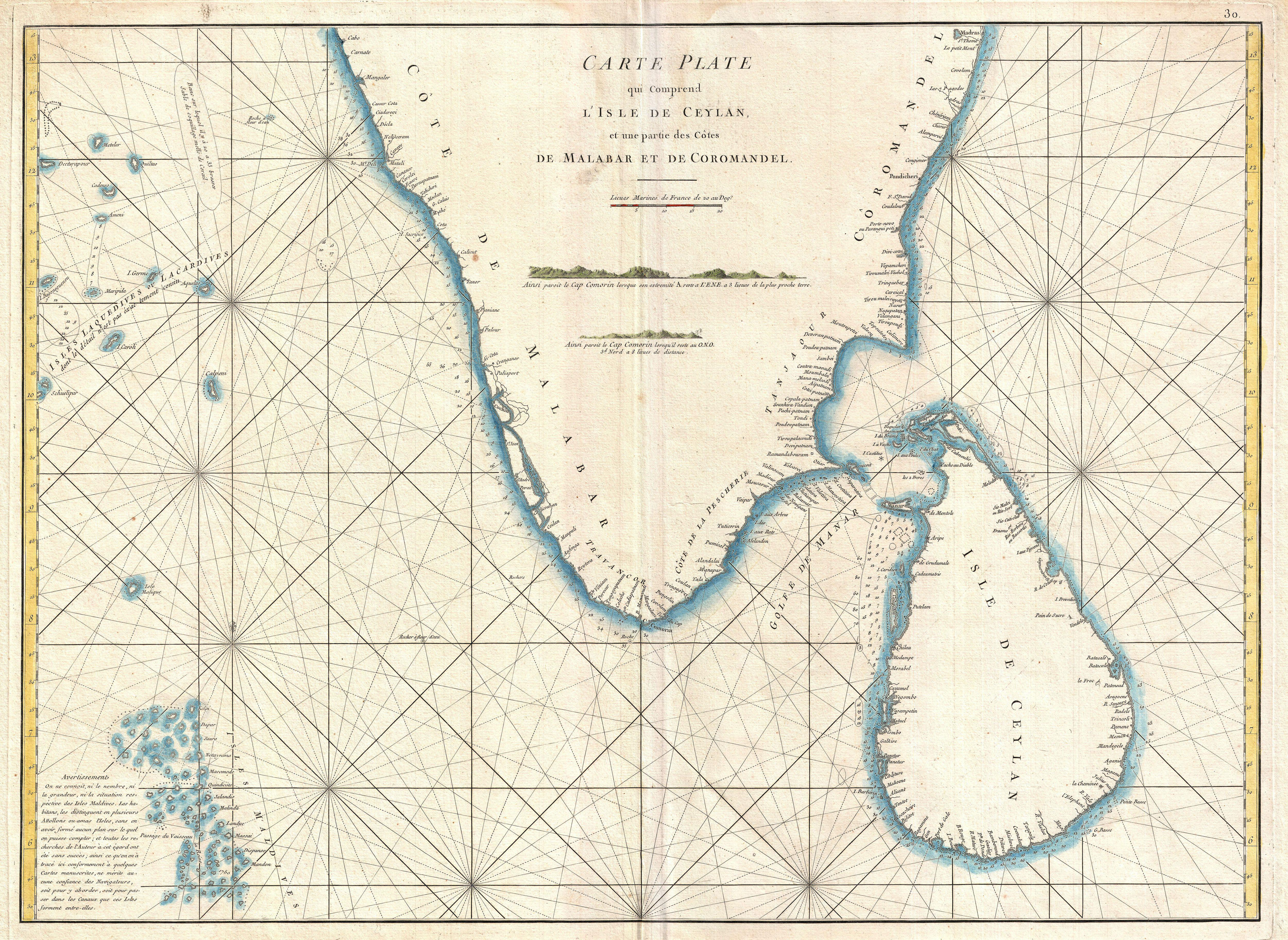
1775 maritime map or nautical chart of southern India and Ceylon by Jean-Baptiste d'Après de Mannevillette.

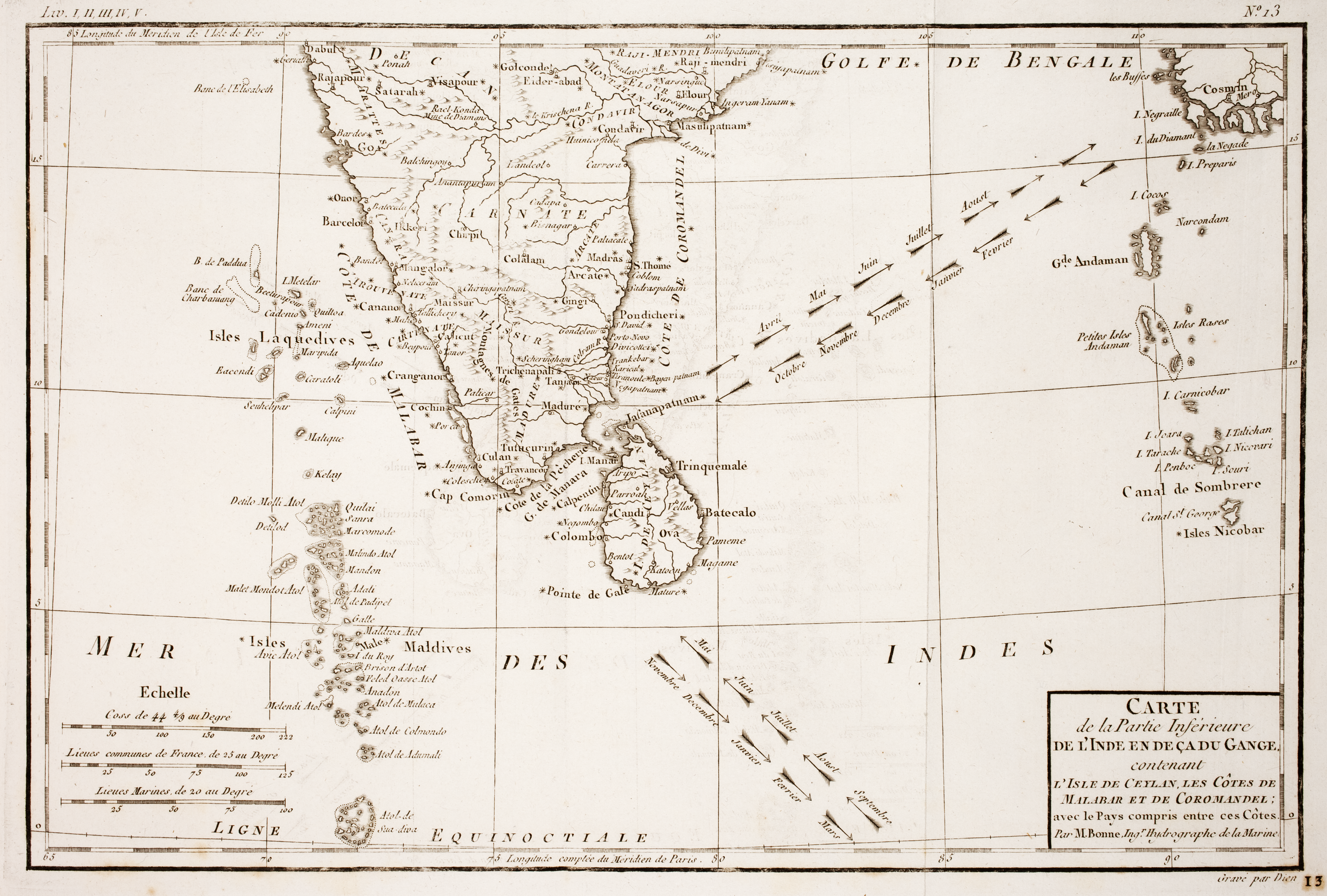
Historical map of South India, Sri Lanka, the Maldives, the Nicobar Islands, Myanmar, the Malabar Coast, the Coromandel Coast, the Andaman Islands (1780)

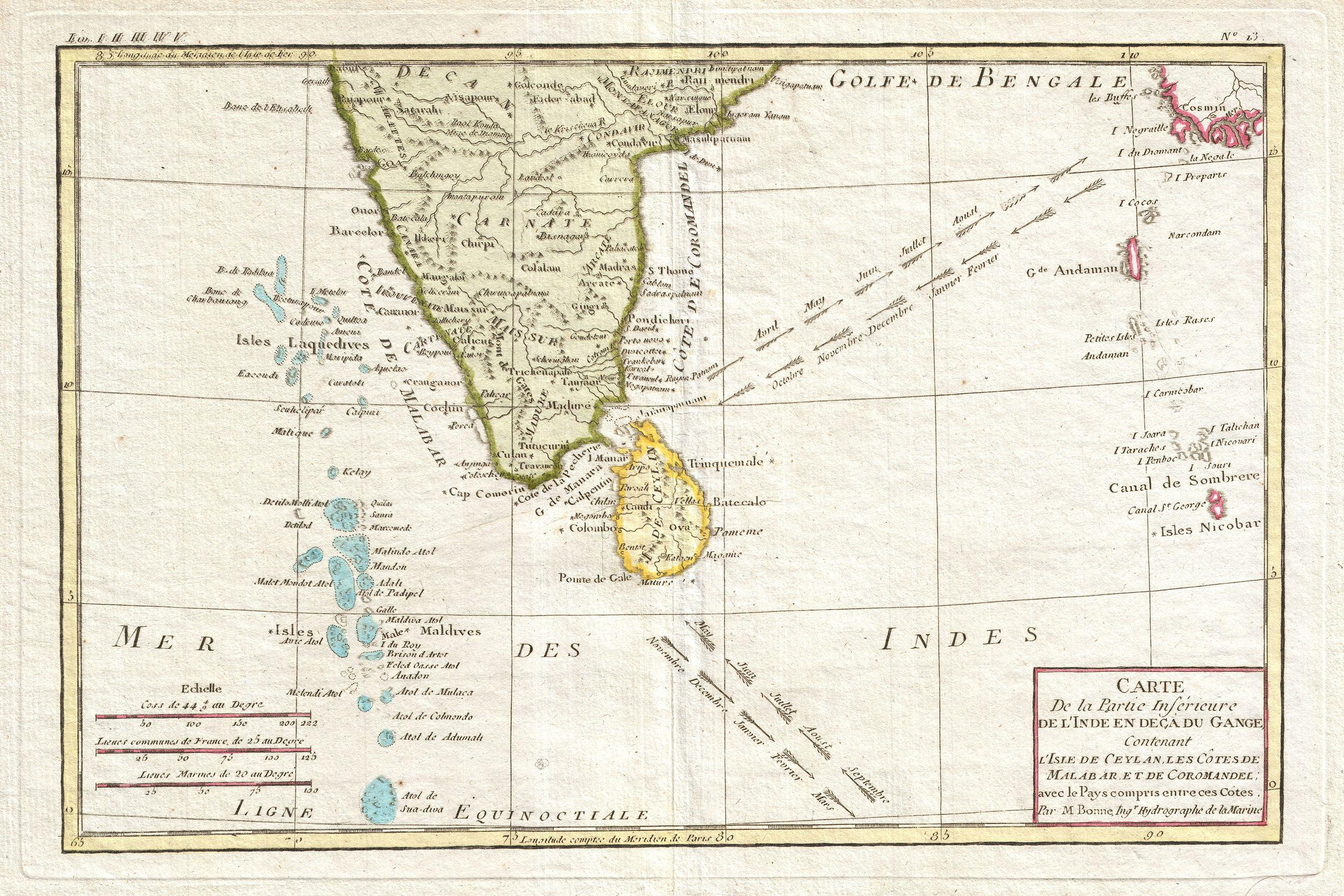
1780 map of southern India by the French cartographer Rigobert Bonne.

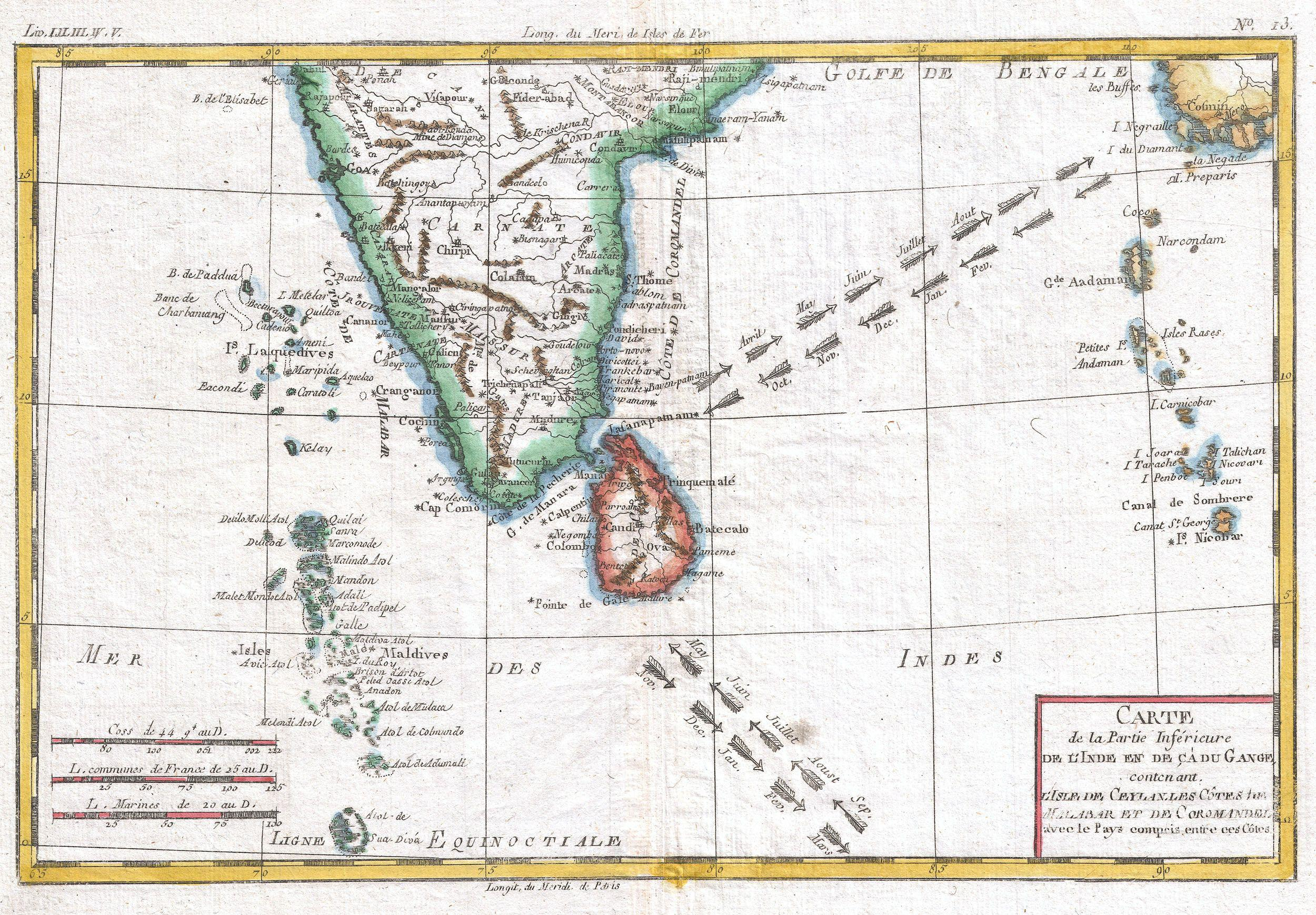
Rigobert Bonne and G. Raynal's 1780 map of Southern India.

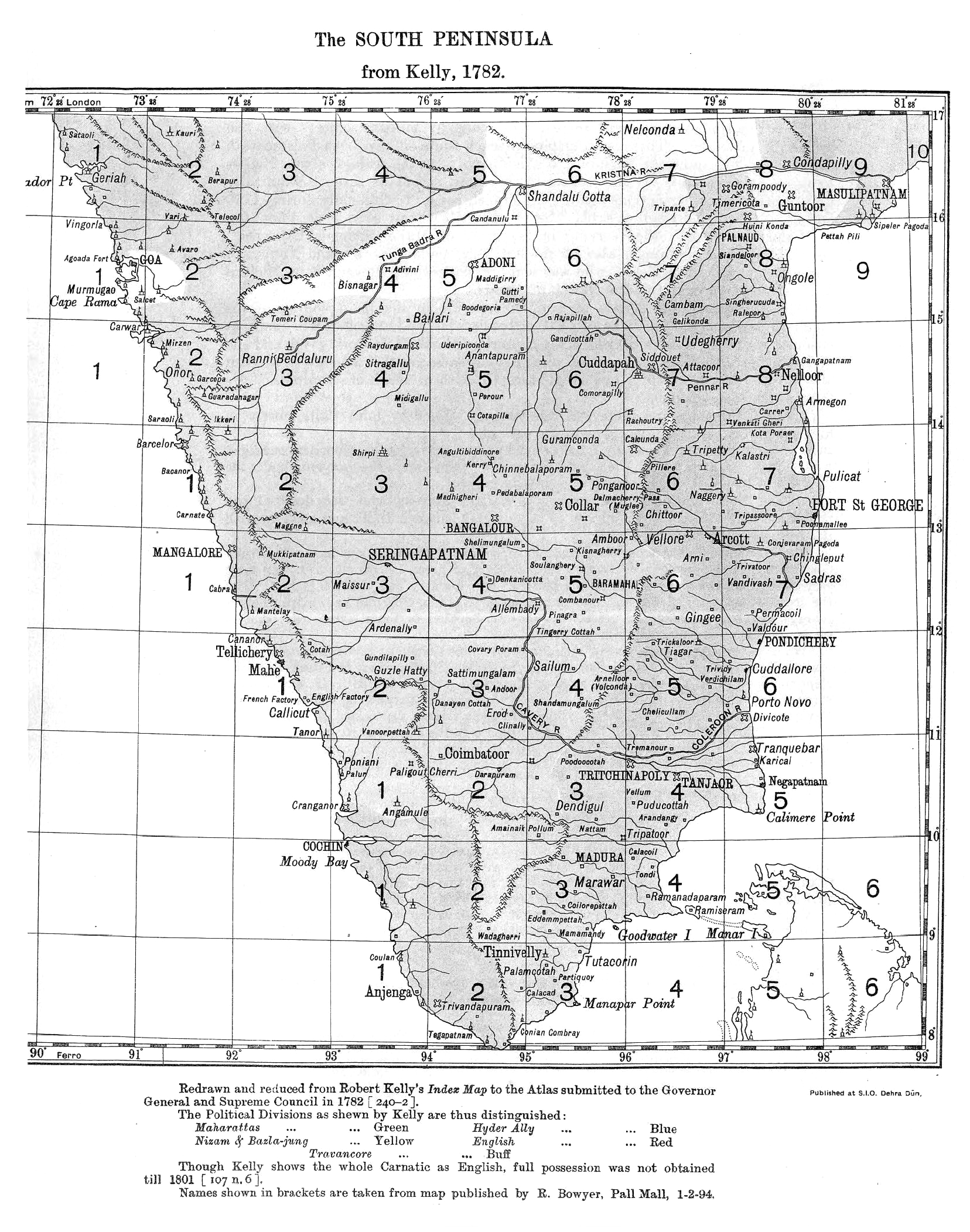
South India in 1782

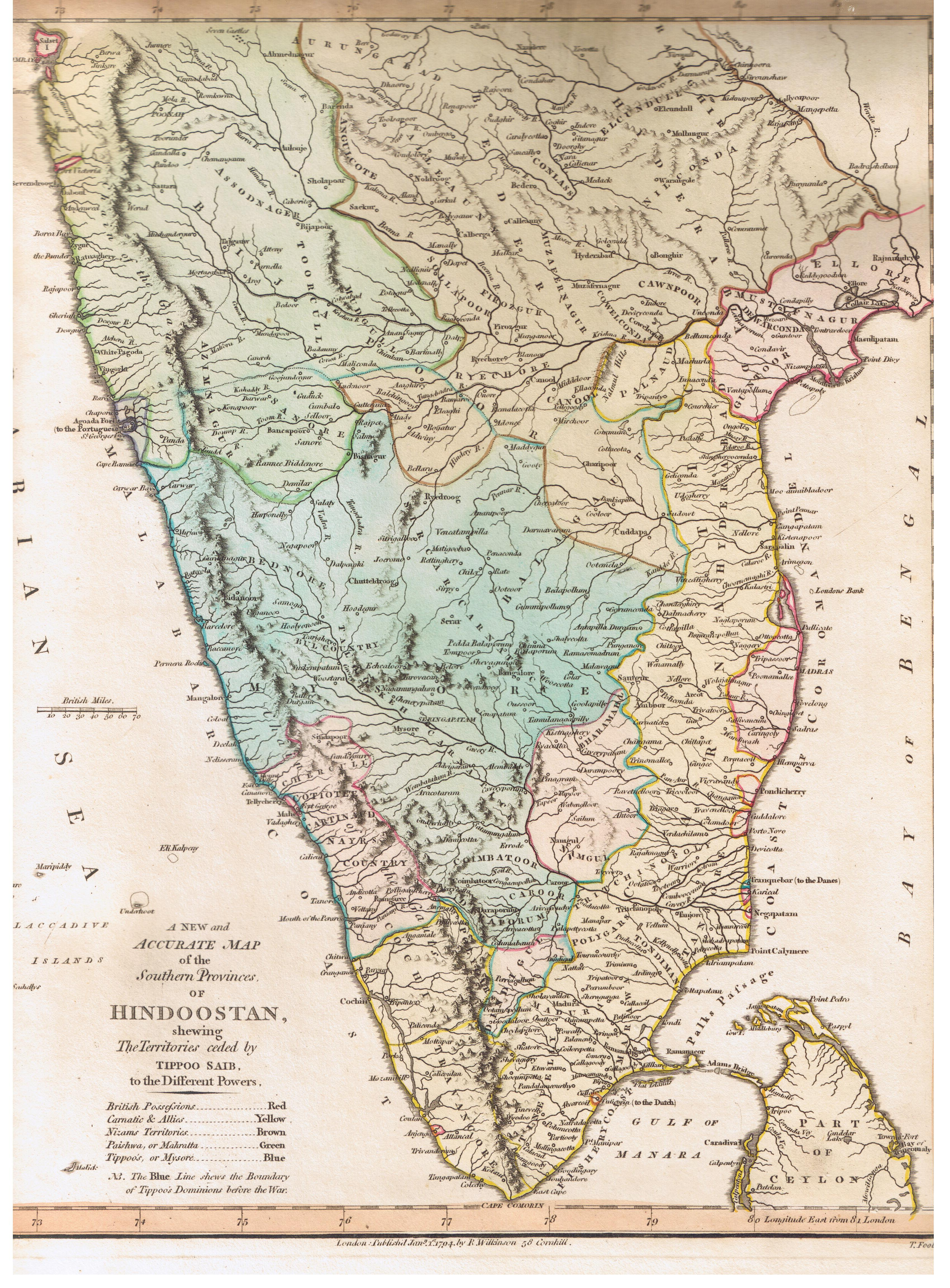
Political state of South India just after Third Anglo-Mysore War which ended in 1792.

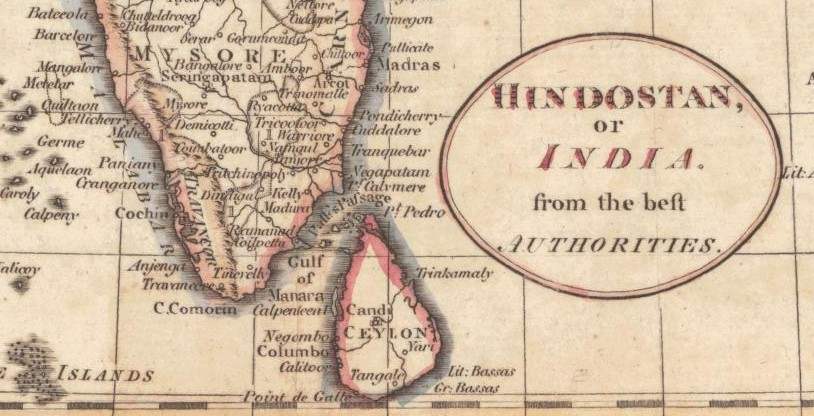
South India in 1794

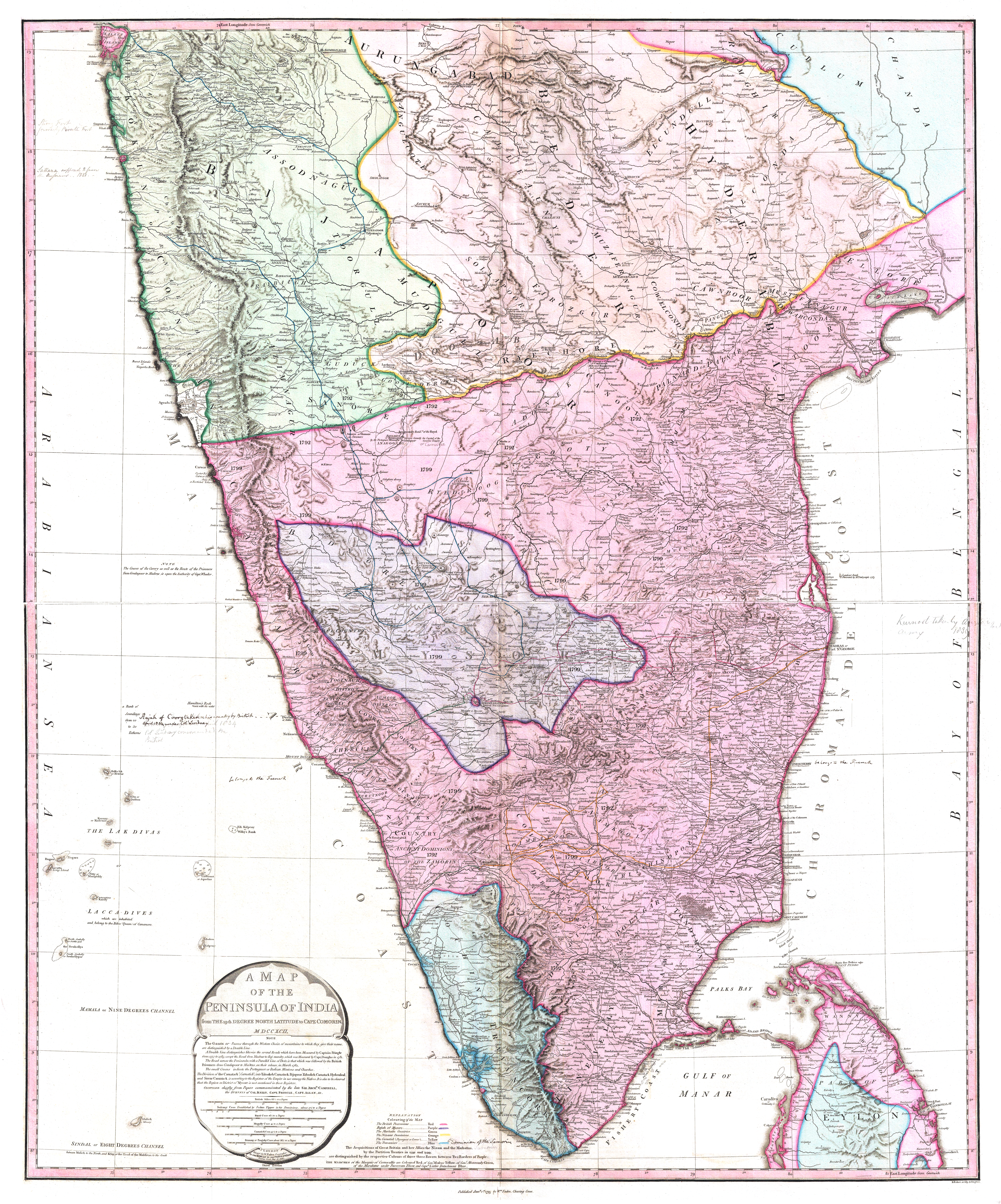
A Map of the Peninsula of India from the 19th Degree North Latitude to Cape Comorin, just after the Fourth Anglo-Mysore War which ended in 1799

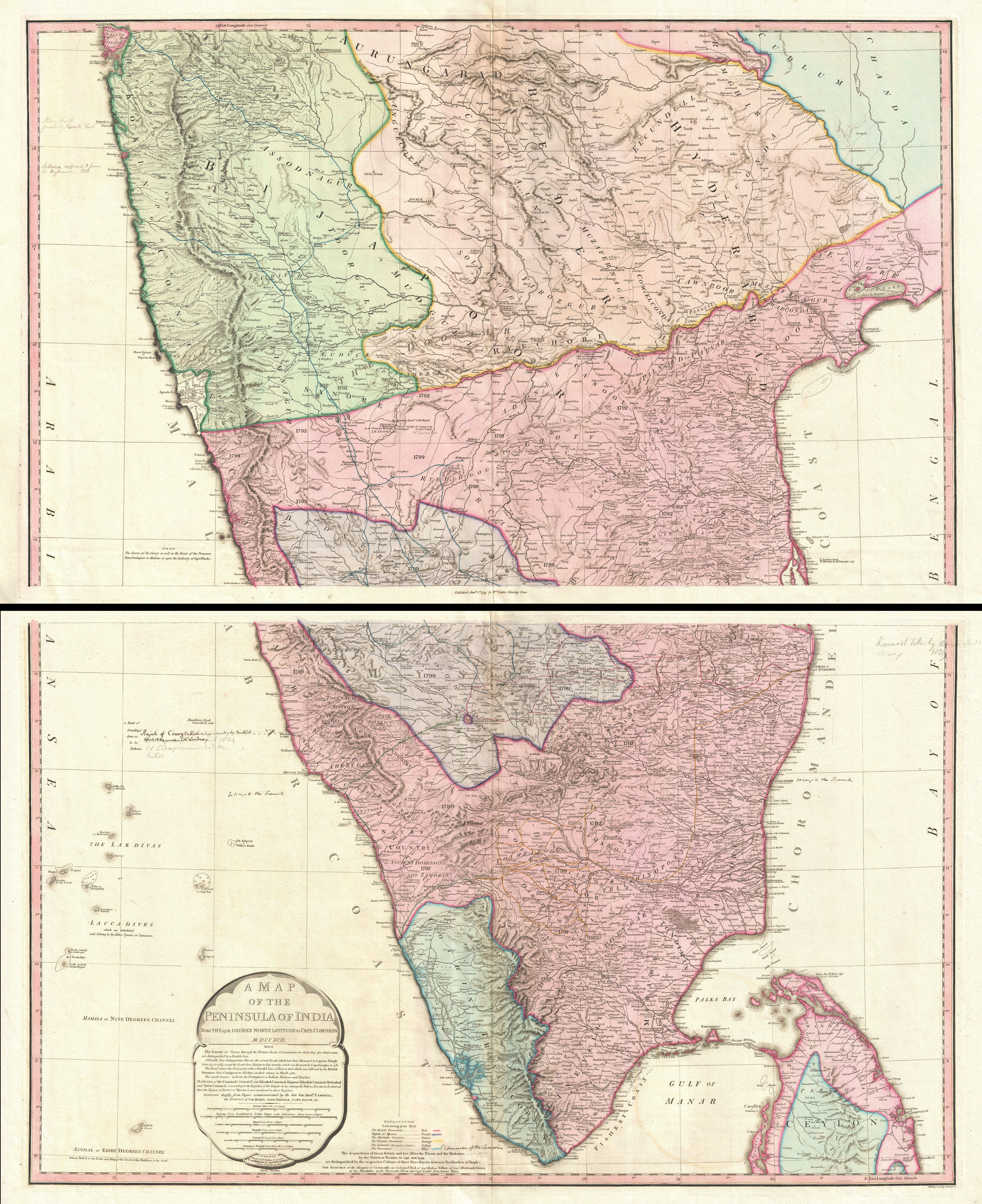
1800 Faden Rennell Wall Map of India - Geographicus - India

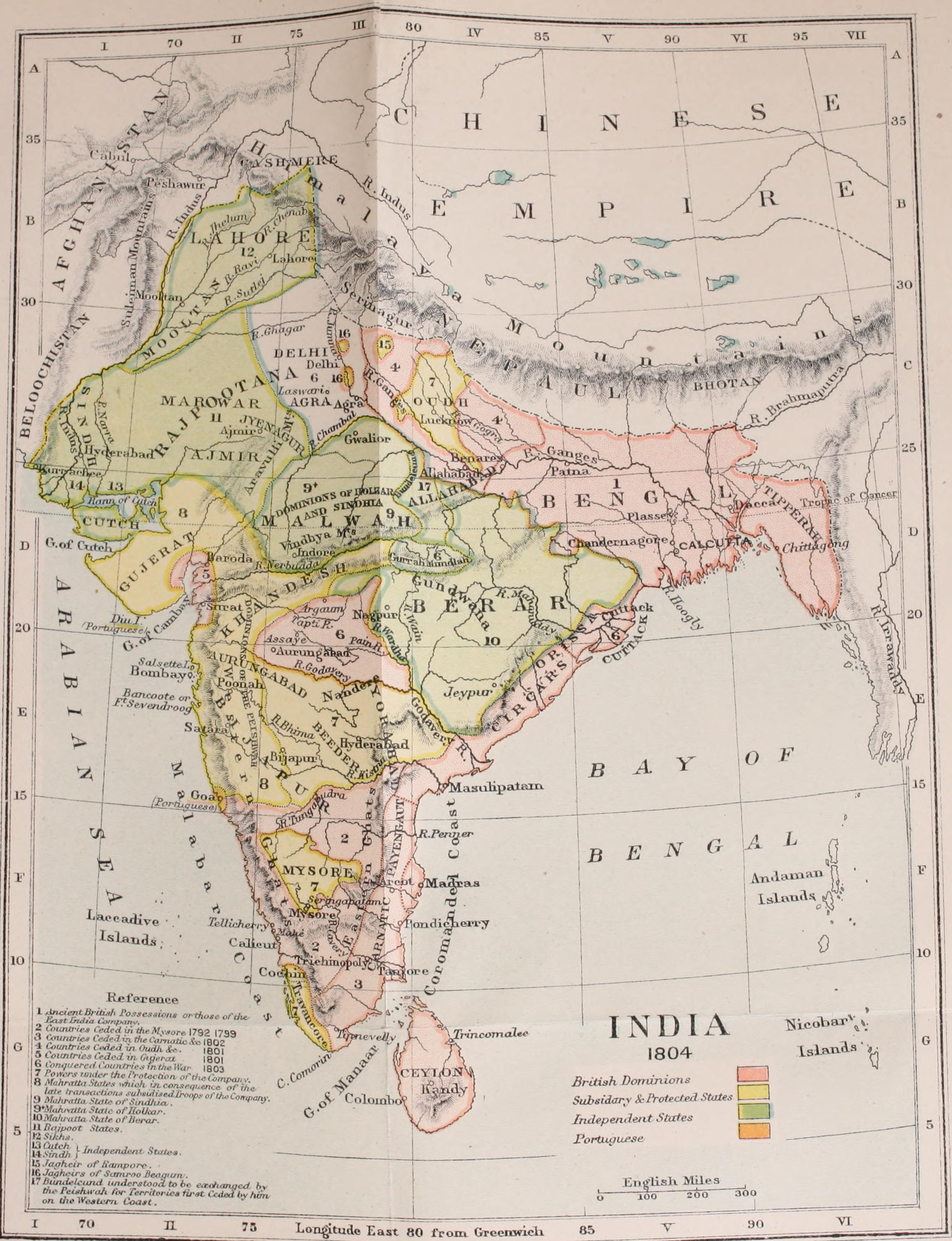
India in 1804

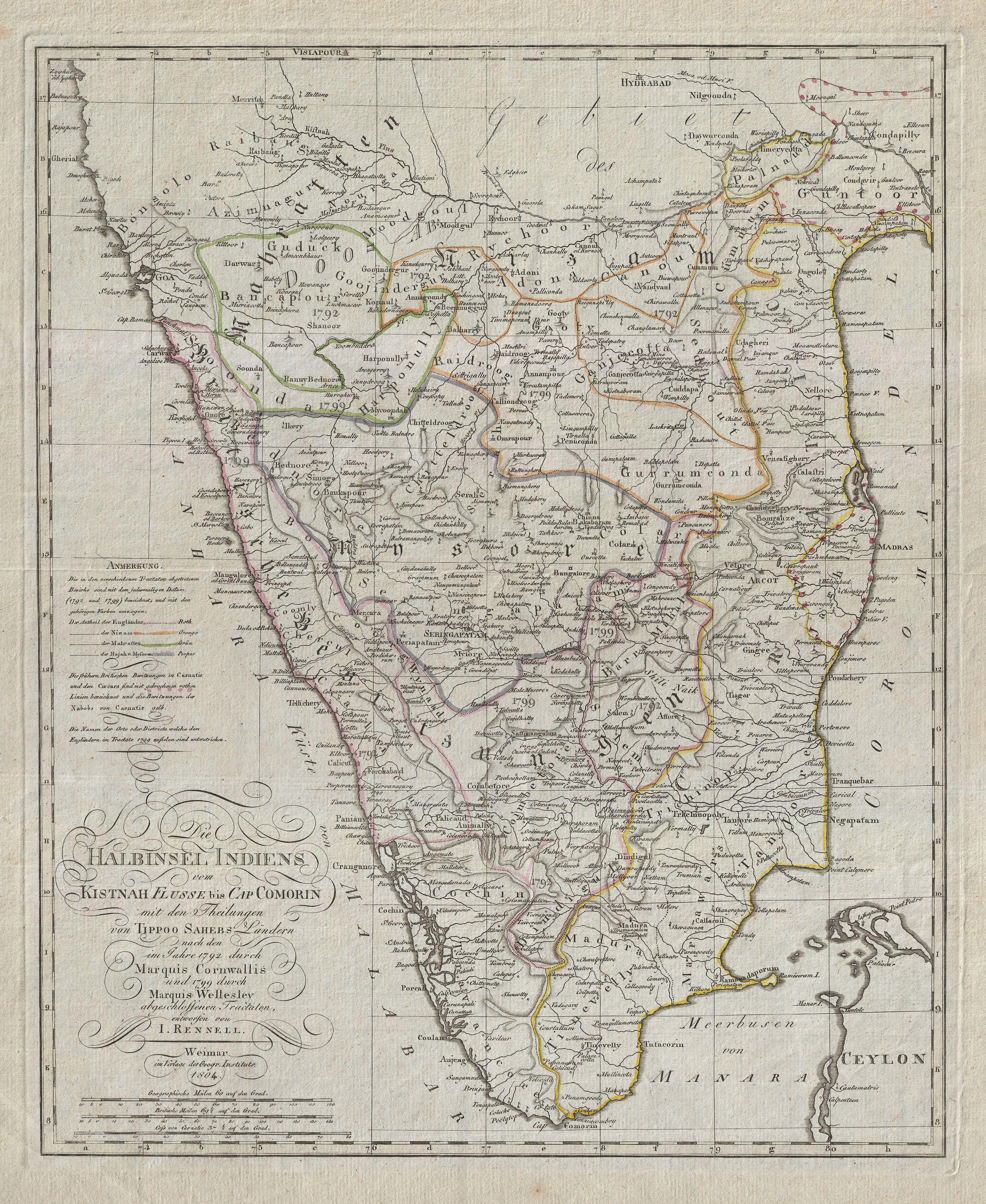
1804 German Edition of the Rennel Map of India - Geographicus

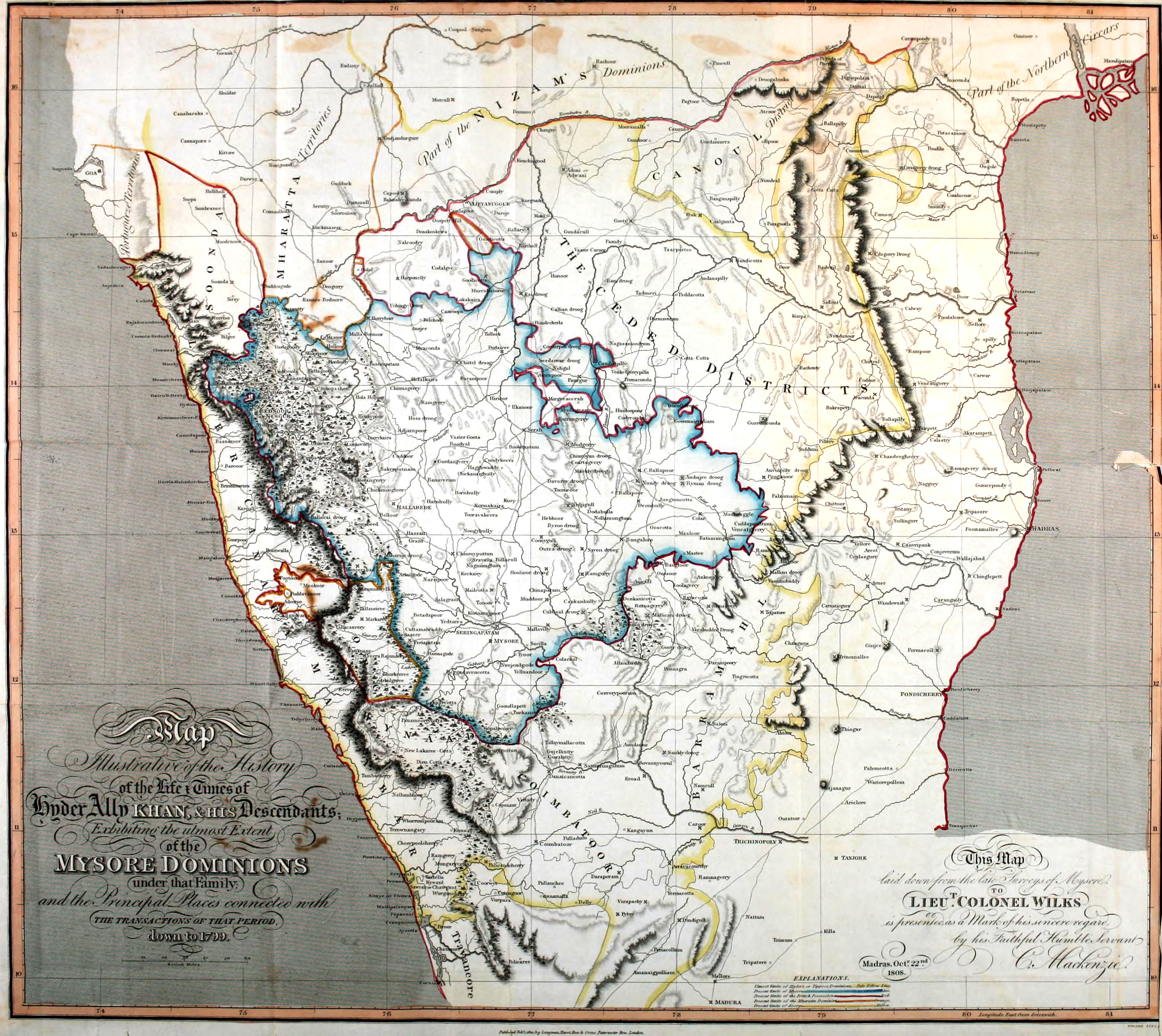
South India in 1808

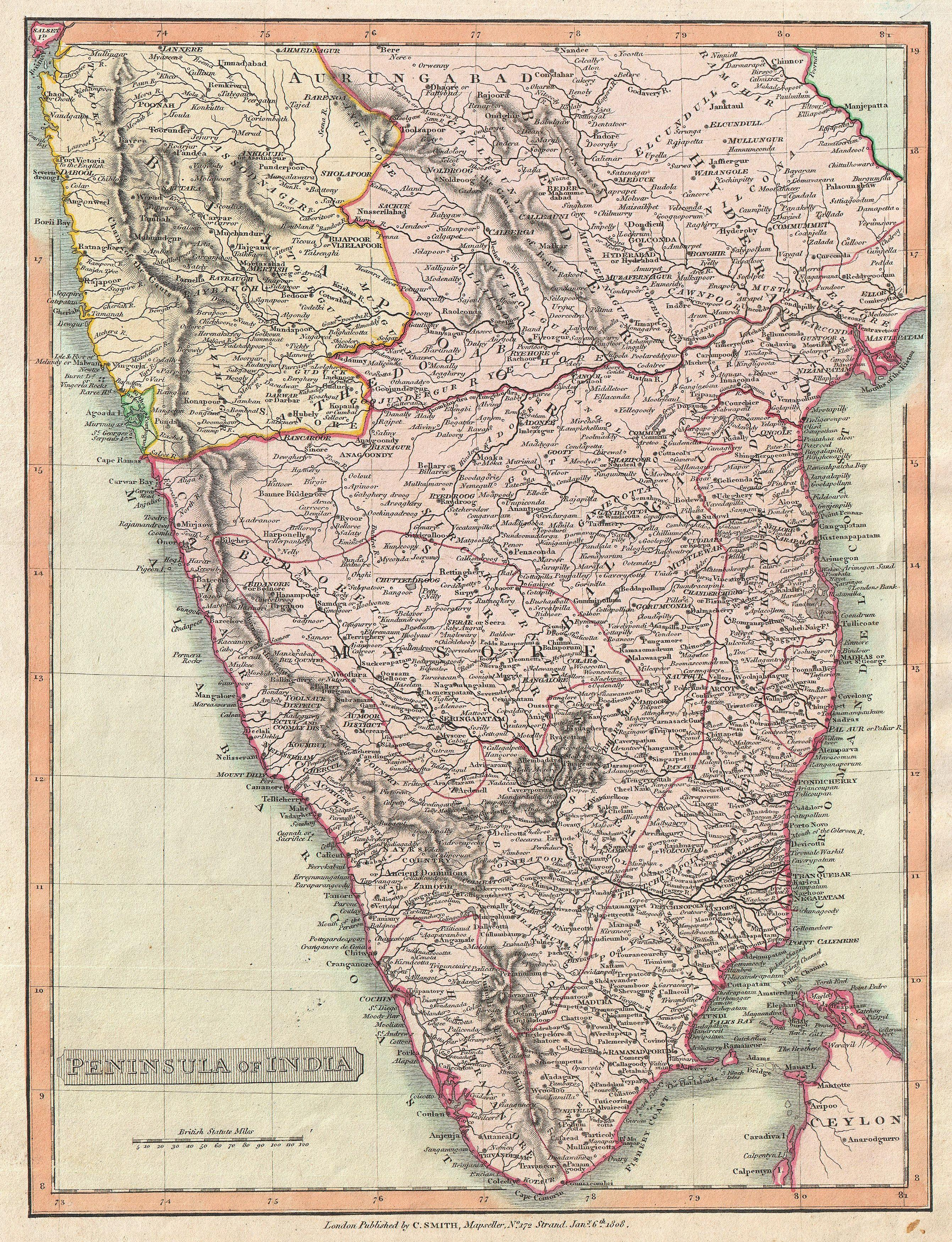
1808 Smith Map of India - Geographicus - India

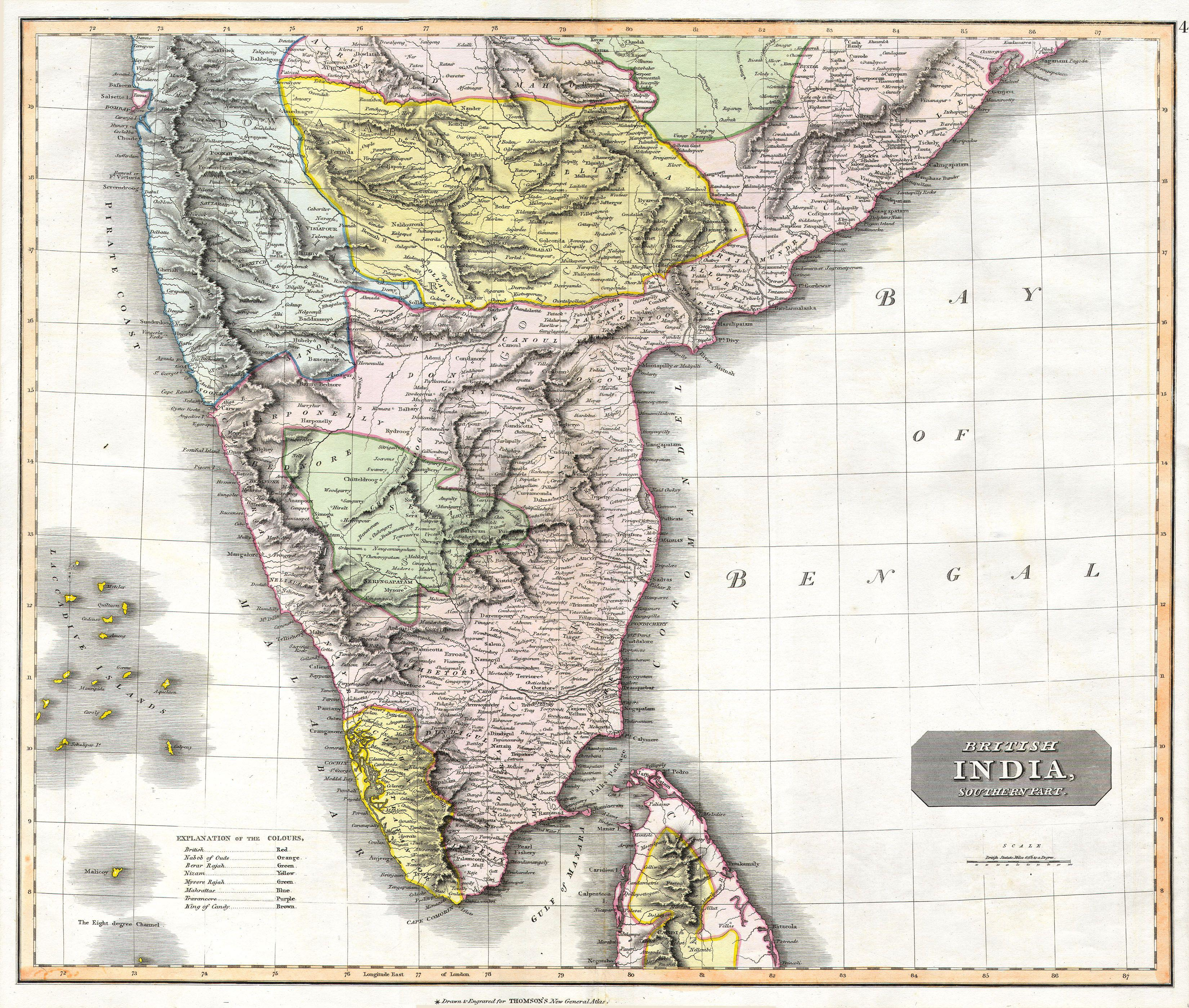
1814 Thomson Map of India - Geographicus - India

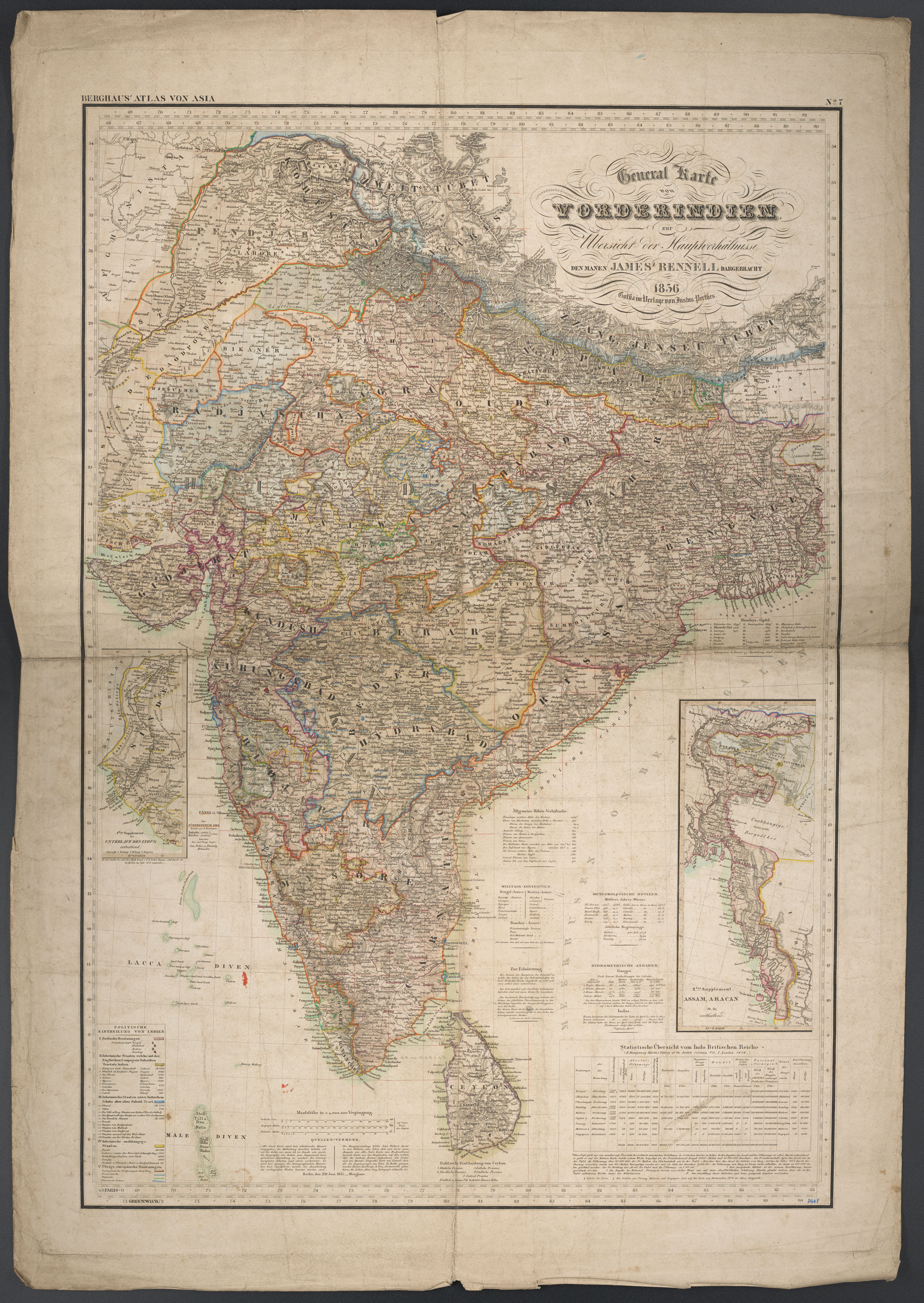
India in General Karte von Vorderindien zur Übersicht der Hauptverhältnisse (1836)

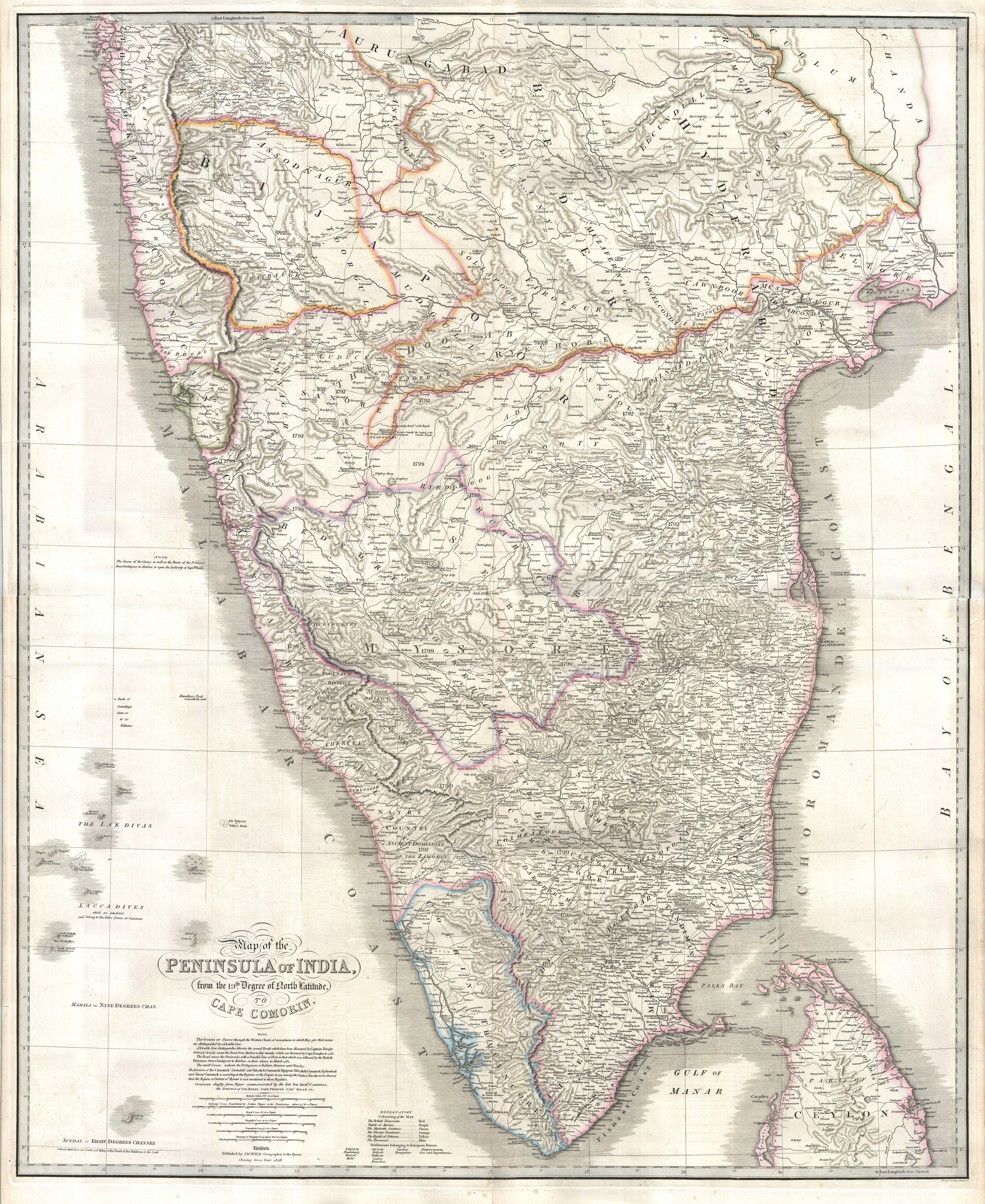
1838 Wyld Wall Map of India (Hindostan or British India) - Geographicus - India

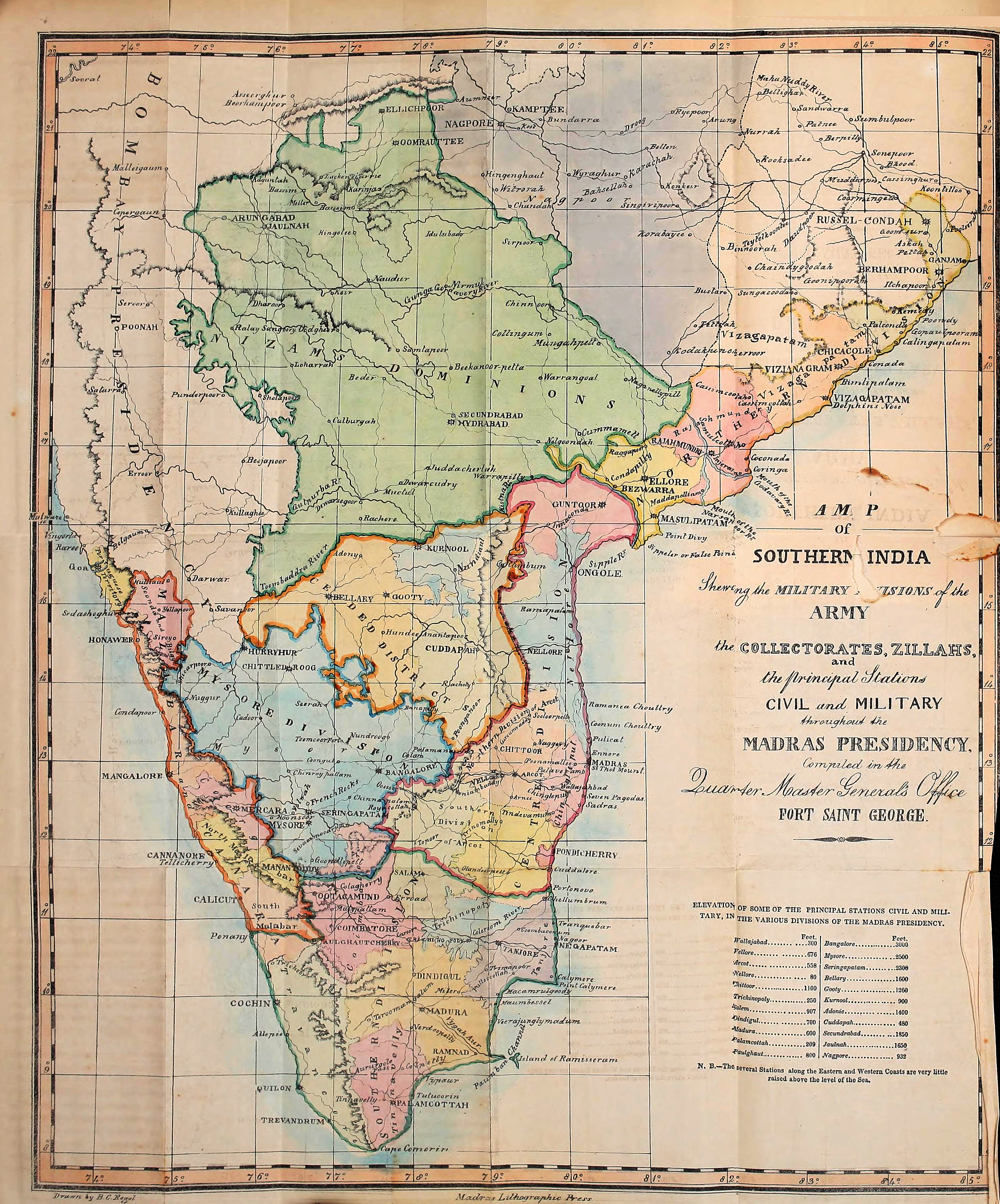
South India in 1843

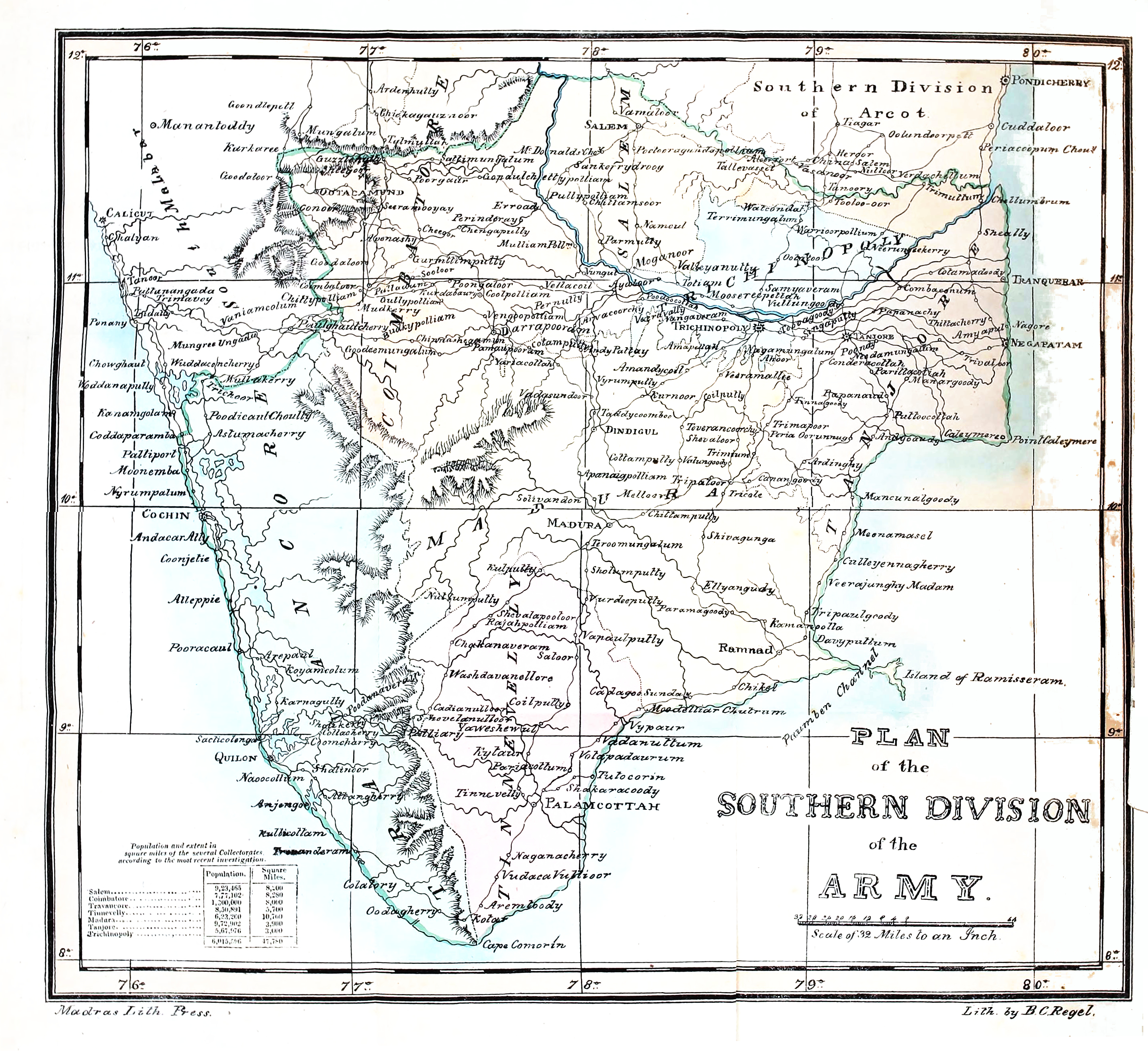
Southern division of South India in 1843

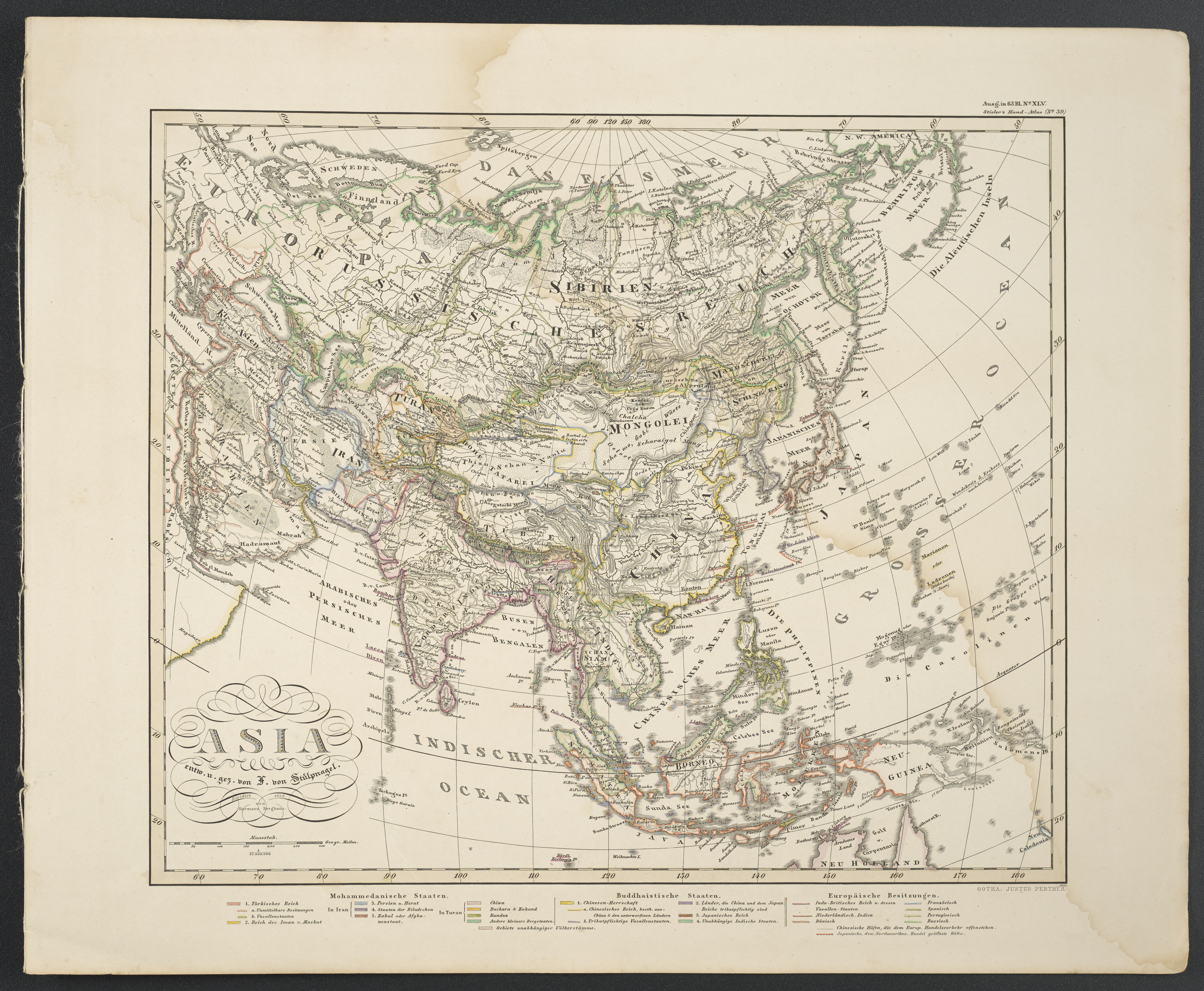
Asia in 1840 - 1860 (Calicut is marked)

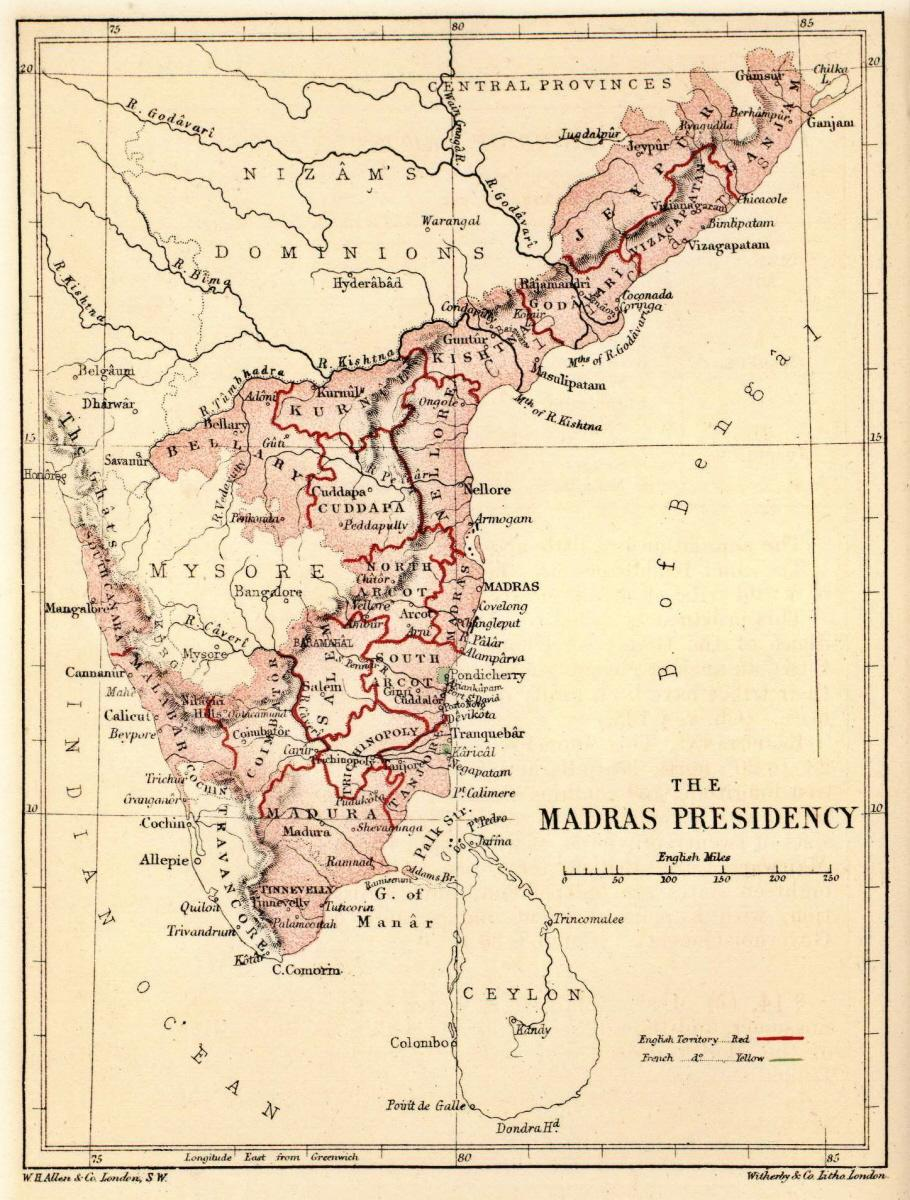
Map of Madras Presidency in taken from Text-book of Indian History: Geographical Notes, Genealogical Tables, Examination Questions (1880)

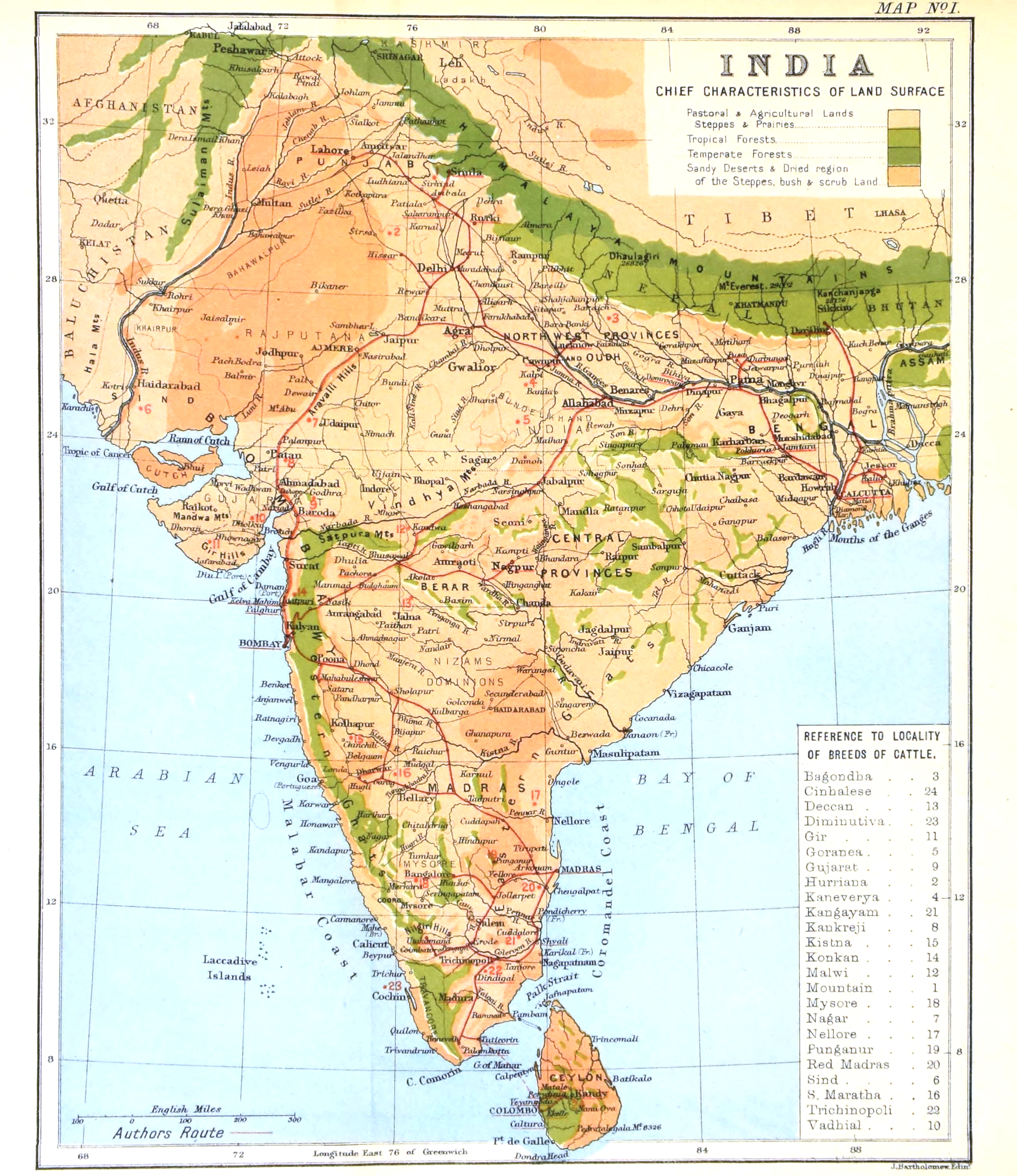
India in 1887 with cattle breeds based on the travels of Robert Wallace.

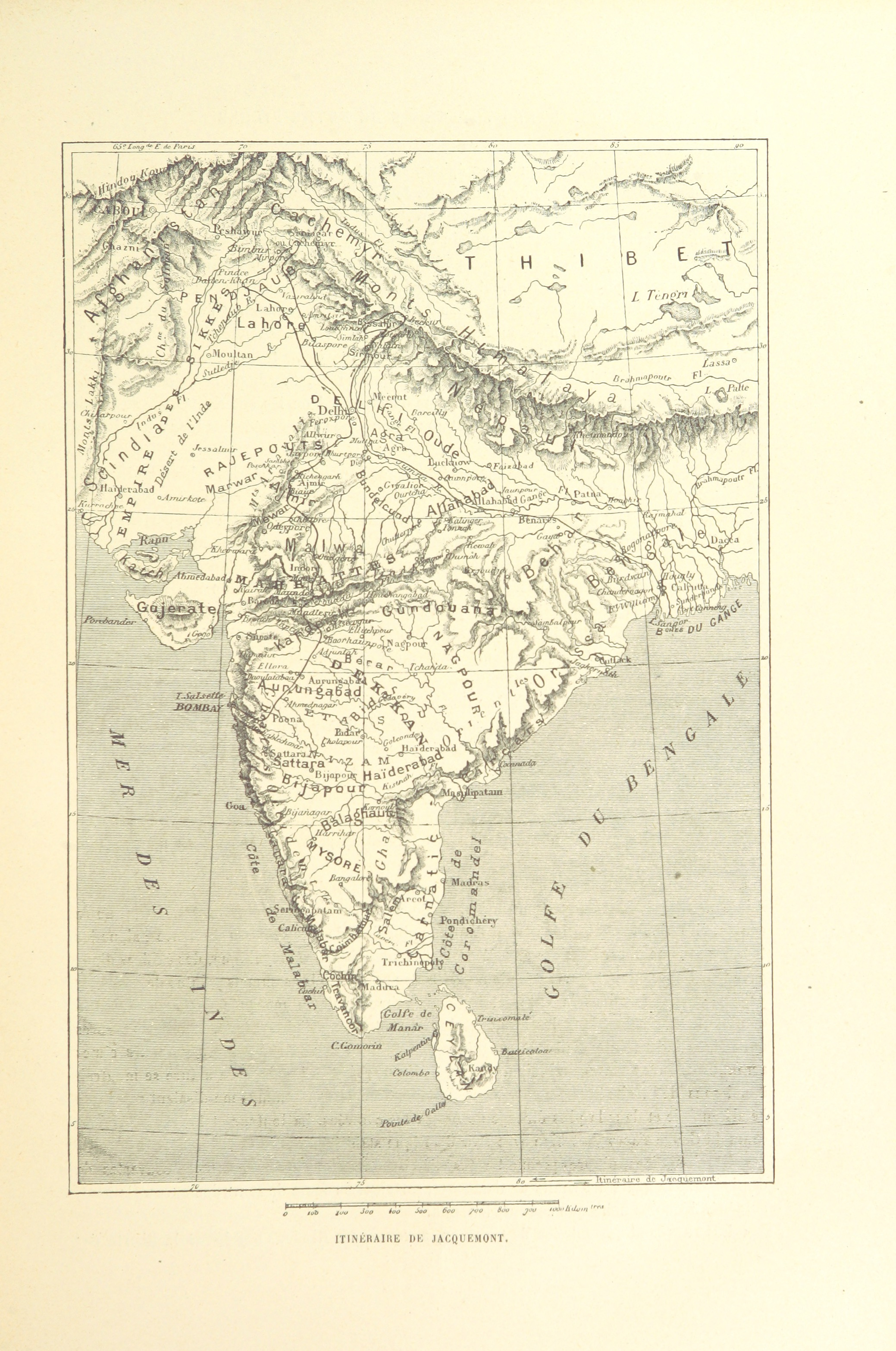
1889 map of India (Only Calicut and Cochin are highlighted from Kerala).

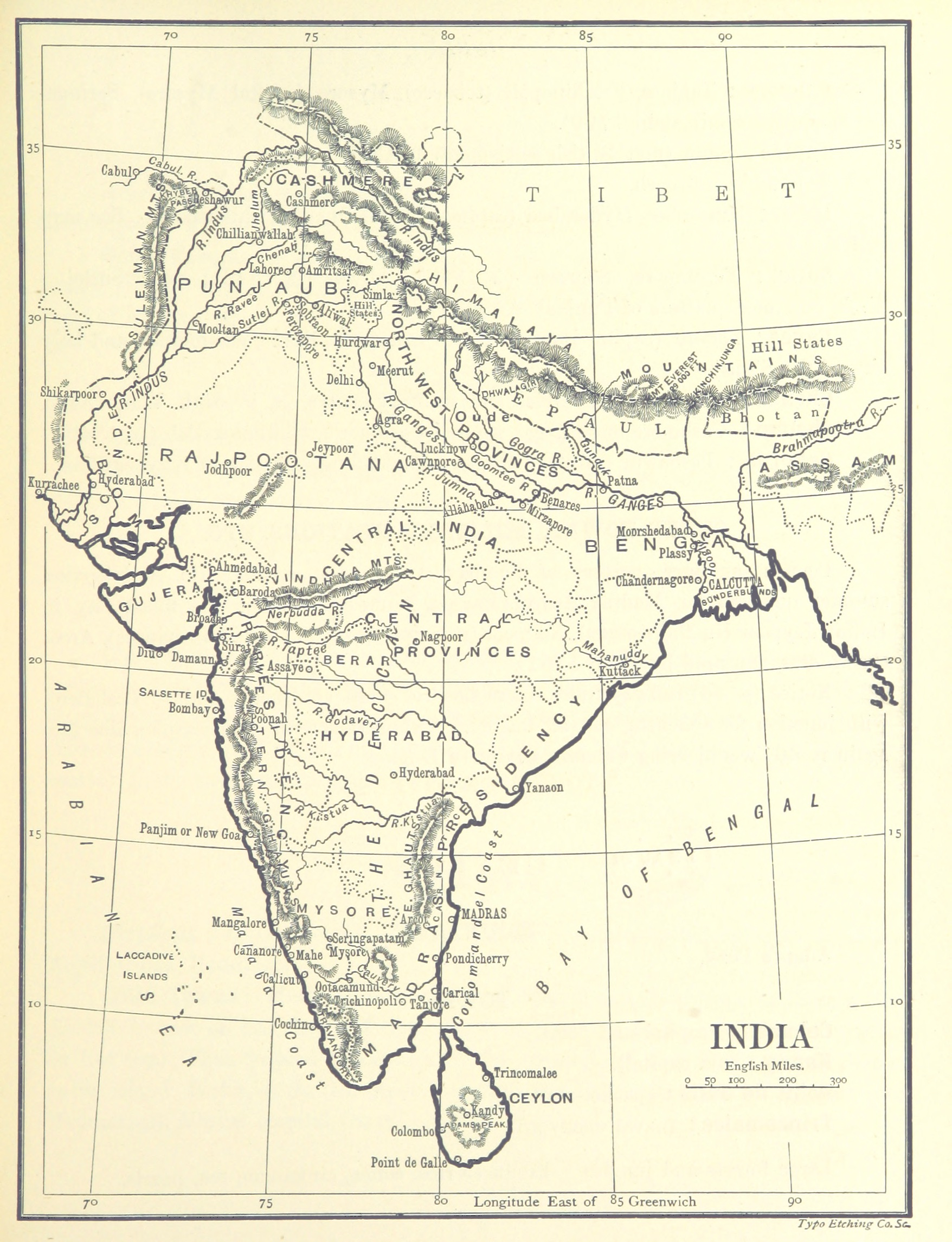
1891 Map of India (Outlines of Geography for the use of lower and middle forms of schools and of candidates for the Army Preliminary Examinations)

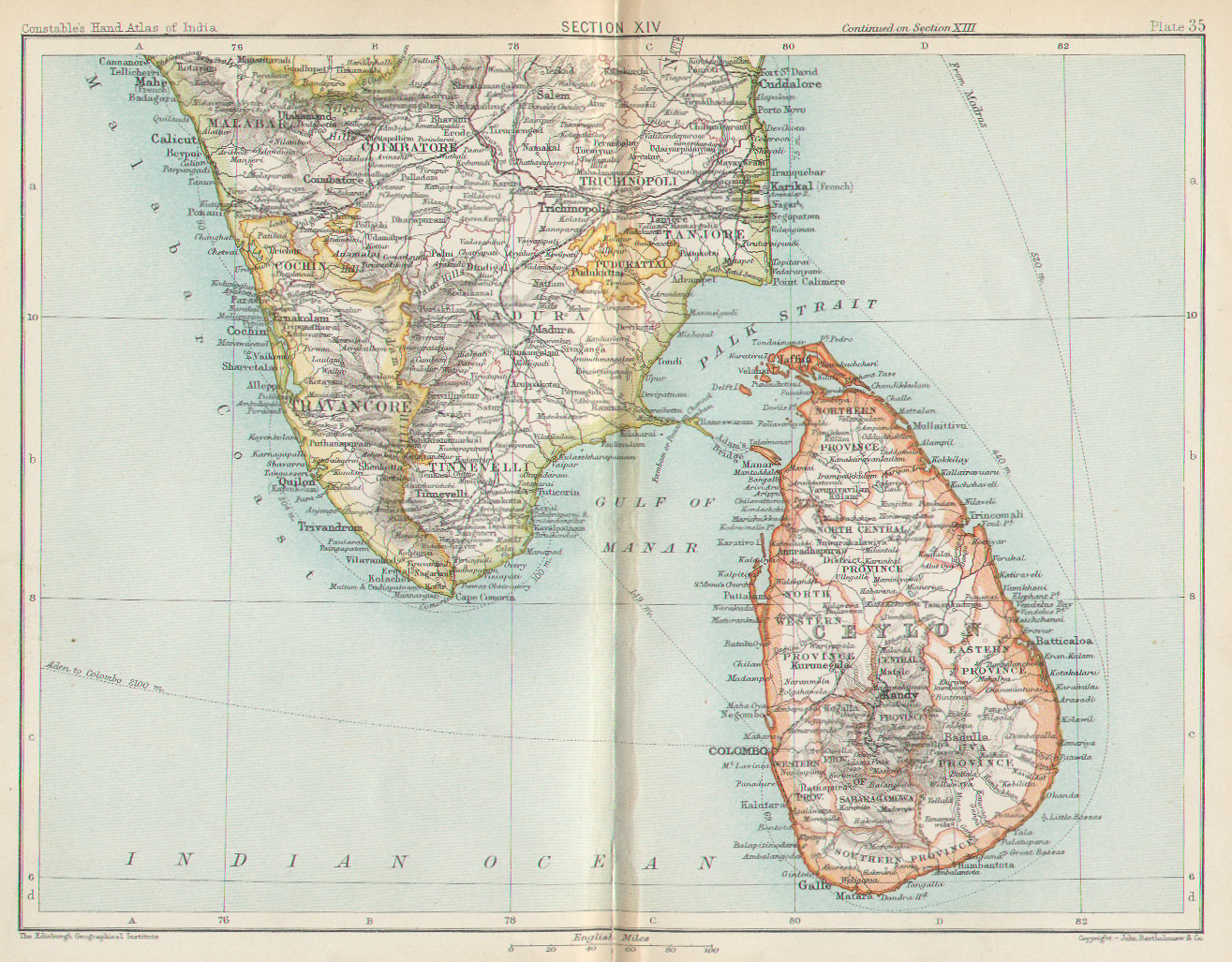
Malabar Coast in 1893

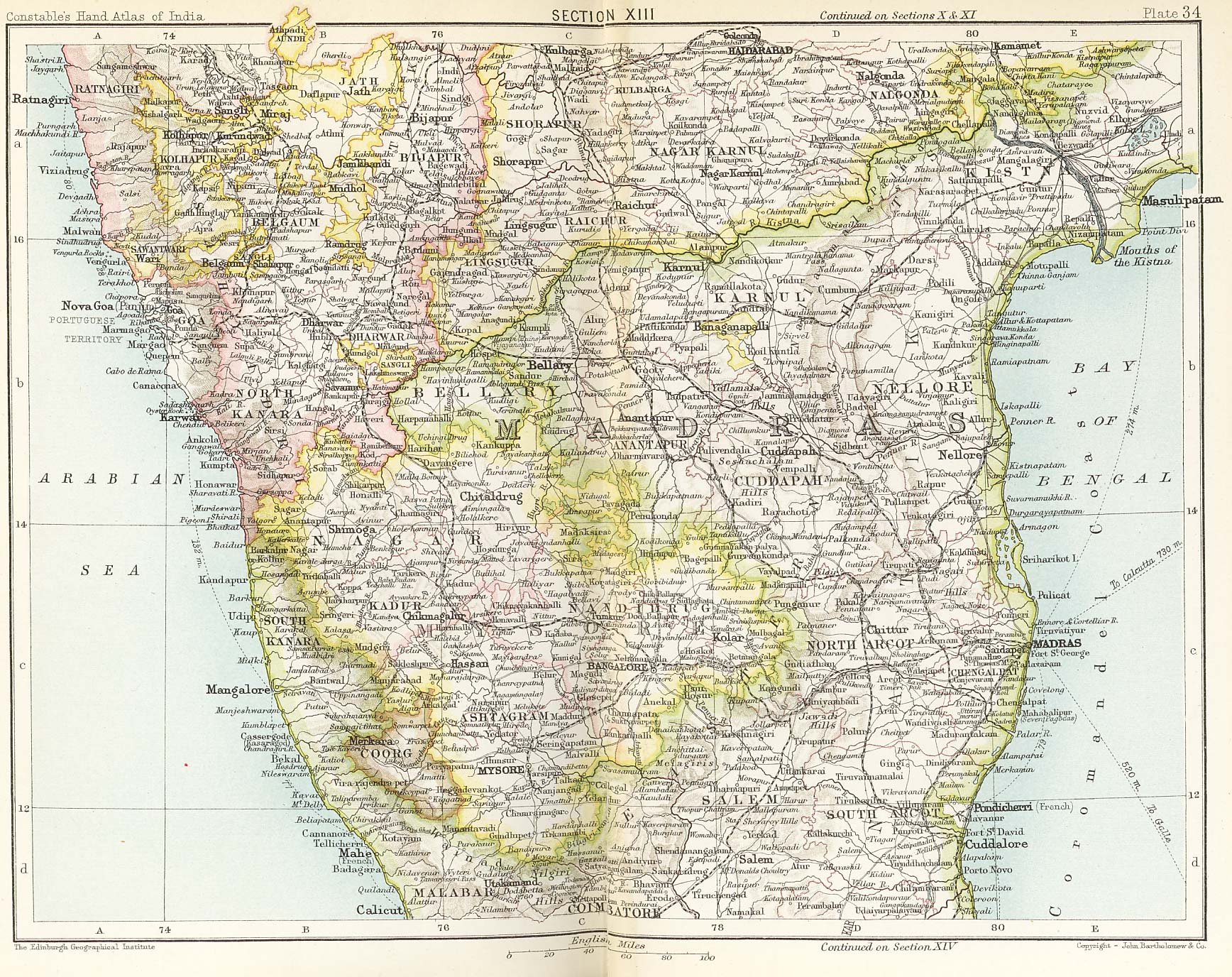
North Malabar in 1893 (On the southwestern end of the map)

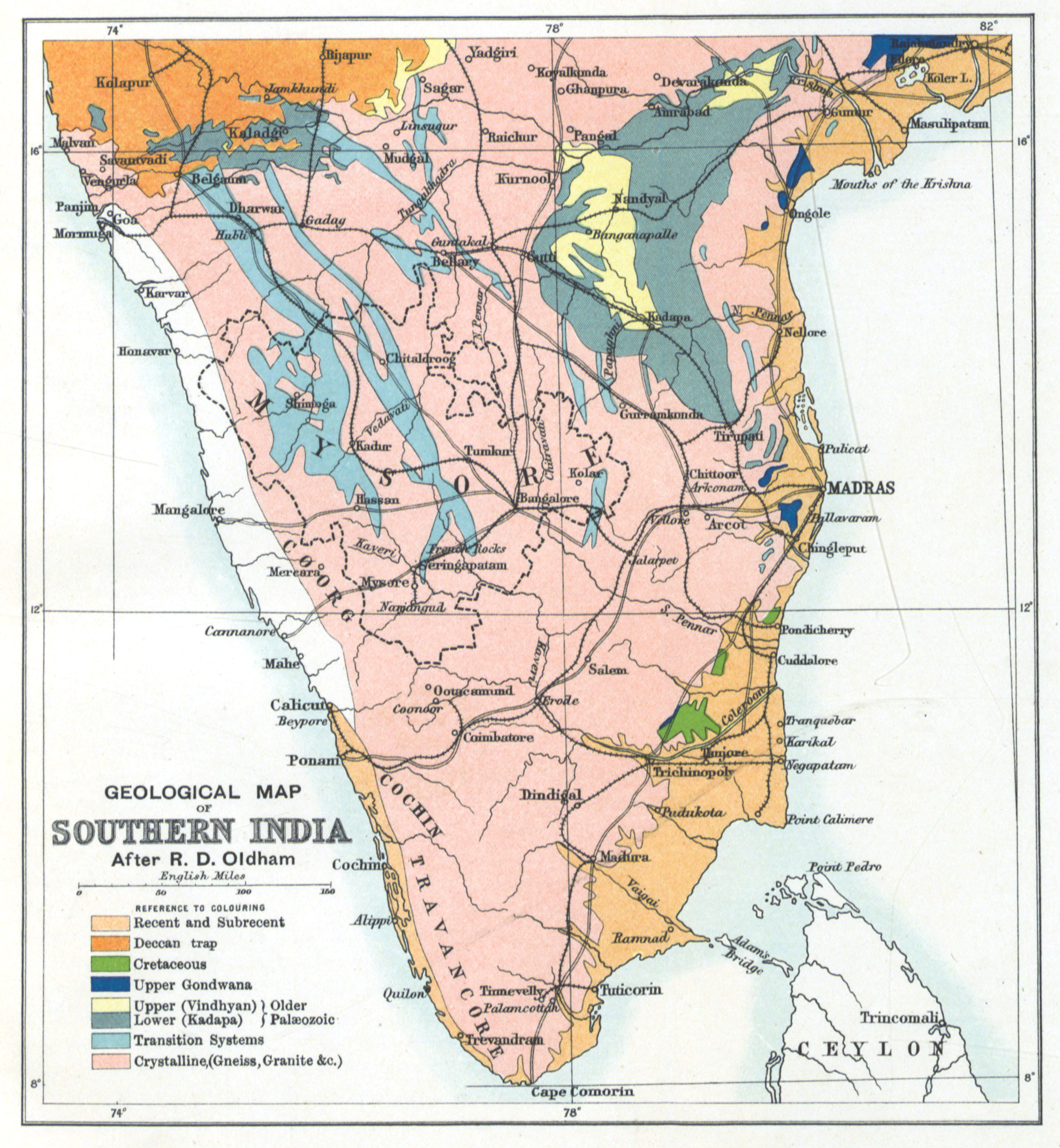
Geology Gazetter map of Malabar in 1897

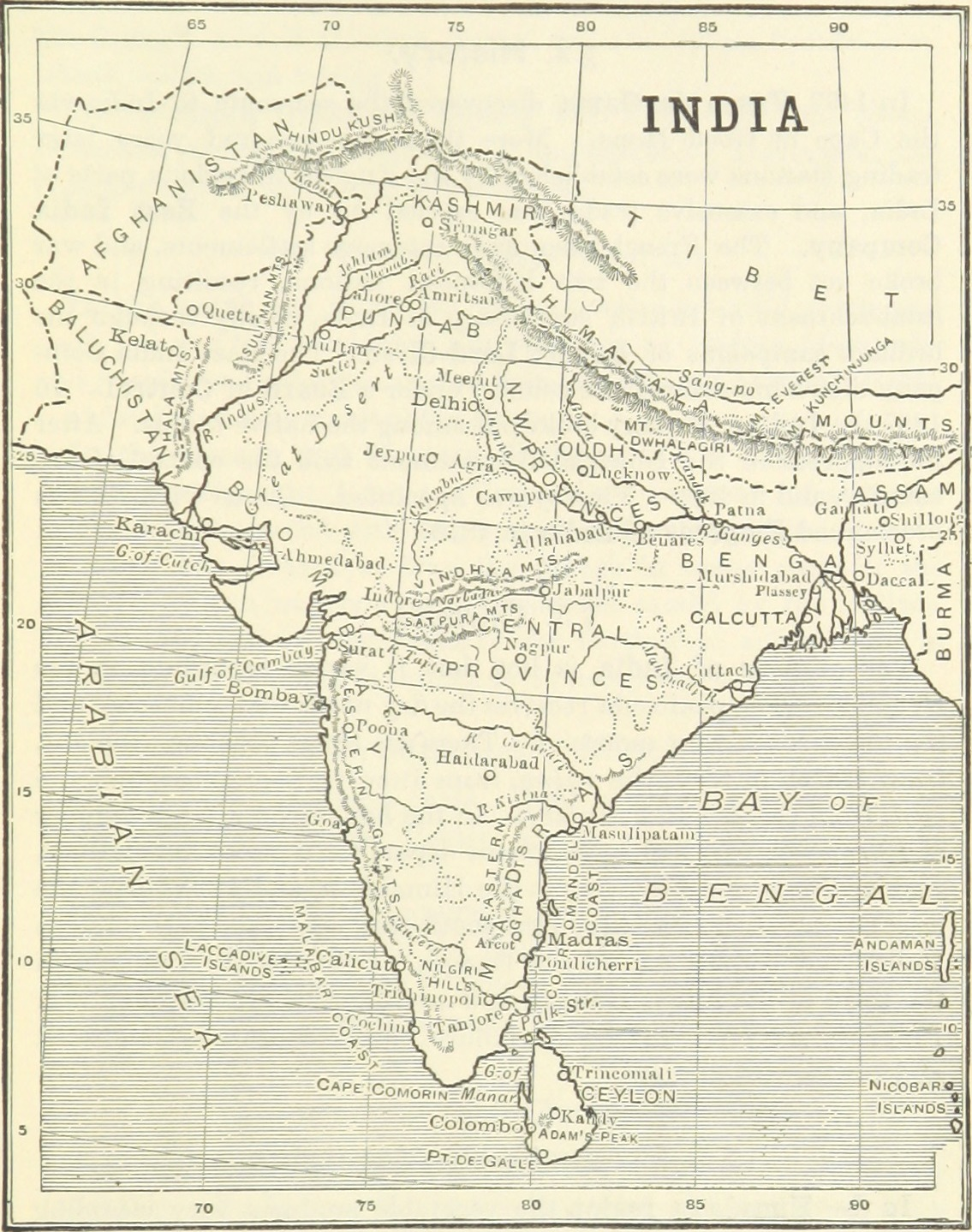
1899 Map of India (Only Calicut and Cochin are highlighted from Kerala).

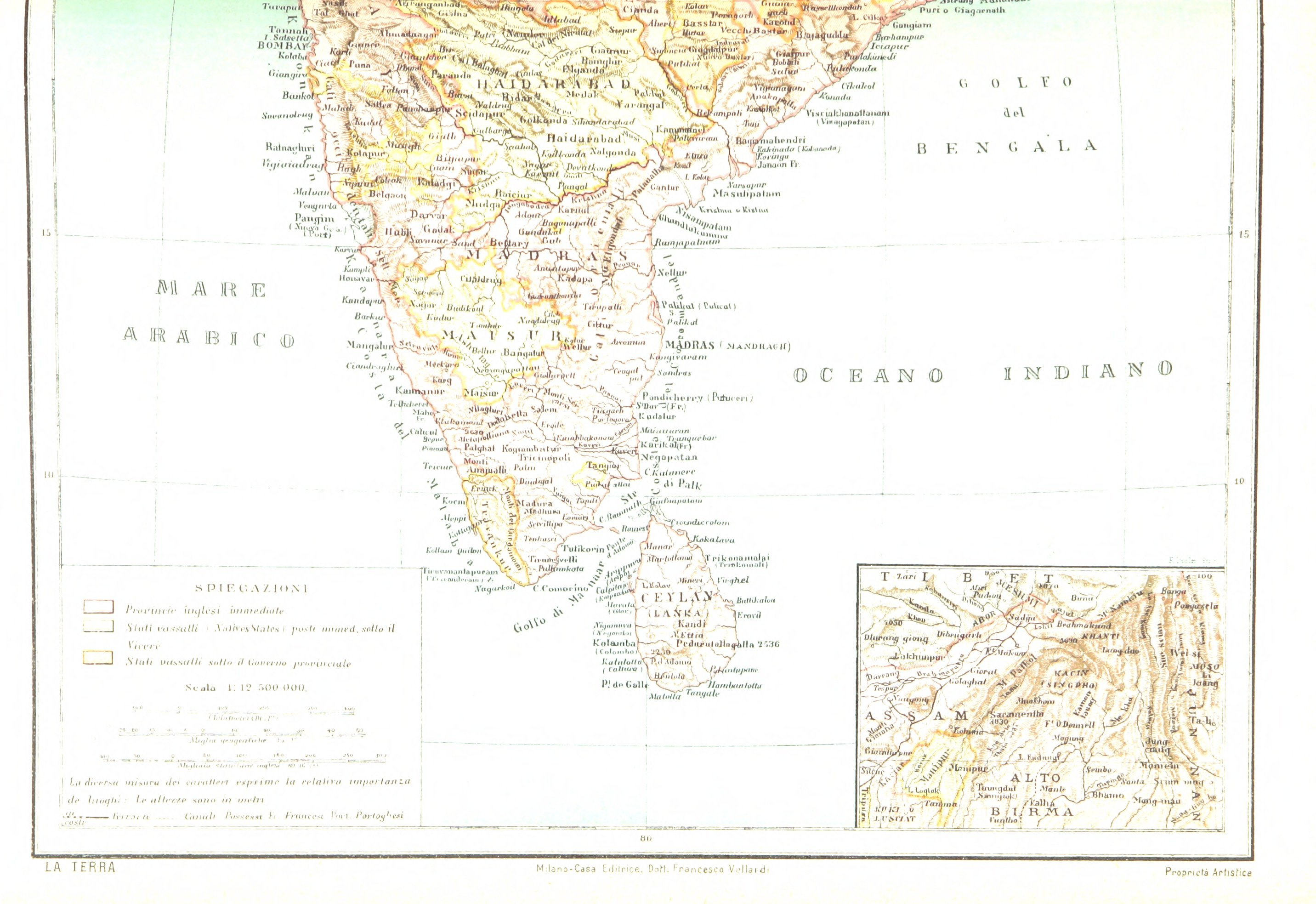
Image taken from page 1381 of La Terra, trattato popolare di geografia universale

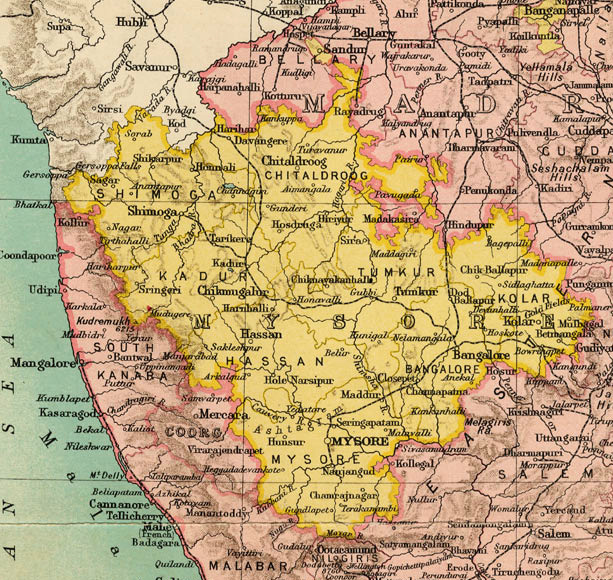
North Malabar in 1909 (On the southwestern end of the map)

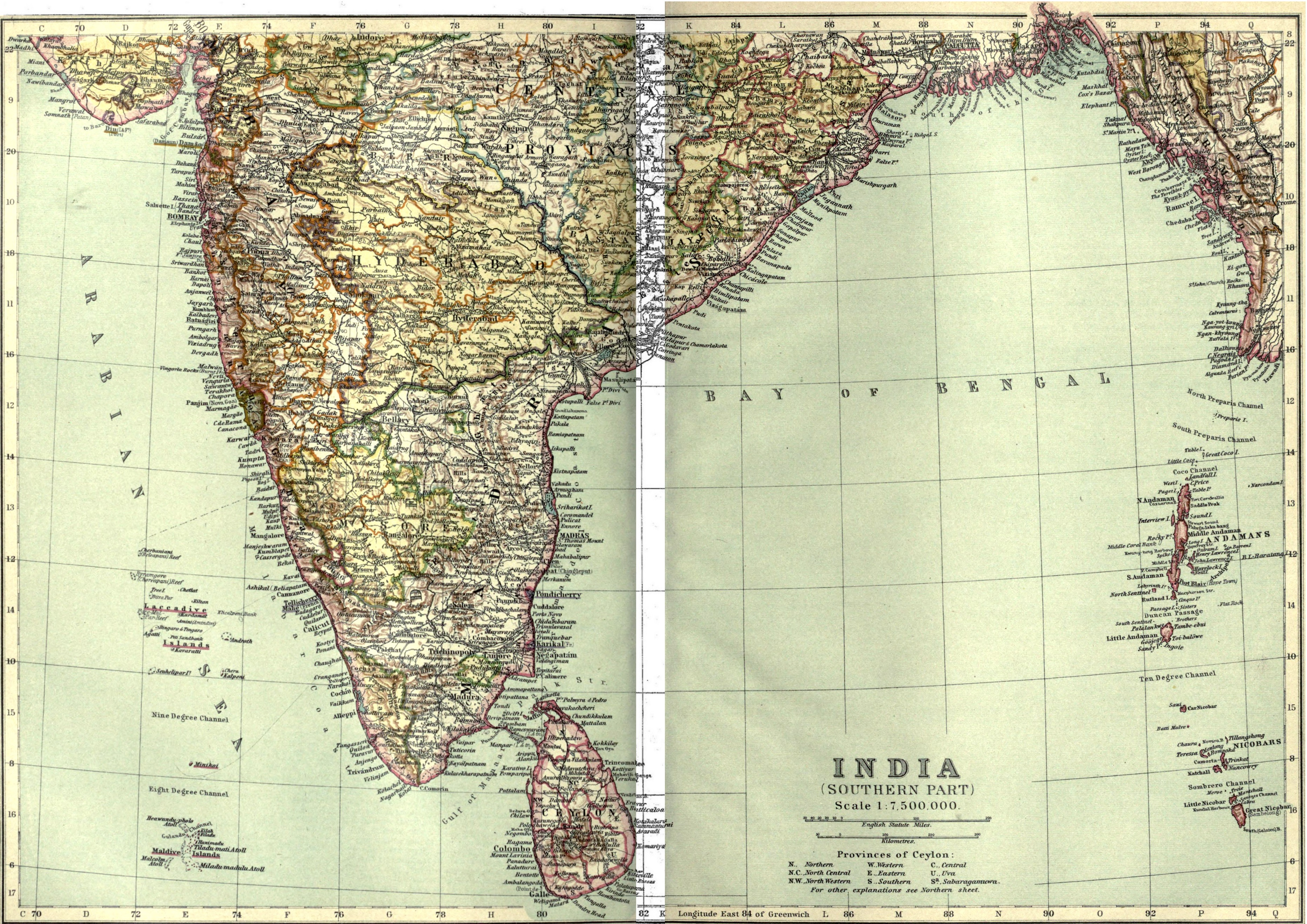
Malabar Coast in 1911 (On the southwestern region of the map)

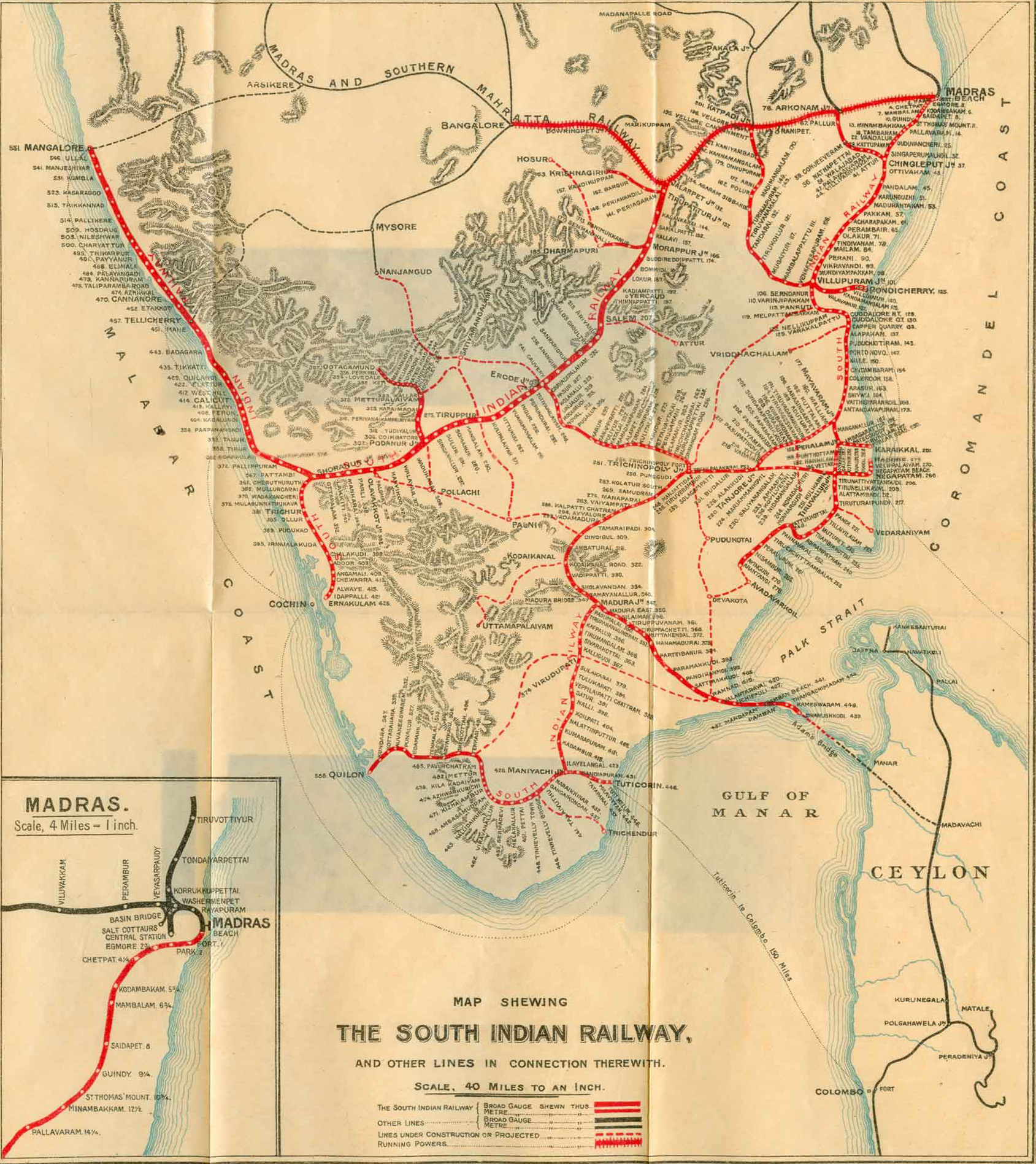
Map of Malabar Railway taken from Illustrated Guide to the South Indian Railway, printed by Hoe and Coat the 'Premier Press', Madras, 1913

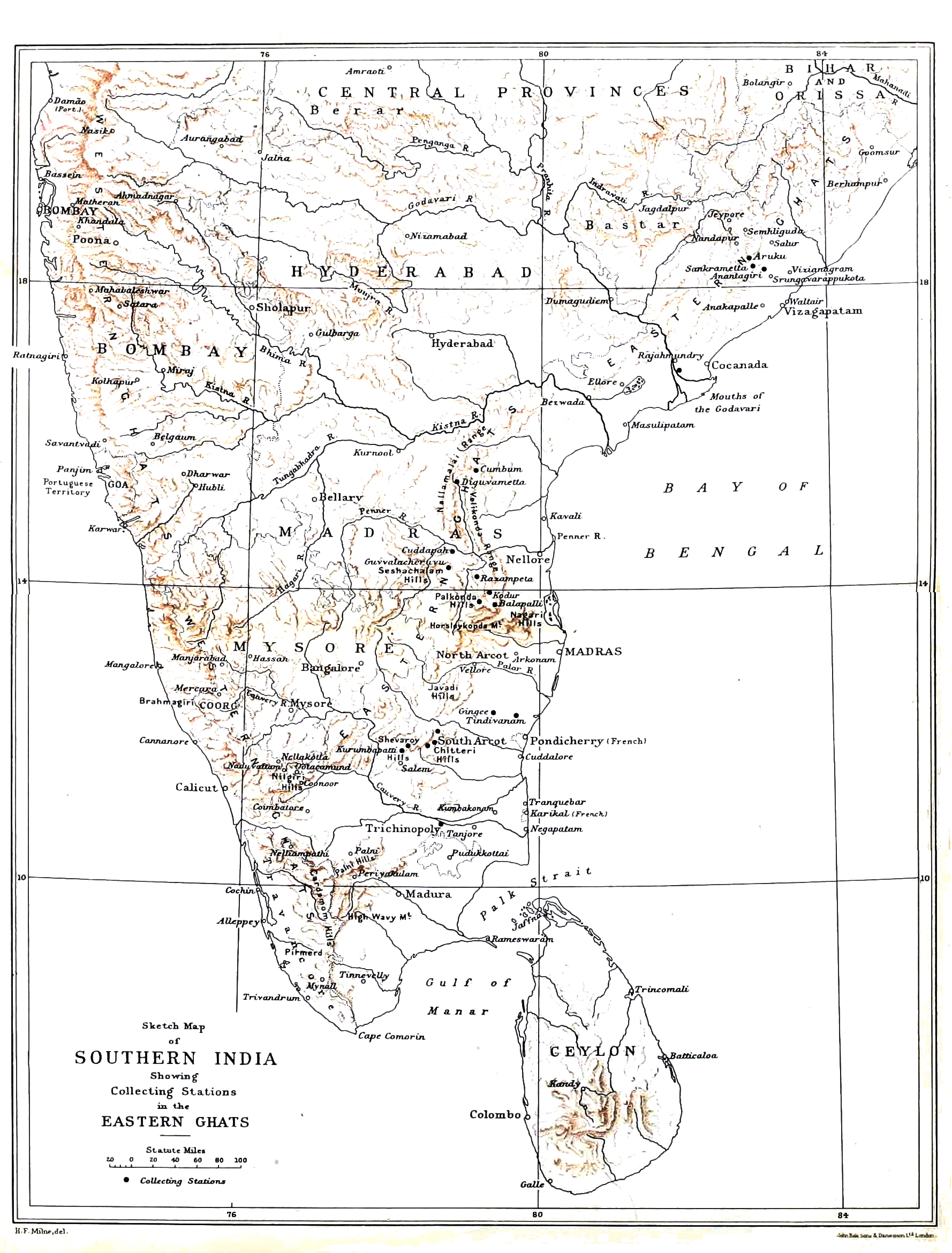
1932 map of Malabar Coast

== See also ==
- Zamorin
- Arakkal kingdom
- Kingdom of Mysore
- Dutch Malabar
- Treaty of Seringapatam
- Pazhassi Raja
- William Logan (author)
- North Malabar
- South Malabar
- Malabar pepper
- Kerala
- Lakshadweep
- Kozhikode district
- Wayanad district
- Nilgiris district
- Kannur district
- Kasaragod district
- Malappuram district
- Palakkad district
- Thrissur district
- Fort Kochi
- Kolathunadu
- Kingdom of Valluvanad
- Kingdom of Tanur
- Travancore
- Kingdom of Cochin
- Travancore-Cochin
- States Reorganisation Act, 1956
