= Alathur Assembly constituency =

Constituency of the Kerala legislative assembly in India

Coordinates: 10.65°N 76.55°E

Alathur
- Constituency No. 60 for the Kerala Legislative Assembly
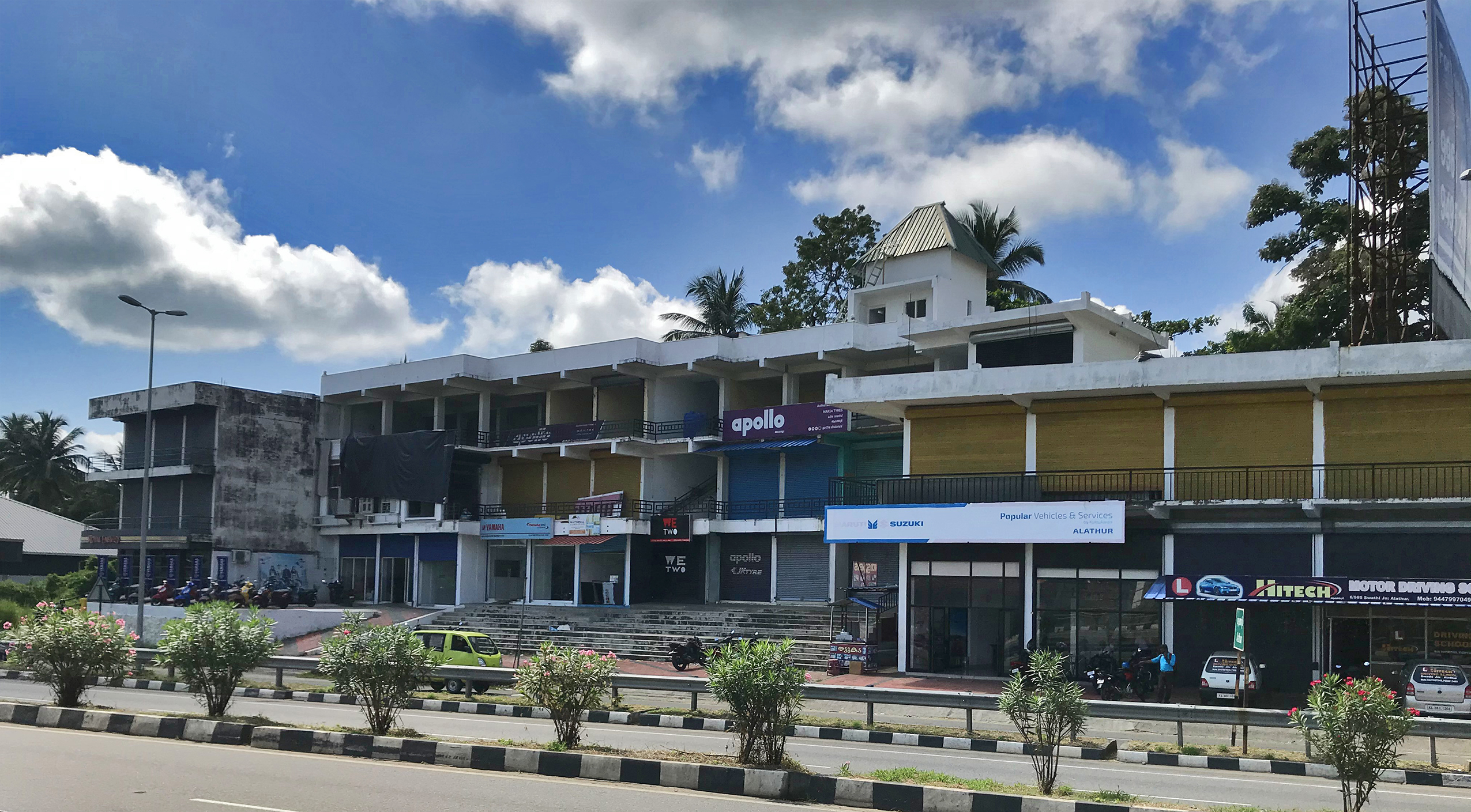
- NH 544 at Alathur town.

Constituency details
- Country: India
- Region: South India
- State: Kerala
- District: Palakkad
- Lok Sabha constituency: Alathur
- Established: 1957
- Total electors: 165,294 (2016)
- Reservation: None

Member of Legislative Assembly
- 16th Kerala Legislative Assembly
- Incumbent T. M. Sasi
- Party: CPI(M)
- Alliance: LDF
- Elected year: 2026

Alathur State assembly constituency is one of the 140 state legislative assembly constituencies in Kerala in southern India. It is also one of the seven state legislative assembly constituencies included in Alathur Lok Sabha constituency. As of the 2026 Assembly elections, the current MLA is T. M. Sasi of CPI(M).

== Local self-governed segments ==
Alathur Assembly constituency is composed of the following local self-governed segments:

Name	Status (grama panchayat/municipality)	Taluk
Alathur	Grama panchayat	Alathur
Erimayur	Grama panchayat	Alathur
Kizhakkanchery	Grama Panchayat	Alathur
Kuzhalmannam	Grama panchayat	Alathur
Melarcode	Grama panchayat	Alathur
Thenkurissi	Grama panchayat	Alathur
Vandazhi	Grama panchayat	Alathur

== Members of Legislative Assembly ==
The following list contains all members of Kerala Legislative Assembly who have represented Alathur Niyamasabha Constituency during the period of various assemblies:

Election	Niyama Sabha	Member	Party	Tenure	Majority
1957	1st	R. Krishnan	CPI	1957–1960	5,886
1960	2nd	R. Krishnan	CPI	1960–1965	9,224
1967	3rd	R. Krishnan	CPI(M)	1967–1970	12,407
1970	4th	R. Krishnan	CPI(M)	1970–1977	16,458
1977	5th	E. M. S. Namboodiripad	CPI(M)	1977–1980	1,999
1980	6th	C. T. Krishnan	CPI(M)	1980–1982	5,982
1982	7th	C. T. Krishnan	CPI(M)	1982–1987	11,314
1987	8th	C. K. Rajendran	CPI(M)	1987–1991	1,211
1991	9th	A. V. Gopinathan	INC	1991–1996	338
1996	10th	C. K. Rajendran	CPI(M)	1996–2001	12,166
2001	11th	V. Chenthamarakshan	CPI(M)	2001–2006	12,505
2006	12th	M. Chandran	CPI(M)	2006–2011	47,671
2011	13th	M. Chandran	CPI(M)	2011–2016	24,741
2016	14th	K. D. Prasenan	CPI(M)	2016–2021	36,060
2021	15th	K. D. Prasenan	CPI(M)	2021-2026	34,118
2026	16th	T. M. Sasi	CPI(M)	2026 -	8,553

== Election results ==
Percentage change (±%) denotes the change in the number of votes from the immediate previous election.

=== 2026 ===
2026 Kerala Legislative Assembly election: Alathur
Party	Candidate	Votes	%	±%
CPI(M)	T. M. Sasi	61,564	45.86	▼9.29
INC	K. M. Febin	53,011	39.49	▲9.55
BJP	K. V. Prasannakumar	17,347	12.92	▼0.64
BSP	M. T. Chandran	651	0.48	▼0.04
Independent	B. Febin	585	0.44	
NOTA	None of the above	1,071	0.80	▲0.22
Margin of victory		8,553	6.37	▼18.83
Turnout		1,34,229		
CPI(M) hold		Swing	▼9.29	

=== 2021 ===
Kerala Legislative Assembly election, 2021: Alathur
Party	Candidate	Votes	%	±%
CPI(M)	K. D. Prasenan	74,653	55.15	▼.4%
INC	Palayam Pradeep	40,535	29.94	▲2.6%
BJP	Prasanth Sivan	18,115	13.56	▼1.68%
BSP	Chandran	699	0.52	▼0.27%
Independent	Rajesh.M	347	0.26	−
NOTA	None of the above	783	0.58	▼0.26%
Majority		34,118	25.2	▼2.82%
Turnout		1,35,366		
CPI(M) hold		Swing		

=== 2016 ===
There were 165,294 registered voters in Alathur Constituency for the 2016 election.

2016 Kerala Legislative Assembly election: Alathur
Party	Candidate	Votes	%	±%
CPI(M)	K. D. Prasenan	71,206	55.35%	▼2.37%
KC(M)	K. Kusalakumar	35,146	27.32%	▼9.08%
BJP	M. P. Sreekumar	19,610	15.24%	▲10.53%
NOTA	None of the above	1,076	0.84%	−
BSP	Krishnankutty K.	1,010	0.79%	▼0.39%
Independent	Krishnankutty Kunissery	326	0.25%	−
Independent	M. Rajesh	265	0.21%	−
Margin of victory		36,060	28.03%	▲6.71
Turnout		1,28,639	77.82%	▲1.89
CPI(M) hold		Swing	▼2.37	

=== 2011 ===
There were 152,827 registered voters in the constituency for the 2011 election.

2011 Kerala Legislative Assembly election: Alathur
Party	Candidate	Votes	%	±%
CPI(M)	M. Chandran	66,977	57.72%	
KC(M)	K. Kusalakumar	42,236	36.40%	
BJP	K .A. Sulaiman	5,460	4.71%	
BSP	P .D. Paulose	1,372	1.18%	
Margin of victory		24,741	21.32%	
Turnout		1,16,045	75.93%	
CPI(M) win (new seat)				

=== 2006 ===
There were 157,841 registered voters in the constituency for the 2006 election.

2006 Kerala Legislative Assembly election: Alathur
Party	Candidate	Votes	%	±%
CPI(M)	M. Chandran	73,231	65.61%	
DIC	A. Raghavan	25,560	22.90%	
BJP	G. Salprakash	6,885	6.17%	
BSP	M. T. Chandran	1,869	1.67%	
Margin of victory		47,671	42.70%	
Turnout		1,11,629	70.72%	

=== 2001 ===
There were 154,832 registered voters in the constituency for the 2001 election.

2001 Kerala Legislative Assembly election: Alathur
Party	Candidate	Votes	%	±%
CPI(M)	V. Chenthamarakshan	59,485	52.92%	
INC	R. Chellama	46,980	41.80%	
BJP	Harigovidan	5,937	5.28%	
Margin of victory		12,505	11.12%	
Turnout		1,12,447	72.83%	

=== 1996 ===
There were 146,774 registered voters in the constituency for the 1996 election.

1996 Kerala Legislative Assembly election: Alathur
Party	Candidate	Votes	%	±%
CPI(M)	C. K. Rajendran	53,763	53.25%	
INC	R. Chellama	41,597	41.20%	
BJP	P. Krishankutty	3,313	3.28%	
Margin of victory		12,166	12.05%	
Turnout		1,02,725	69.98%	

=== 1991 ===
There were 136,727 registered voters in the constituency for the 1991 election.

1991 Kerala Legislative Assembly election: Alathur
Party	Candidate	Votes	%	±%
INC	A. V. Gopinathan	49,512	48.87%	
CPI(M)	V Sukumaran Master	49,174	48.53%	
BJP	N Bhagyalakshmi	2,009	1.98%	
Margin of victory		338	0.34%	
Turnout		1,01,324	74.92%	

=== 1987 ===
There were 116,246 registered voters in the constituency for the 1987 election.

1987 Kerala Legislative Assembly election: Alathur
Party	Candidate	Votes	%	±%
CPI(M)	C. K. Rajendran	44,381	49.77%	
Independent	C. S. Ramachandran Master	43,170	48.41%	
Margin of victory		1,211	1.36%	
Turnout		89,176	77.77%	

=== 1982 ===
There were 95,522 registered voters in the constituency for the 1982 election.

1982 Kerala Legislative Assembly election: Alathur
Party	Candidate	Votes	%	±%
CPI(M)	C T Krishnan	39,982	56.96%	
Independent	C K Balakrishnan	28,668	40.84%	
Margin of victory		11,314	16.12%	
Turnout		70,192	74.28%	

Year	Winner	Party	Votes	Runner up	Party	Votes	Margin
1980	C. T. Krishnan	CPM	36,244	K. P. Kaladharan	IND	30,262	5,982
1977	E. M. S. Namboodiripad	CPM	31,424	V. S. Vijayaraghavan	Indian National Congress	29,425	1,999
1970	R. Krishnan	CPM	34,193	P. M. Adulrahiman	IND	17,735	16,458
1967	R.Krishnan	CPM	25,467	Sarada	Indian National Congress		
1965	R.Krishnan	CPM	26,328	A. Narayanan	Indian National Congress	12,472	13,856
1960	R. Krishnan	Communist Party of India	31,159	A. Sunna Sahib	Indian National Congress	21,935	9,224
1957	Krishnan R.	Communist Party of India	19,203	Vaitheeswara Iyer P. S.	Indian National Congress	13,317	5,886

=== 1952 ===
1952 Madras Legislative Assembly election: Alathur
Party	Candidate	Votes	%	±%
CPI	K. Krishnan	37,042	30.51%	
KMPP	O. Koran	23,181	19.09%	
Independent	Y. R. Ramanatha Iyer	15,994	13.17%	
INC	E. Eacharan	14,033	11.56%	11.56%
INC	K. C. Pazhanimala	13,706	11.29%	11.29%
Independent	C. H. Koruman	5,024	4.14%	
Socialist	K. Chathan	4,671	3.85%	
Socialist	K. C. Sukumaran	4,394	3.62%	
Independent	K. Sankunny Nair	3,372	2.78%	
Margin of victory		13,861	11.42%	
Turnout		1,21,417	94.38%	
Registered electors		1,28,651		
CPI win (new seat)				

== See also ==
- Alathur
- Palakkad district
- List of constituencies of the Kerala Legislative Assembly
- 2016 Kerala Legislative Assembly election
