= K. D. Prasenan =

Indian politician

K. D. Prasenan MLA
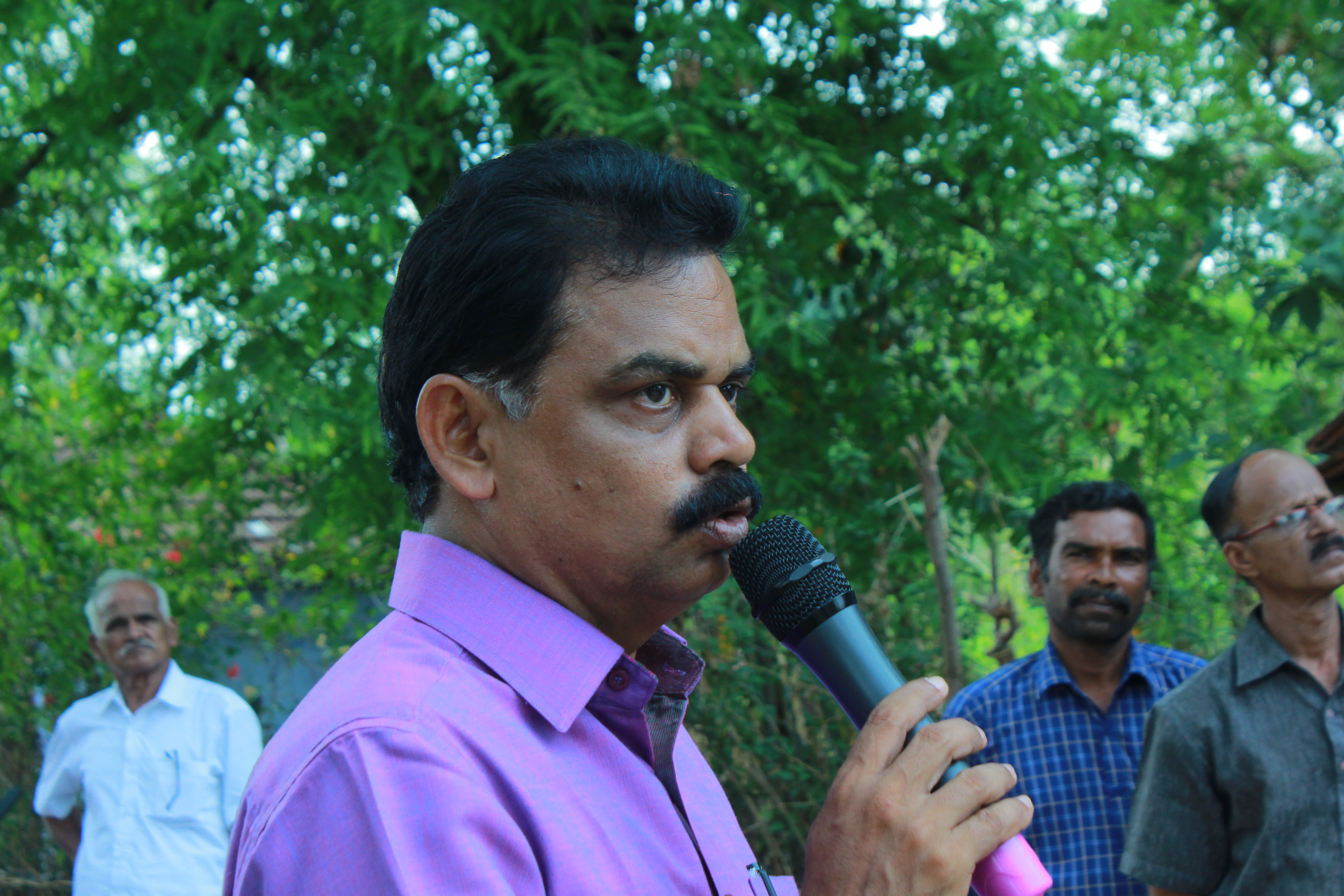

Member of the Kerala Legislative Assembly
- In office 2 June 2016 – 23 May 2026
- Preceded by: V. Chenthamarakshan
- Succeeded by: T. M. Sasi
- Constituency: Alathur

Personal details
- Born: Alathur, Palakkad, Kerala, India
- Party: Communist Party of India (Marxist)
- Spouse: Shamini Prasenan
- Children: 2 (Thejus Krishnan, Chethas Krishnan)
- Education: Sree Narayana College, Alathur

K. D. Prasenan is an Indian politician and a member of the Kerala Legislative Assembly who represented Alathur constituency.

== Political career ==
K. D. Prasenan started his political life as a member of SFI. He was a leader of DYFI. He is former President Of Democratic Youth Federation of India (DYFI) Palakkad District and former Secretary of CPIM Alathur Area Committee. He was elected to Kerala Legislative Assembly in 2016 and 2021 from Alathur constituency.

== See also ==
- Kerala Legislature
- V. Chenthamarakshan
- K. D. Prasenan
- K. Krishnankutty
- A. K. Balan
- P. Unni
- P. K. Sasi
- K. V. Vijayadas
- Muhammed Muhsin
- P. K. Biju
- U. R. Pradeep
