= List of candidates for the 2019 Indian general election in Kerala =

The following are the list of candidates for this election:

== List of elected MPs ==
No.	Constituency	Name of Elected M.P.	Party affiliation
1	Kasaragod	Rajmohan Unnithan	INC
2	Kannur	K. Sudhakaran	INC
3	Vatakara	K. Muraleedharan	INC
4	Wayanad	Rahul Gandhi	INC
5	Kozhikode	M. K. Raghavan	INC
6	Malappuram	P. K. Kunhalikutty	IUML
7	Ponnani	E. T. Mohammed Basheer	IUML
8	Palakkad	V. K. Sreekandan	INC
9	Alathur	Remya Haridas	INC
10	Thrissur	T. N. Prathapan	INC
11	Chalakudy	Benny Behanan	INC
12	Ernakulam	Hibi Eden	INC
14	Idukki	Dean Kuriakose	INC
13	Kottayam	Thomas Chalikkadan	KC(M)
15	Alappuzha	A. M. Ariff	CPI(M)
16	Mavelikkara	Kodikunnil Suresh	INC
17	Pathanamthitta	Anto Antony	INC
18	Kollam	N. K. Premachandran	RSP
19	Attingal	Adoor Prakash	INC
20	Thiruvananthapuram	Shashi Tharoor	INC

== Detailed results ==
2019 Indian general election in Kerala : Kasaragod
Party	Candidate	Votes	%	±%
INC	Rajmohan Unnithan	4,74,961	43.2%	▲4.40
CPI(M)	K. P. Sathishchandran	4,34,523	39.5%	Steady
BJP	Raveesh Thanthri Kuntar	1,76,049	16.0%	▼1.7
NOTA	None of the above	4,417	0.3%	▼0.2
Independent	Govindan B. Alinthazhe	2,670	0.2%	N/A
BSP	Basheer Alady	1,910	0.2%	▼0.1
Independent	Rameshan Bandadka	1,711	0.2%	N/A
Independent	Ranadivan. R. K	1,478	0.1%	N/A
Independent	Saji	1,278	0.1%	N/A
Independent	Narendra Kumar K.	1,054	0.1%	
Margin of victory		40,438	3.7%	
Turnout		10,95,634	83.9%	▲6.1
INC gain from CPI(M)		Swing		

2019 Indian general election in Kerala : Kannur
Party	Candidate	Votes	%	±%
INC	K. Sudhakaran	529,741	50.3%	▲5.8
CPI(M)	P. K. Sreemathy	435,182	41.3%	▼3.8
BJP	C. K. Padmanabhan	68,509	6.5%	▲1.0
SDPI	K. K. Abdul Jabbar	4,417	0.3%	▼1.7
NOTA	None of the above	3,828	0.3%	▼0.3
Independent	K. Sudhakaran	2,249	0.2%	N/A
SUCI(C)	R. Aparna	2,162	0.2%	N/A
Independent	Sudhakaran P. K	1,062	0.1%	N/A
Independent	P. Sreemathi	796	0.1%	N/A
Independent	Saji	1,278	0.1%	N/A
Independent	K. Sudhakaran	726	0.1%	N/A
Independent	K. Sreemathi	581	0.1%	N/A
Independent	Praveen Arimbrathodiyil	318	0.0%	N/A
Independent	Radhamani Narayanakumar	286	0.0%	N/A
Independent	Kuriakose	260	0.0%	N/A
Margin of victory		94,559	9.0%	
Turnout		10,50,014	87.4%	▲7.1
INC gain from CPI(M)		Swing		

2019 Indian general election in Kerala : Vadakara
Party	Candidate	Votes	%	±%
INC	K. Muraleedharan	5,26,755	49.4%	▲6.0
CPI(M)	P. Jayarajan	4,42,092	41.5%	▼1.6
BJP	V. K. Sajeevan	80,128	7.5%	▼0.5
NOTA	None of the above	3,415	0.3	▼0.2
SDPI	Musthafa Kommeri	5,544	0.5%	▼1.1
Independent	Jatheesh A. P.	2,833	0.3%	N/A
Independent	Santhosh Kumar	1,295	0.1%	N/A
Independent	Muraleedharan K.	910	0.1%	N/A
Independent	Jayarajan Pandaraparambil	690	0.1%	N/A
Independent	C. O. T. Naseer	612	0.1%	N/A
Independent	Muraleedharan K.	597	0.1%	N/A
CPI(ML) Red Star	K. Sudhakaran	507	0.0%	▼0.1
Independent	Aluva Aneesh	241	0.0%	N/A
Margin of victory		84,663	7.9%	▲7.6
Turnout		10,62,204	88.0%	▲7.1
INC hold		Swing	▲6.0	

2019 Indian general election in Kerala : Wayanad
Party	Candidate	Votes	%	±%
INC	Rahul Gandhi	7,06,367	64.7%	▲23.5
CPI(M)	P. P. Suneer	2,74,597	25.1%	▼13.9
BDJS	Tushar Vellappaly	78,816	7.2%	▼1.6
SDPI	Babu Mani	5,426	0.5%	▼1.1
NOTA	None of the above	2,155	0.2	▼0.7
Independent	Shijo M. Varghese	4,111	0.4%	N/A
Independent	Mujeeb Rahman	2,692	0.2%	N/A
BSP	Mohamed P K	2,691	0.2%	Steady
Independent	Rahul Gandhi K. E.	2,196	0.2%	N/A
Independent	Siby Vayalil	2,164	0.2%	N/A
Independent	Biju Kakkathode	2,090	0.2%	N/A
Independent	K. Padmarajan	1,887	0.2%	N/A
CPI(ML) Red Star	Usha K.	1,424	0.1%	Steady
Independent	Sreejith P. R.	1,208	0.1%	N/A
Independent	Praveen K. P.	1,102	0.1%	N/A
Independent	Raghul Gandhi K.	845	0.1%	N/A
Independent	Sebastian Wayanad	550	0.1%	N/A
Independent	John P. P.	544	0.2%	N/A
Independent	Thrissur Nazeer	523	0.0%	N/A
Independent	Narukara Gopi	489	0.0%	N/A
IGP	K. M. Sivaprasad Gandhi	320	0.0%	N/A
Margin of victory		84,663	7.9%	▲7.6
Turnout		10,62,204	88.0%	▲11.1
INC hold		Swing	▲23.5	

2019 Indian general election in Kerala : Kozhikode
Party	Candidate	Votes	%	±%
INC	M. K. Raghavan	493,444	45.9%	▲3.7
CPI(M)	A. Pradeepkumar	408,219	37.9%	▼2.5
BJP	Prakash Babu	161,216	15.0%	▲2.7
NOTA	None of the above	3,473	0.3%	▼0.2
BSP	Raghu K.	2,299	0.2%	Steady
Independent	Raghavan P. Vadakke Edoli	1,160	0.1%	N/A
Independent	Raghavan T. Thayyullayil	1,077	0.1%	N/A
SUCI(C)	A. Sekhar	1,031	0.1%	N/A
Independent	Raghavan Nair Manikkothu Kunnummal	962	0.1%	N/A
Independent	Pradeep Kumar E. T.	760	0.1%	N/A
Independent	Prakash Babu Chaithram	571	0.1%	N/A
Independent	Nusrath Jahan	558	0.1%	N/A
Independent	Pradeepan N.	551	0.1%	N/A
Independent	Raghavn N. Allachiparambu	462	0.0%	N/A
Independent	Pradeep V. K.	410	0.0%	N/A
Margin of victory		85,225	7.9%	▲5.9
Turnout		10,72,720	86.2%	▲7.1
INC hold		Swing	▲3.7	

2019 Indian general election in Kerala : Malappuram
Party	Candidate	Votes	%	±%
IUML	P. K. Kunhalikutty	589,873	57.0%	▲3.7
CPI(M)	V. P. Sanu	329,720	31.9%	▼2.5
BJP	Unnikrishnan	82,332	8.0%	▲2.7
SDPI	Abdul Majeed Faizy	19,106	1.8%	N/A
NOTA	None of the above	4,480	0.3%	▼1.5
Independent	Nissar Methar	3,687	0.4%	N/A
BSP	Praveen Kumar	2,294	0.2%	Steady
Independent	Sanu N. K.	2,203	0.2%	N/A
Independent	Abdul Salam K. P.	923	0.1%	N/A
Margin of victory		260,153	25.1%	▲5.9
Turnout		10,30,138	78.8%	▲7.1
IUML hold		Swing	▲3.7	

2019 Indian general election in Kerala : Ponnani
Party	Candidate	Votes	%	±%
IUML	E. T. Mohammed Basheer	521,824	51.3%	▲3.7
LDF	P. V. Anvar	328,551	32.3%	▼2.5
BJP	Rema	110,603	10.9%	▲2.7
SDPI	K.C. Nazeer	18,124	1.8%	Steady
Independent	Sameera Pa	16,288	1.6%	N/A
NOTA	None of the above	6,231	0.5%	▼0.1
Independent	Poonthura Siraj	6,122	0.6%	N/A
Independent	Anvar P. V.	3,109	0.3%	N/A
Independent	Muhammed Basheer Mangalassery	1,957	0.2%	N/A
Independent	Anwar P. V. Alumkuzhi	1,784	0.2%	N/A
Independent	Muhammed Basheer Nechiyan	1,315	0.1%	N/A
Independent	Muhammed Basheer Koyissery	693	0.1%	N/A
Independent	Bindu	664	0.1%	N/A
Margin of victory		193,273	19.0%	▲5.9
Turnout		10,11,034	79.9%	▲7.1
IUML hold		Swing	▲3.7	

2019 Indian general election in Kerala : Palakkad
Party	Candidate	Votes	%	±%
INC	V. K. Sreekandan	399,274	38.8%	−
CPI(M)	M. B. Rajesh	387,637	37.7%	▼7.7
BJP	C. Krishnakumar	218,556	21.3%	▲6.3
NOTA	None of the above	6,665	0.5%	▼0.4
SDPI	Thulaseedharan Pallickal	5,749	0.6%	▼0.8
Independent	C. Chandran	2,624	0.3%	N/A
BSP	Hari Arumbil	2,408	0.2%	Steady
Independent	Rajesh Palolam	2,234	0.2%	N/A
Independent	Rajesh	2,128	0.1%	N/A
Independent	Balakrishnan	974	0.1%	N/A
Margin of victory		11,637	1.1%	
Turnout		10,21,584	80.1%	▲5.7
INC gain from CPI(M)		Swing		

2019 Indian general election in Kerala : Alathur
Party	Candidate	Votes	%	±%
INC	Ramya Haridas	533,815	52.4%	▲12.0
CPI(M)	P. K. Biju	374,847	36.8%	▼7.6
BDJS	T. V. Babu	89,837	8.8%	▼0.7
NOTA	None of the above	7,722	0.6%	▼1.2
BSP	Jayan C. Kuthanur	5,505	0.5%	Steady
Independent	Pretheep Kumar P. K.	4,301	0.4%	N/A
Independent	Krishnankutty Kunissery	2,716	0.3%	N/A
Margin of victory		1,58,968	15.6%	
Turnout		10,11,021	82.9%	▲8.4
INC gain from CPI(M)		Swing		

2019 Indian general election in Kerala : Thrissur
Party	Candidate	Votes	%	±%
INC	T. N. Prathapan	415,089	39.8%	▲1.7
CPI	Rajaji Mathew Thomas	321,456	30.9%	▼11.4
BJP	Suresh Gopi	293,822	28.2%	▲17.0
NOTA	None of the above	4,253	0.3%	▼0.5
BSP	Nikhil Chandrasekharan	2,551	0.2%	Steady
CPI(ML) Red Star	N. D. Venu	1,330	0.1%	Steady
Independent	Suvith	1,133	0.1%	N/A
Independent	Sonu	1,130	0.1%	N/A
Independent	Praveen K. P.	1,105	0.1%	N/A
Margin of victory		93,633	9.0%	
Turnout		10,37,616	81.8%	▲10.4
INC gain from CPI		Swing		

2019 Indian general election in Kerala : Chalakkudy
Party	Candidate	Votes	%	±%
INC	Benny Behanan	473,444	39.8%	▲0.8
LDF	Innocent	321,456	30.9%	▼9.6
BJP	A. N. Radhakrishnan	154,159	15.6%	▲5.1
NOTA	None of the above	7,578	0.7%	▼0.2
SDPI	P. P. Moideen Kunju	4,687	0.5%	▼1.1
BSP	Johnson N.	2,131	0.2%	Steady
PDP	Mujeeb Rahman T. A.	1,467	0.1%	N/A
Independent	M. R. Sathyadevan	1,432	0.1%	N/A
Independent	Subramanian	1,000	0.1%	N/A
Independent	Suja Antony	930	0.1%	N/A
Independent	Jose Thomas	871	0.1%	N/A
Independent	Fredy Jackson Pereira	682	0.1%	N/A
Independent	Johnson K. C.	355	0.0%	N/A
Independent	Noby Augustine	318	0.0%	N/A
Margin of victory		132,274	13.4%	
Turnout		9,82,646	84.5%	▲8.6
INC gain from LDF		Swing		

2019 Indian general election in Kerala : Ernakulam
Party	Candidate	Votes	%	±%
INC	Hibi Eden	491,263	50.8%	▲9.2
CPI(M)	P. Rajeev	322,110	33.3%	▲1.9
BJP	Alphons Kannanthanam	137,749	14.2%	▲2.6
NOTA	None of the above	5,378	0.5%	▼0.3
SDPI	V. M. Faizal	4,309	0.4%	▼1.3
BSP	P. A. Niamathulla	1,343	0.1%	▼0.2
Independent	Abdul Khader Vazhakkala	932	0.1%	N/A
API	Rajeev Nagan	821	0.1%	N/A
Independent	Laila Rasheed	797	0.1%	N/A
Independent	Kumar	604	0.1%	N/A
Independent	Sreedharan	554	0.1%	N/A
Independent	Aswathi Rajappan	494	0.1%	N/A
CPI(ML) Red Star	Shajahan Abdulkhadar	470	0.0%	▼0.1
Independent	Vivek K. Vijayan	379	0.0%	N/A
Margin of victory		1,69,153	17.5%	▲7.3
Turnout		9,61,825	80.8%	▲8.1
INC hold		Swing	▲9.2	

2019 Indian general election in Kerala : Idukki
Party	Candidate	Votes	%	±%
INC	Dean Kuriakose	498,493	54.2%	▲13.8
LDF	Joice George	327,440	35.6%	▼11.0
BDJS	Biju Krishnan	78,648	8.6%	▲2.4
NOTA	None of the above	5,317	0.5%	▼0.6
BSP	Leethesh P. T.	2,906	0.3%	Steady
Independent	Gomathy	1,985	0.2%	▼0.2
VCK	M. Selvaraj	1,628	0.2%	N/A
Independent	Baby K. A.	1,556	0.2%	N/A
Independent	Reji Njallani	1,324	0.1%	N/A
Margin of victory		1,71,053	18.6%	
Turnout		9,13,980	78.7%	▲9.0
INC gain from LDF		Swing		

2019 Indian general election in Kerala : Kottayam
Party	Candidate	Votes	%	±%
KC(M)	Thomas Chazhikadan	4,21,046	46.3%	▼4.7
CPI(M)	V. N. Vasavan	314,787	34.6%	▼1.9
KC(AMG)	P. C. Thomas	155,135	17.0%	−
BSP	Jijo Joseph	7,403	0.8%	Steady
NOTA	None of the above	7,191	0.6%	▼0.6
SUCI(C)	E. V. Prakash	2,216	0.2%	▼0.1
Independent	Thomas J. Nidhiry	1,496	0.2%	N/A
Independent	Ignatious Illimoottil	1,065	0.1%	N/A
Margin of victory		1,06,259	11.7%	▼2.8
Turnout		9,03,148	77.3%	▲6.9
KC(M) hold		Swing	▼4.7	

2019 Indian general election in Kerala : Alappuzha
Party	Candidate	Votes	%	±%
CPI(M)	A. M. Ariff	4,45,970	41.0%	▼3.4
INC	Shanimol Usman	4,35,496	40.0%	▼6.4
BJP	K. S. Radhakrishnan	1,87,729	17.2%	−
NOTA	None of the above	6,104	0.5%	▼0.4
SDPI	K. S. Shan	3,595	0.3%	▼0.8
BSP	Prasanth bhim	2,431	0.2%	▼0.1
API	A. Akhilesh	1,782	0.2%	N/A
PDP	Varkala Raj	1,689	0.2%	N/A
SUCI(C)	R. Parthasarathy Varma	1,133	0.1%	▼0.5
Independent	Satheesh Shenoi	783	0.1%	N/A
Independent	Santhosh Thuravoor	749	0.1%	N/A
Independent	Vayalar Rajeevan	696	0.1%	N/A
Independent	Thahir	571	0.1%	N/A
Margin of victory		10,474	1.0%	
Turnout		10,82,624	83.4%	▲5.7
CPI(M) gain from INC		Swing		

2019 Indian general election in Kerala : Mavelikkara
Party	Candidate	Votes	%	±%
INC	Kodikunnil Suresh	4,40,415	45.4%	▲0.1
CPI	Chittayam Gopakumar	3,79,277	39.1%	▼2.5
BDJS	Thazhava Sahadevan	1,33,546	13.8%	▲4.8
NOTA	None of the above	5,754	0.5%	▼0.3
BSP	Thollur Rajagopalan	3,864	0.4%	Steady
Independent	Kuttan Kattachira	1,982	0.2%	N/A
Independent	Usha Kottarakkara	1,620	0.2%	N/A
SUCI(C)	K. Bimalji	1,450	0.1%	▼0.4
Independent	Raghavan R.	1,314	0.1%	▼0.5
Independent	Ajayakumar	1,211	0.1%	N/A
Independent	Aji Pathanapuram	602	0.1%	N/A
Margin of victory		61,138	6.3%	▲2.6
Turnout		9,65,281	76.3%	▲6.1
INC hold		Swing	▲0.1	

2019 Indian general election in Kerala : Pathanamthitta
Party	Candidate	Votes	%	±%
INC	Anto Antony	3,80,927	37.1%	▼4.3
CPI(M)	Veena George	3,36,684	32.8%	▼2.0
BJP	K. Surendran	297,396	29.0%	▲13.0
BSP	Shibu Parakkadavan	3,814	0.4%	▼0.8
NOTA	None of the above	3,352	0.3%	▼0.9
Independent	Veena V.	1,809	0.2%	N/A
API	Jose George	1,355	0.1%	N/A
SUCI(C)	Binu Baby	622	0.1%	▼0.2
Independent	Ratheesh Choorakodu	594	0.1%	▼0.5
Margin of victory		44,243	4.3%	▼2.2
Turnout		10,23,201	76.8%	▲12.4
INC hold		Swing	▼4.3	

2019 Indian general election in Kerala : Kollam
Party	Candidate	Votes	%	±%
RSP	N. K. Premachandran	4,99,677	51.6%	▲5.1
CPI(M)	K. N. Balagopal	3,50,821	36.2%	▼6.0
BJP	K. V. Sabu	1,03,339	10.7%	▲4.0
NOTA	None of the above	6,018	0.5%	▼0.1
Independent	Saji Kollam	2,629	0.3%	N/A
Independent	Suni Kalluvathukkal	1,708	0.2%	N/A
SUCI(C)	Twinkle Prabhakaran	1,319	0.1%	N/A
Independent	Sreekumar J.	1,150	0.1%	N/A
Independent	N. Jayarajan	830	0.1%	N/A
Independent	Nagaraj G.	632	0.1%	N/A
Margin of victory		1,48,856	15.4%	▲11.1
Turnout		9,62,105	77.4%	▲6.0
RSP hold		Swing	▲5.1	

2019 Indian general election in Kerala : Attingal
Party	Candidate	Votes	%	±%
INC	Adoor Prakash	3,80,995	37.9%	▲0.3
CPI(M)	A. Sampath	3,42,748	34.1%	▼8.6
BJP	Sobha Surendran	1,03,339	10.7%	▲0.2
NOTA	None of the above	5,685	0.4%	▼0.2
Independent	Sunil Soman	5,433	0.5%	N/A
SDPI	Ajamal Ismail	5,429	0.5%	▼0.8
BSP	Vipinlal Palode	4,068	0.4%	▼0.6
Independent	Satheesh Kumar	2,179	0.2%	N/A
Independent	Shailaja Navaikulam	2,146	0.2%	N/A
Independent	Ramsagar P.	1,568	0.2%	N/A
Independent	K. G. Mohanan	1,146	0.1%	N/A
Independent	Maheen Thevarupara	1,084	0.1%	N/A
Independent	Manoj M. Poovakkadu	1,004	0.2%	N/A
Independent	Attingal Ajith Kumar	781	0.1%	N/A
Independent	K. Vivekanandhan	668	0.1%	N/A
Independent	Anitha	436	0.2%	N/A
Independent	Irinjayam Suresh	412	0.0%	N/A
Independent	Prakash G.	402	0.0%	N/A
Independent	Prakash S. Karikkattuvila	355	0.0%	N/A
Independent	B. Devadathan	268	0.2%	N/A
Margin of victory		38,247	3.8%	▼4.3
Turnout		9,99,203	76.1%	▲8.0
INC hold		Swing	▲0.3	

2019 Indian general election in Kerala : Thiruvananthapuram
Party	Candidate	Votes	%	±%
INC	Shashi Tharoor	4,16,131	41.2%	▲5.1
BJP	Kummanam Rajasekharan	3,16,142	31.3%	▼1.0
CPI(M)	C. Divakaran	2,58,556	25.6%	▼2.9
NOTA	None of the above	4,580	0.3%	Steady
Independent	Mithra Kumar G.	3,521	0.3%	N/A
BSP	Kiran Kumar S. K.	2,535	0.5%	▲0.1
Independent	Vishnu S. Ambadi	1,822	0.2%	N/A
PNP	Pandalam Keralavarmaraja	1,695	0.2%	N/A
Independent	M. S. Subi	1,050	0.1%	N/A
Independent	T. Sasi	1,007	0.1%	N/A
SUCI(C)	S. Mini	664	0.1%	▼0.1
Independent	Binu D.	604	0.1%	N/A
Independent	Nandhavanam Suseelan	465	0.0%	N/A
Independent	Christopher Shaju Paliyode	345	0.0%	N/A
Independent	Gopakumar Oorupoika	339	0.0%	N/A
Independent	Johny Thampy	267	0.0%	N/A
Independent	B. Devadathan	258	0.0%	N/A
Independent	Jain Wilson	199	0.0%	N/A
Margin of victory		99,989	9.9%	▲8.1
Turnout		10,05,600	75.6%	▲7.2
INC hold		Swing	▲5.1	
