= Kottayi =

Kottayi may refer to

- Kottayi-I, a village in Palakkad district, Kerala, India
- Kottayi-II, a village in Palakkad district, Kerala, India
- Kottayi (gram panchayat), a gram panchayat serving the above villages
