= Chittilamchery =

- Village
- Location in Kerala, India Chittilamchery (India)
- Coordinates: 10.60°N 76.55°E
- Country: India
- State: Kerala
- District: Palakkad
- Established: 1965 മാര്‍ച്ച് 15

Area
  - Land: 25.52 km^{2} (9.85 sq mi)

Population (2010)
  - Total: 24,540

Languages
  - Official: Malayalam, English
- Time zone: UTC+5:30 (IST)
- PIN: 678704
- Area code: +91 4922
- Vehicle registration: KL-49, KL-9

Chittilamchery (also known as Chittlancherry or Chittalancheri) is a village in the Palakkad district of Kerala located in Vadakkanchery - Kollengode main road. It is under the administration of the Melarcode Panchayath in the Alathur Taluk.

== Etymology ==
The name is possibly derived from "Chuttilam Chery", which means a place surrounded by "illams" (houses of Nambudiris). Odiyamkadu in Chittlancherry which is now presently called Kodiyankadu was a place for the Odiyans who practised black magic during British regime. Womenfolk were advised not to venture out alone in the dark. With the British regime banning Odiyam cult or seva the tradition ceased to exist

== History ==
The first school in Chittilamcherry was established in 1885 by Ramu Iyyer. 15 March 1965 saw the formation of the first Melarcode Panchayth presided over by T. N. Parameswaran.

== Economy ==
Majority population of the village rely on agriculture as their primary source of income while minority rely on income earned from various field like banking, information technology, and business. Facilities, such as internet facilities, Akshaya Center and mobile tower communications are already developed. The village, located on the State Highway 58, is a crucial junction for commuters. More medical facilities are needed as villagers still need to depend on places like Coimbatore or Thrissur in case of medical emergencies The village comes under the Melarcode Panchayath, block office is at Nemmara and part of Alathur Taluk.

== Cinema ==
The 2019 film Manoharam, starring Vineeth Sreenivasan was filmed at this location.

The 2012 Film Molly Aunty Rocks, starring Prithviraj was partially filmed at this location.

== Education ==
Chittilamchery has a number of schools including MNKM Higher secondary school (founded in 1947), AUPS Chittilamchery, Muthukunni ALP School, and AUPS Melarcode, and NSS Lower Primary English Medium School.

== Religion ==
Sree Cherunetturi Bhagavathi Temple, or Chittilamchery Kaavu, is located in the village. The presiding deity is Sri Cherunatturi Amma, or Sri Cherinattury Bhagavathy. The village is mostly Hindu, but also has Muslims and Christians who actively participate in village activities such as Chittilamchery Vela, an annual event that takes place on the 28/29 April in honor of the presiding deity. Aarattu is also celebrated in the Sri Cherunatoori Bhagavathi Temple during a week at the end of January in which cultural programs, bhajanas and devotional songs are presented. Malma kali (porattan kali) is also practiced within the temple premises.

Other important temples are Swarganatha Temple, Arakunni Siva Temple and Tazhakottu Kavu.

== Festivals ==
The Chittilamchery Vela is a type of pooram, a religious festival that takes place every year. Vela is celebrated on 28 or 29 April, 15 days after Vishu, and it is hosted by Sri Cherunattury Temple. It features a multi-storied pandhal with illumination, Panchavadyam, fireworks and stage shows (Gana mela). Chamaya-Pradarsanam [exhibition of the elephant's decorations] happens at the nearest school auditorium on the day before the festival.

Other festivals in the temple are Aarattu and Malama kali.

== Geography ==
Chittilamchery is a village containing several small ponds (including Aanaari kolam, Kakkatu kolam, Pathyila kolam, Choram kulam, Nochukulam, and Kappal Kulam) and surrounded by paddy fields.

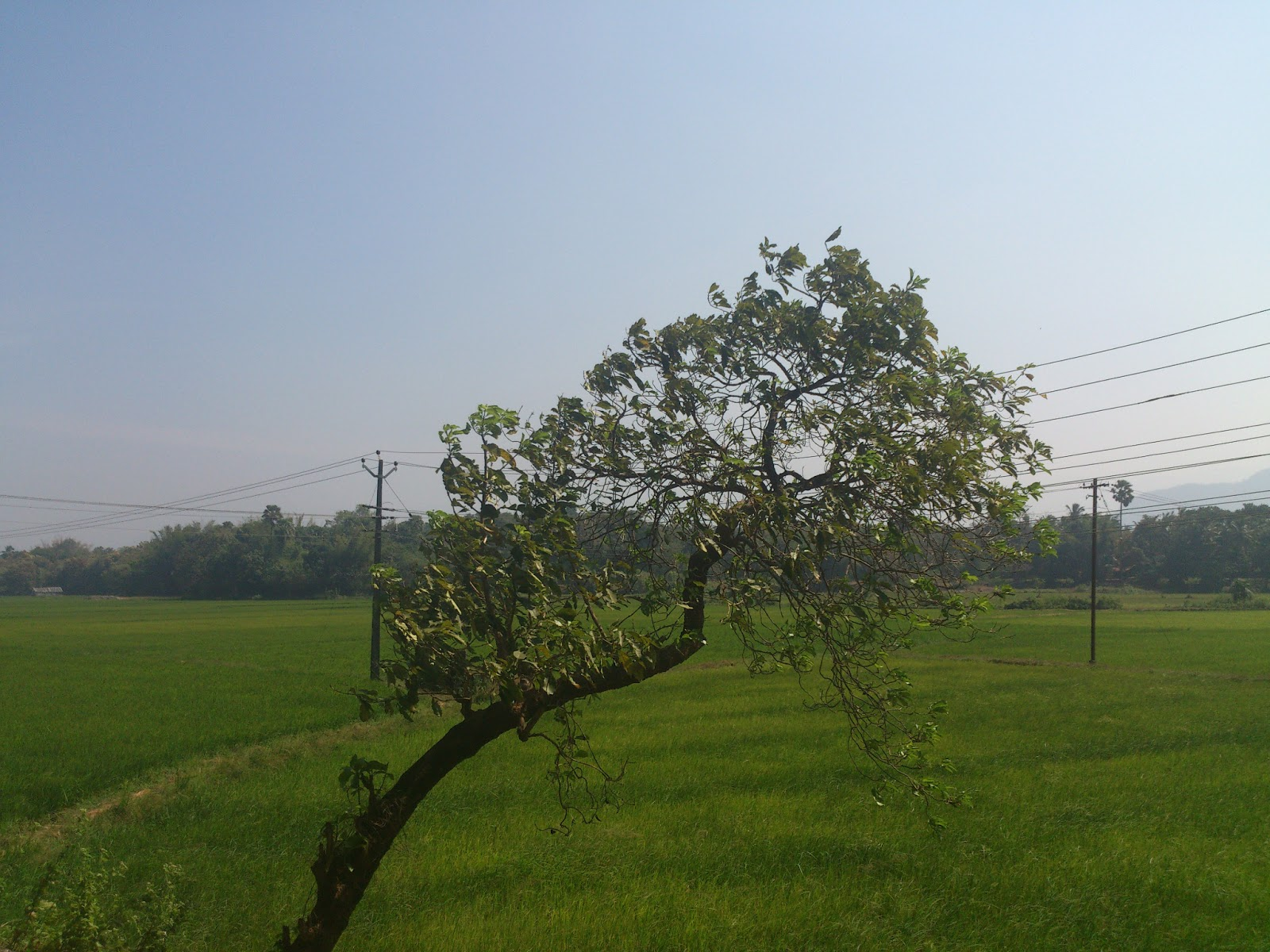
Chittilamchery paddy fields

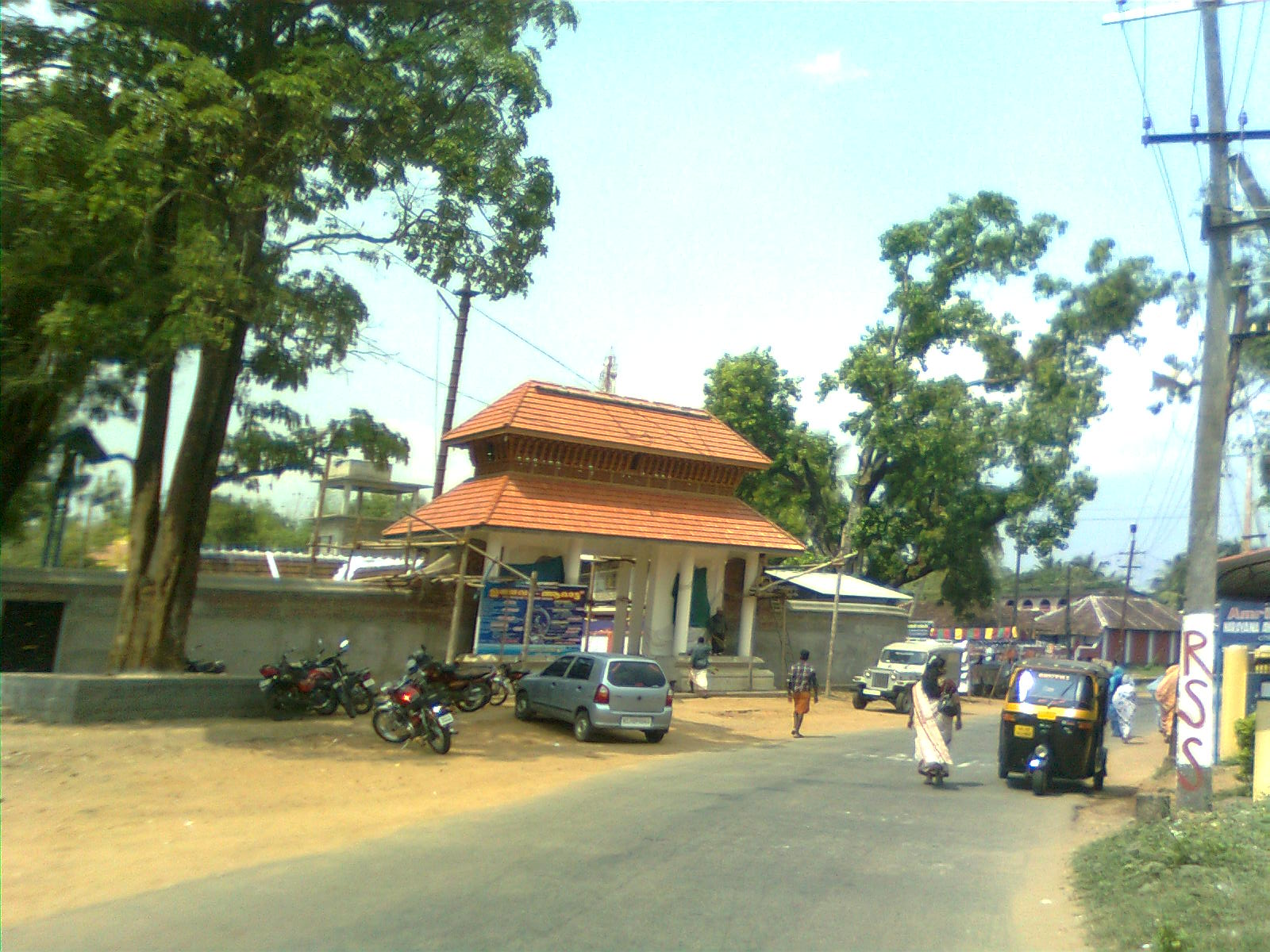
Cherunettury Temple Chittilamchery

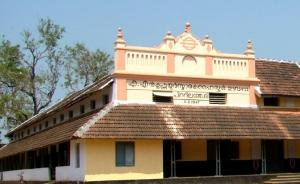
MNKMHSS Chittilamchery

Chittilamchery is located 4 kilometers from Nenmara, which is known for the Nenmara-Vallangi Vela, and is 7 kilometers from Alathur Taluk. Its location, on the main road of the Pollachi–Thrissur bus route SH58, makes this village a busy junction.

- Village: മേലാർകോട് (Melarcode)
- Taluk: ആലത്തൂർ (Alathur)
- Assembly Constituency: ആലത്തൂർ (Alathur)
- Parliament Constituency: ആലത്തൂർ (Alathur) (Palakkad [പാലക്കാട്] before 2010)
- No of Wards: 16
- Population: 23,706
- Male: 11,497
- Female: 12,209
- Population Density: 929
- Source: Census data 2001

Boundaries

- North: Alathur, Erimayur
- East: Pallassana, Nemmara
- South: Ayiloor
- West: Vandazhi, Vadakkencherry

=== Distance from nearby towns and cities ===
Thrissur - 42.7 km

Palakkad - 29.7 km

Vadakkenchery - 9.4 km

Alathur - 7.6 km

Mudapallur - 3.8 km

Thripallur - 6.2 km

Nenmara - 5.6 km

Kollengode - 18.1 km

Govindapuram - 33.4 km
