= Kottachantha =

Village in Palakkad District, Kerala, India

Kottachantha is a village in Palakkad District of Kerala state, South India. It is 18 km away from Palakkad town under Alathur Taluk and spreads into Kottayi and Peringottukurissi grama panchayat. Mainly speak in Malayalam and English, Tamil and Hindi. The name of the village comes from two combination words which are ‘Kotta’ and ‘Chantha’ which means fort and market.

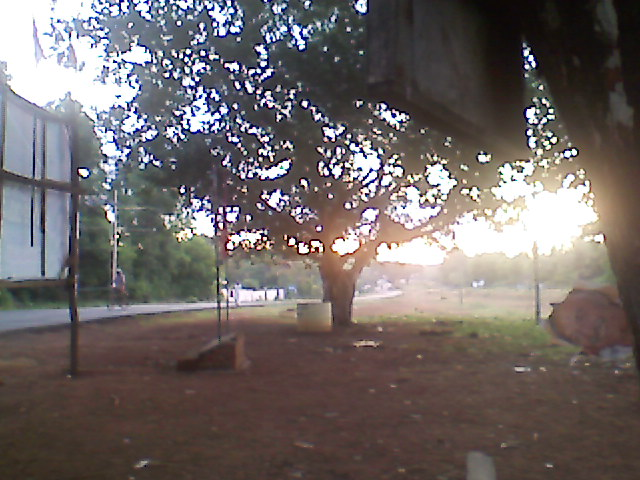
Kottachantha
