= Peringottukurissi =

Peringottukurissi may refer to

- Peringottukurissi-I, a village in Palakkad district, Kerala, India
- Peringottukurissi-II, a village in Palakkad district, Kerala, India
- Peringottukurissi (gram panchayat), a gram panchayat which serves the above villages
