= Thenkurissi =

Thenkurissi may refer to

- Thenkurissi-I, a village in Palakkad district, Kerala, India
- Thenkurissi-II, a village in Palakkad district, Kerala, India
- Thenkurissi (gram panchayat), a gram panchayat serving the above villages
