= Chelakkara Assembly constituency =

Constituency of the Kerala legislative assembly in India

Chelakkara
- Constituency No. 61 for the Kerala Legislative Assembly
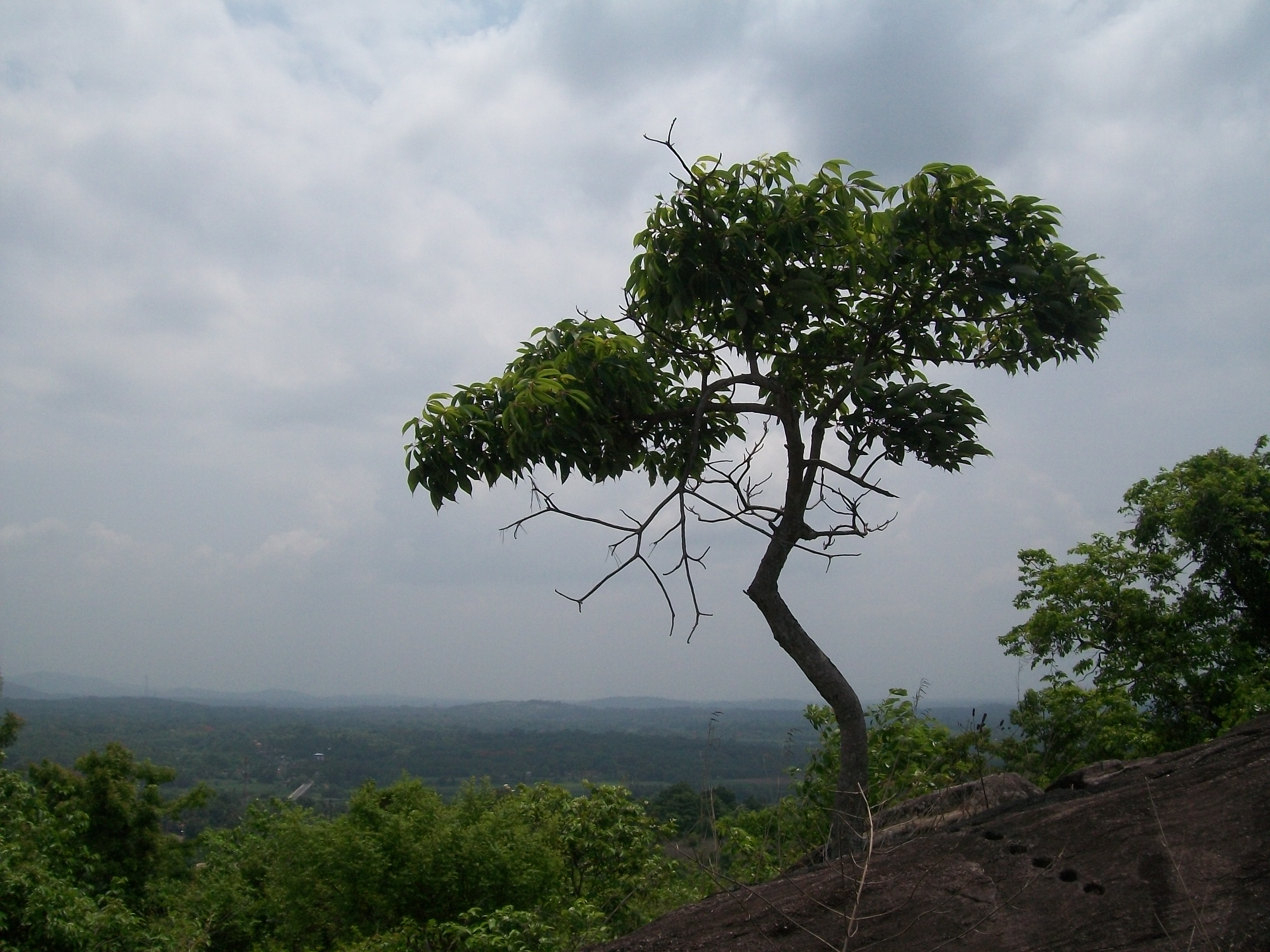
- A hill at Thiruvilwamala in Chelakkara Assembly constituency

Constituency details
- Country: India
- Region: South India
- State: Kerala
- District: Thrissur
- Lok Sabha constituency: Alathur
- Established: 1965
- Total electors: 1,98,086 (2021)
- Reservation: SC

Member of Legislative Assembly
- 16th Kerala Legislative Assembly
- Incumbent U. R. Pradeep
- Party: CPI(M)
- Alliance: LDF
- Elected year: 2026

Chelakkara is one of the 140 state legislative assembly constituencies in Kerala. It is also one of the seven state legislative assembly constituencies included in Alathur Lok Sabha constituency. As of the 2026 assembly election, the MLA is U. R. Pradeep of Communist Party of India (Marxist).

== Local self-governed segments ==
Local Bodies in Chelakkara (State Assembly constituency)

Chelakkara Assembly constituency is composed of the following local self-governed segments:

Name	Status (Grama panchayat/Municipality)	Taluk
Chelakkara	Grama panchayat	Thalapilly
Desamangalam	Grama panchayat	Thalapilly
Kondazhy	Grama panchayat	Thalapilly
Mullurkara	Grama panchayat	Thalapilly
Panjal	Grama panchayat	Thalapilly
Pazhayannur	Grama panchayat	Thalapilly
Thiruvilwamala	Grama panchayat	Thalapilly
Vallathol Nagar	Grama panchayat	Thalapilly
Varavoor	Grama panchayat	Thalapilly

== Members of the Legislative Assembly ==
The following list contains all members of Kerala Legislative Assembly who have represented the constituency:

Election	Niyama Sabha	Member	Party
1967	3rd	P. Kunhan	Indian National Congress
1970	4th	K. K. Balakrishnan	Indian National Congress
1977	5th	K. K. Balakrishnan	Indian National Congress
1980	6th	K. K. Balakrishnan	Indian National Congress
1982	7th	C. K. Chakrapani	Communist Party of India
1987	8th	M. A. Kuttappan	Indian National Congress
1991	9th	M. P. Thami	Indian National Congress
1996	10th	K. Radhakrishnan	Communist Party of India
2001	11th	K. Radhakrishnan	Communist Party of India
2006	12th	K. Radhakrishnan	Communist Party of India
2011	13th	K. Radhakrishnan	Communist Party of India
2016	14th	U. R. Pradeep	Communist Party of India
2021	15th	K. Radhakrishnan	Communist Party of India
2024 ^	15th	U. R. Pradeep	Communist Party of India
2026	16th	U. R. Pradeep	Communist Party of India

^by-election

== Election results ==
=== 2026 ===
2026 Kerala Legislative Assembly election: Chelakkara
Party	Candidate	Votes	%	±%
CPI(M)	U. R. Pradeep	76,073	46.62	▲5.18
Independent	Sivan Veettikkunnu	46,687	28.61	▼5.03
BJP	K. Balakrishnan	37,286	22.85	▲1.36
SDPI	Vinodkumar	1,204	0.73	
AAP	Subramaniyan K. V.	669	0.41	
NOTA	None of the above	1,232	0.75	▲0.09
Margin of victory		29,386	18.01	▲10.22
Turnout		1,63,151		
CPI(M) hold		Swing	▲5.18	

=== 2024 by-election ===
There were 2,13,103 eligible voters in the 2024 Chelakkara Assembly constituency by-election.

2024 Kerala Legislative Assembly by-election: Chelakkara
Party	Candidate	Votes	%	±%
CPI(M)	U. R. Pradeep	64,827	41.44	▼9.97
INC	Ramya Haridas	52,626	33.64	▲4.93
BJP	K. Balakrishnan	33,609	21.49	▲5.81
Independent	N. K. Sudheer	3,920	2.50	New
NOTA	None of the above	1,034	0.66	▲0.19
Majority		12,201	7.79	▼17.91
Turnout		1,56,426	73.40	▼4.00
CPI(M) hold		Swing	▼9.97	

=== 2021 ===
There were 1,98,086 registered voters in the constituency for the 2021 election.

2021 Kerala Legislative Assembly election: Chelakkara
Party	Candidate	Votes	%	±%
CPI(M)	K. Radhakrishnan	83,415	54.41	▲9.60
INC	C. C. Sreekumar	44,015	28.71	▼9.36
BJP	Shajumon Vattekkad	24,045	15.68	▼0.09
SDPI	Chandran Thiyyath	1,120	0.73	▼0.01
NOTA	None of the above	720	0.47	−
Margin of victory		39,400	25.70	
Turnout		1,53,315	77.40	
CPI(M) hold		Swing	▲9.60	

=== 2016 ===
There were 1,90,919 registered voters in the constituency for the 2016 election.

2016 Kerala Legislative Assembly election: Chelakkara
Party	Candidate	Votes	%	±%
CPI(M)	U. R. Pradeep	67,771	44.81	▼10.61
INC	Thulasi	57,571	38.07	▲1.21
BJP	Shajumon P. P.	23,845	15.77	▲10.46
SDPI	A. Subramanian	1,116	0.74	▼0.93
NOTA	None of the above	922	0.61	−
Margin of victory		10,200	6.74	
Turnout		1,51,225	79.21	
CPI(M) hold		Swing	▼10.61	

=== 2011 ===
There were 1,73,746 registered voters in the constituency for the 2011 election.

2011 Kerala Legislative Assembly election: Chelakkara
Party	Candidate	Votes	%	±%
CPI(M)	K. Radhakrishnan	73,683	55.42	
INC	K. B. Sasikumar	49,007	36.86	
BJP	V. A. Krishnakmaran	7,056	5.31	
SDPI	A. Subramanian	2,224	1.67	
BSP	Suresh Babu	972	0.73	
Margin of victory		24,676	18.56	
Turnout		1,32,942	76.52	
CPI(M) hold		Swing		

== See also ==
- Chelakkara
- Thrissur district
- List of constituencies of the Kerala Legislative Assembly
