= Alathur =

- Town
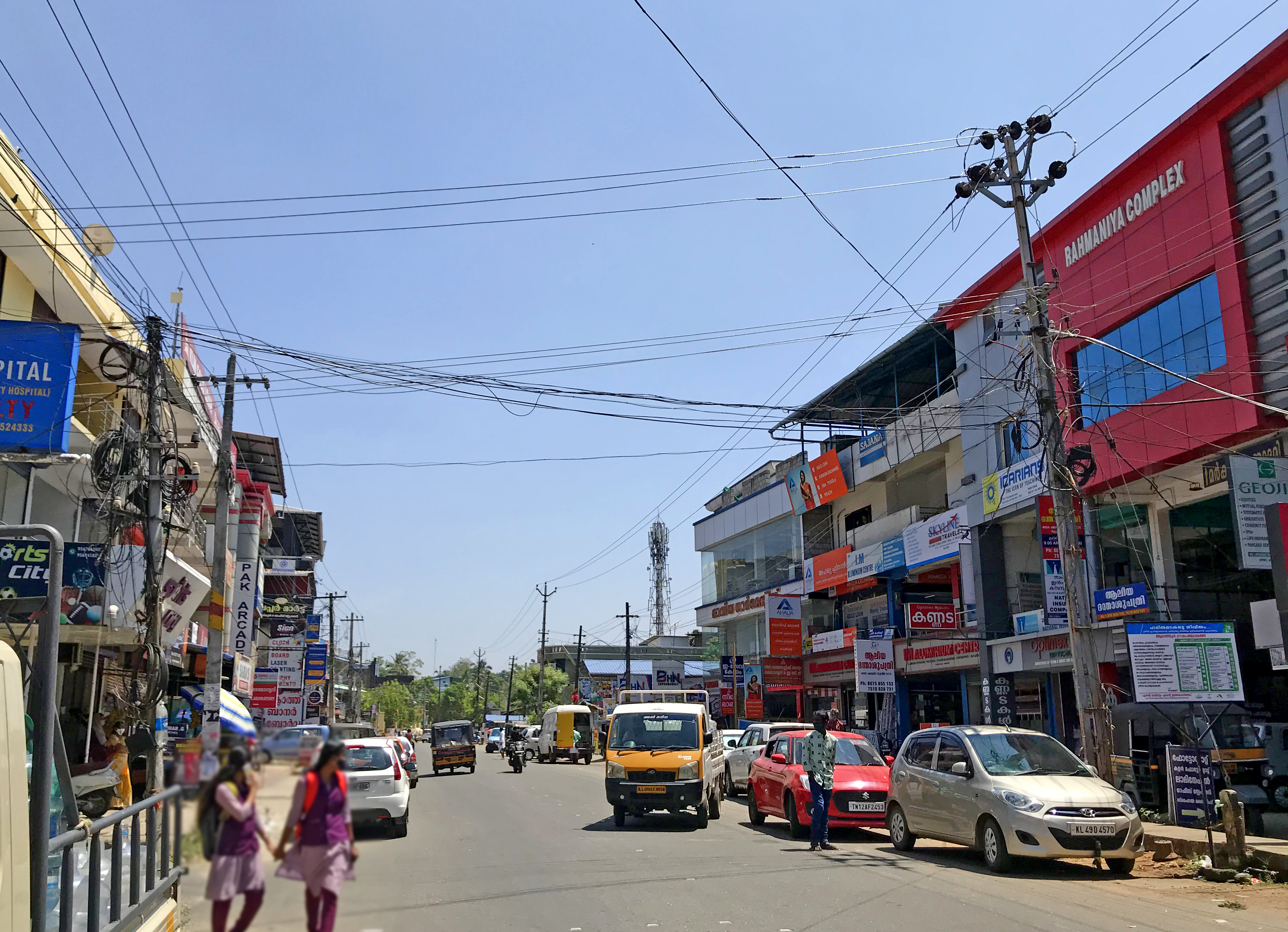
- Alathur

- Location in Kerala, India Alathur (India)
- Coordinates: 10°38′53″N 76°32′18″E
- Country: India
- State: Kerala
- District: Palakkad

Government
  - Type: Panchayati Raj (India)
  - Body: Alathur Panchayat

Area
  - Total: 19.62 km^{2} (7.58 sq mi)

Population (2011)
  - Total: 26,720
  - Density: 1,361.88/km^{2} (3,527.3/sq mi)

Languages
  - Official: Malayalam, English
- Time zone: UTC+5:30 (IST)
- PIN: 678541
- Telephone code: 04922
- Vehicle registration: KL-49
- Nearest city: Palakkad
- Parliament constituency: Alathur
- Assembly constituency: Alathur

Alathur is a town, taluk and gram panchayat in Palakkad District, Kerala, India. It is the administrative headquarters of the Alathur Taluk and is situated about 24 km from the district headquarters Palakkad through National Highway 544.Gayathripuzha River , one of the tributary of Bharathapuzha, flows through Alathur. Alathur is one among the 20 Parliamentary Constituencies in Kerala. A Mini Civil Station is also located here which provides government related services.

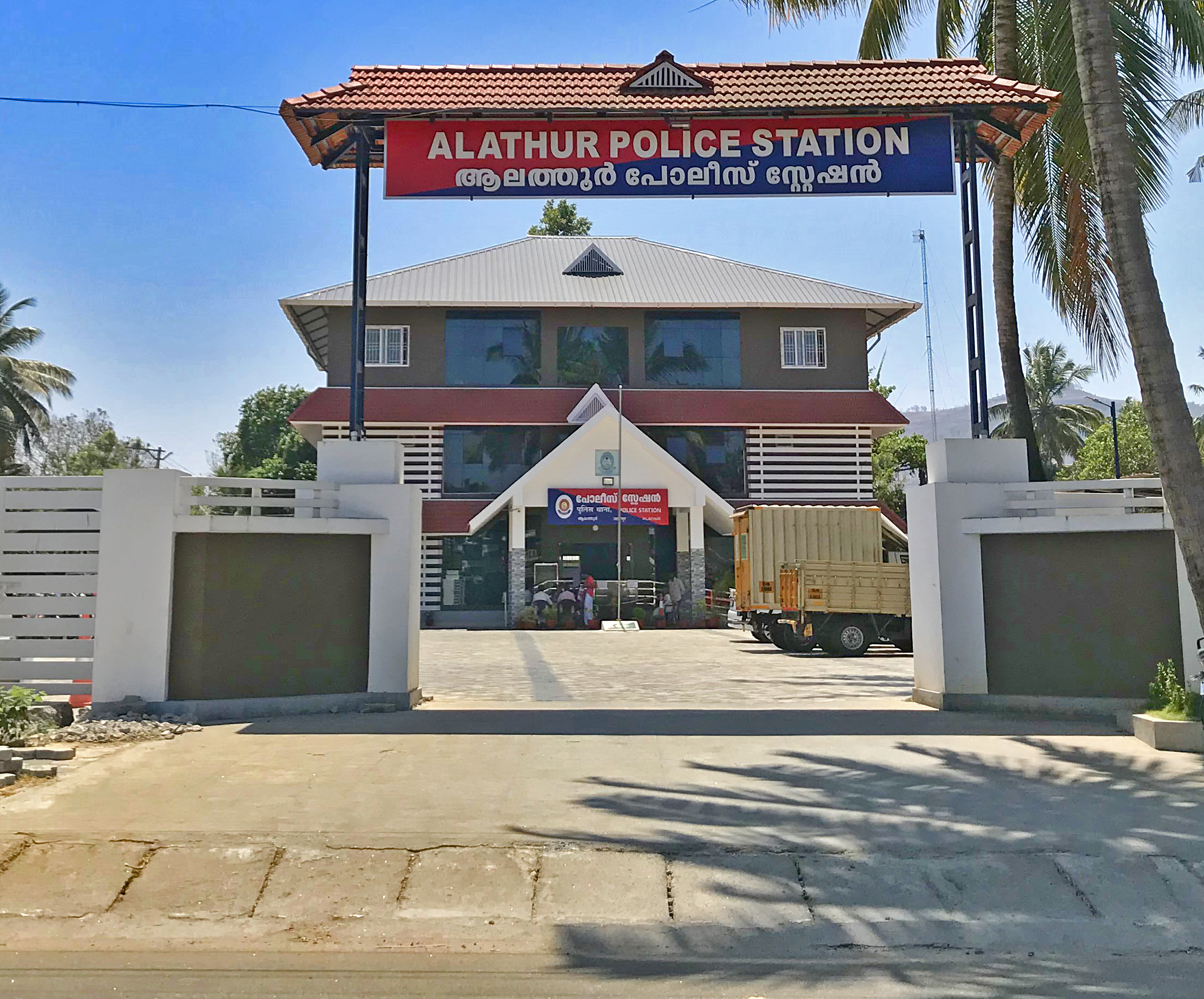
Alathur Police Station

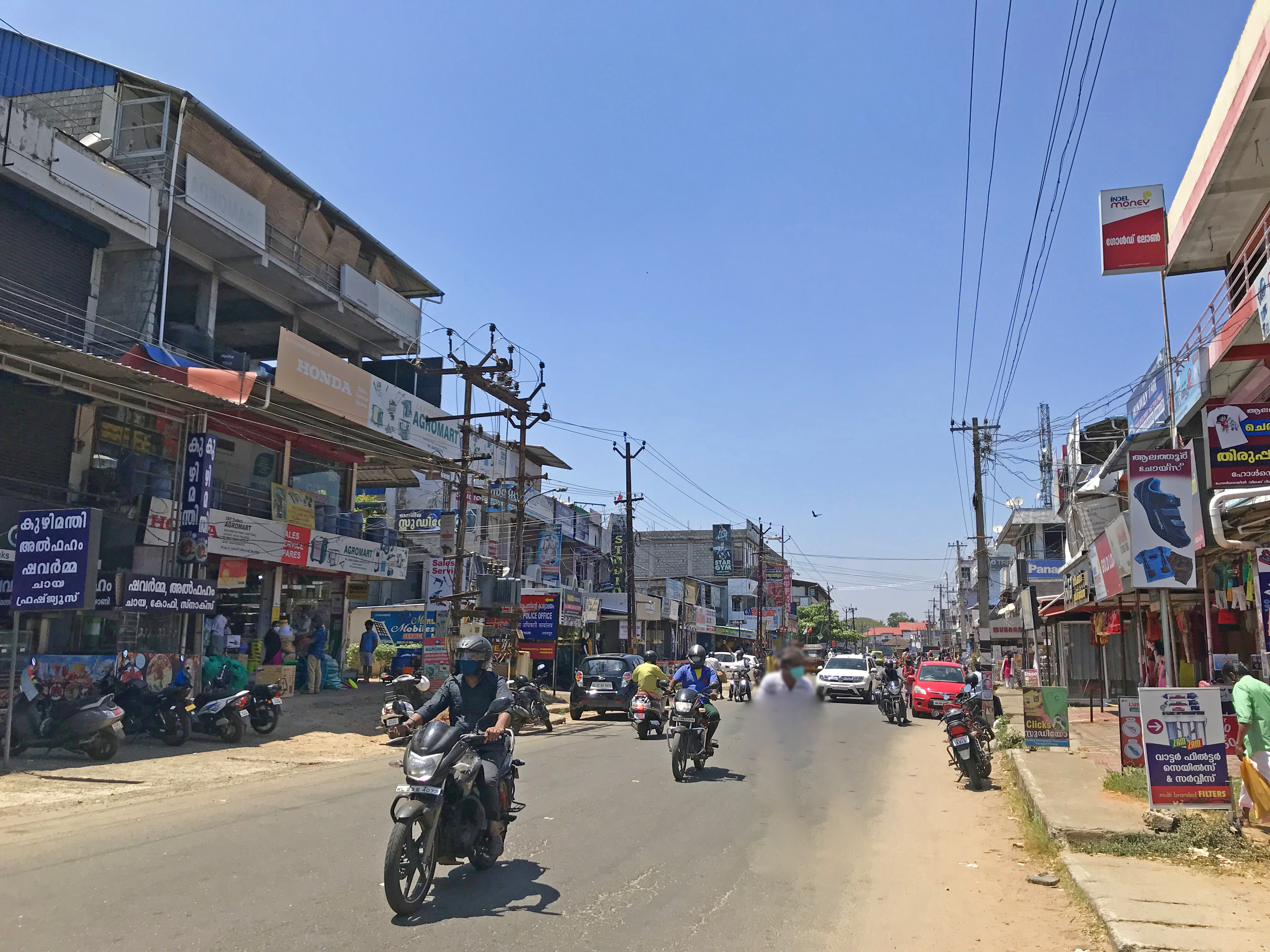
Alathur town court road

== Economy ==
The main occupation in this area is agriculture. Rubber is grown on hilly land and rice paddies are located on the plains. Coconut, Ginger, banana, pumpkin, bitter gourd and eggplant are also grown.

There is very little industry in Alathur Taluk. Alathur town was once well known for its beedi cottage industry but production has declined due to anti-smoking efforts. Agarbatti is also produced by the cottage industry. Recently some industrial development such as steel smelting has arisen near Manjalur in Erimayur Panchayat. Historically there were a number of rice mills in the area but their numbers have declined.

== Demographics ==
As of 2011 Census, Alathur had a population of 26,720 with 12,808 males and 13,912 females. Alathur census town has an area of 19.62 km^{2} (7.58 sq mi) with 6,096 families residing in it. 11% of the population was under 6 years of age. Alathur had an average literacy of 89.95% higher than the national average of 74.04% and lower than state average of 94.00%; male literacy was 95.14% and female literacy was 85.27%.

== Educational institutions ==
There are a number of schools up to the higher secondary level within Alathur Taluk. There are two colleges for arts and science and one engineering college.

- Sree Narayana College, Alathur
- BSS B.Ed College, Alathur

A S Mohammed Kutty Sahib Memorial High Secondary School (A S M M H S S) is a public institution that has been operating in the area for over a century. The school also houses a very old Gandhiji statue which has become a landmark.

The school was established by the Nellikkalidam Family (Swaroopm), and the School used to be called N.E. High School (NEHS), until being bought by Mr. Mohammad Kutty; later since the land reforms act, the swaroopam suffered financially and the school was bought by Mr. Mohammad Kutty, who has since then been running a Beedi rolling business

BSS Gurukulam Higher Secondary School, is also located here.

Located Taluk Hospital at Alathur town, Healthcare Professional Institution in Alathur is established by Crescent Medical Centre Ltd. The Crescent School of Nursing was started in 2001 and Crescent College of Nursing was started in 2005. The Crescent Nursing Institution runs General Nursing & Midwifery (GNM) Diploma course and BSc. Nursing Degree Course.

== Transportation ==
The National Highway No.544 passes through the entire length of Alathur Taluk. Because of this, the region is well connected by road to all parts of Kerala including the state capital. A number of private and government buses ply on this road between Thrissur and Palakkad.

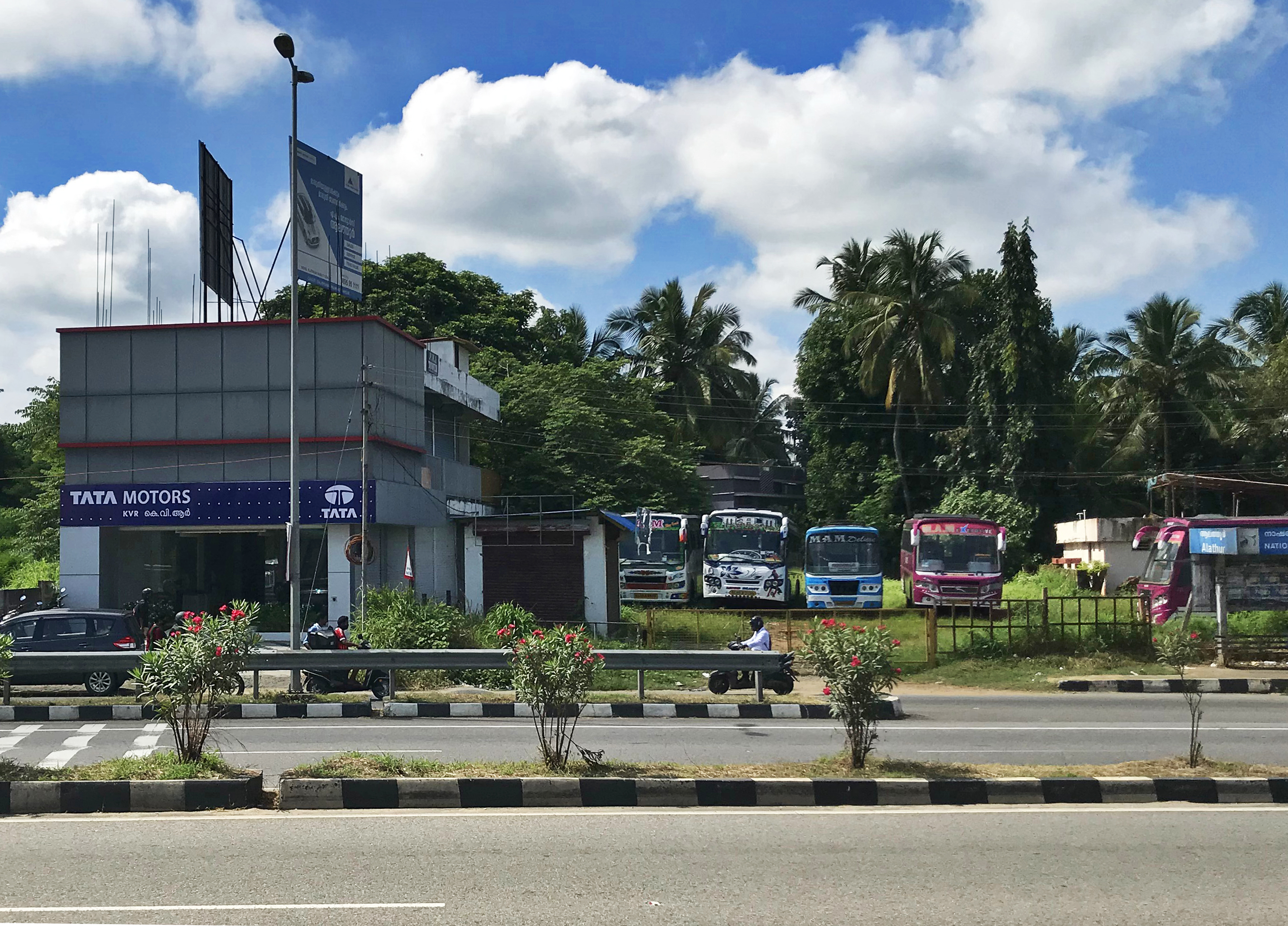
National Highway 544, Alathur

Alathur does not have a railway connection due to the presence of the mountainous terrain at Kuthiran towards Trissur. A recent government decision to revive an old plan to construct the Kollengode–Trissur railway line may come as a blessing to Alathur.

== Healthcare ==
Alathur town has a Government-run Community Health Centre. The major private healthcare facility Crescent Hospital, which was established in 1997 and is a multi-specialty hospital with all basic medical departments and trauma care. That hospital also has psychiatric and geriatric facilities.

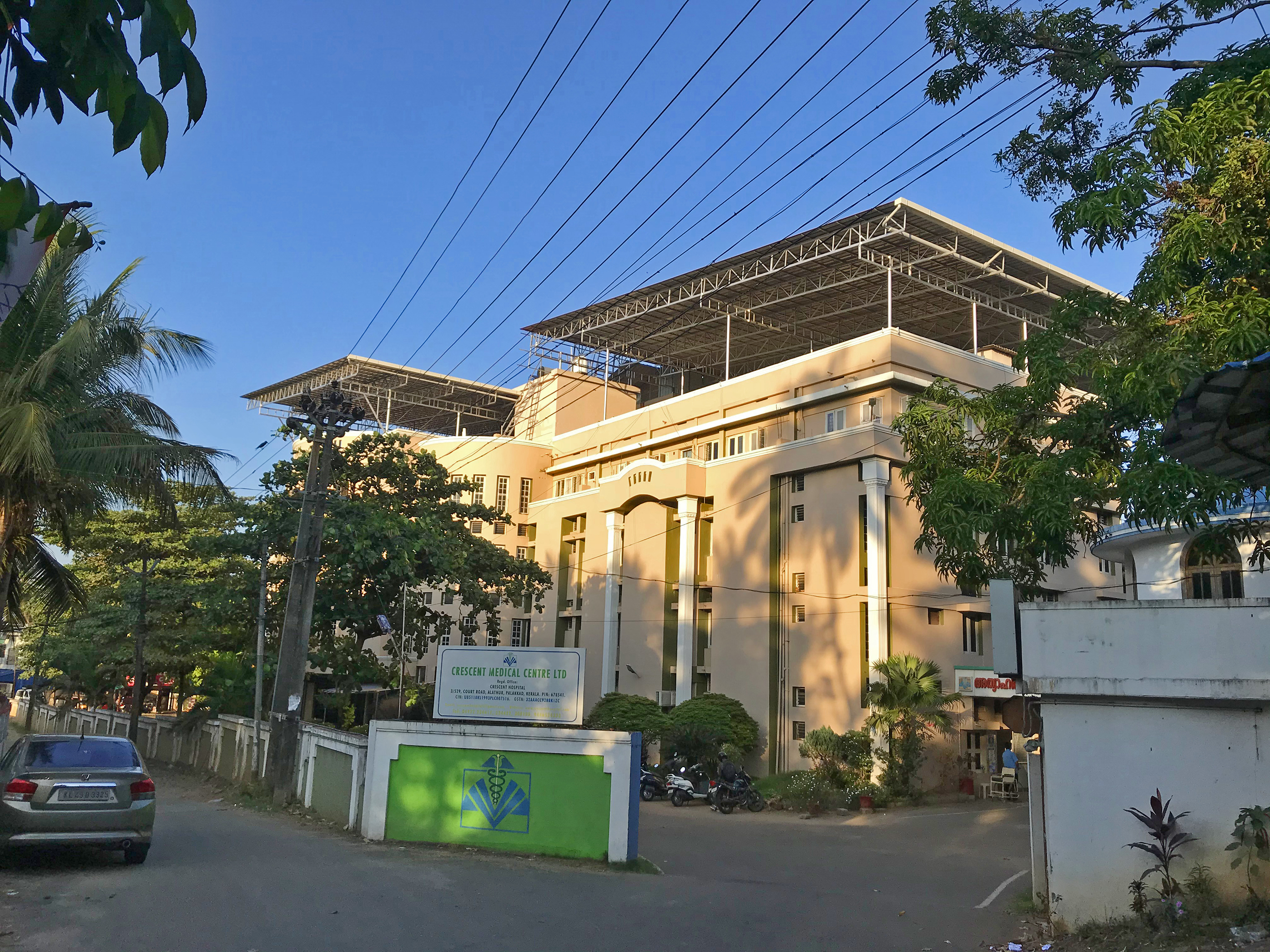
Crescent Hospital Alathur

== Panchayats in Alathur Taluk ==
Alathur is one of the six Taluks of Palakkad district.

- Alathur
- Erimayur
- Kannambra
- Kavasseri
- Kizhakkancheri
- Kottayi
- Kuthanur
- Kuzhalmannam
- Mathur
- Melarcode
- Peringottukurissi
- Puthucode
- Tarur
- Thenkurissi
- Vadakkencherry
- Vandazhy (gram panchayat)

== Politics ==
The Alathur assembly constituency is part of the Alathur Lok Sabha constituency.

Alathur assembly constituency (A.C.) elects one representative to the Kerala state assembly (Vidhan Sabha). It has approximately 150,000 (1.5 lakh) registered voters. Elected members have most often been from the Communist Party of India (Marxist).
