= K. Radhakrishnan (politician) =

Indian politician (born 1964)

Kochunni Radhakrishnan
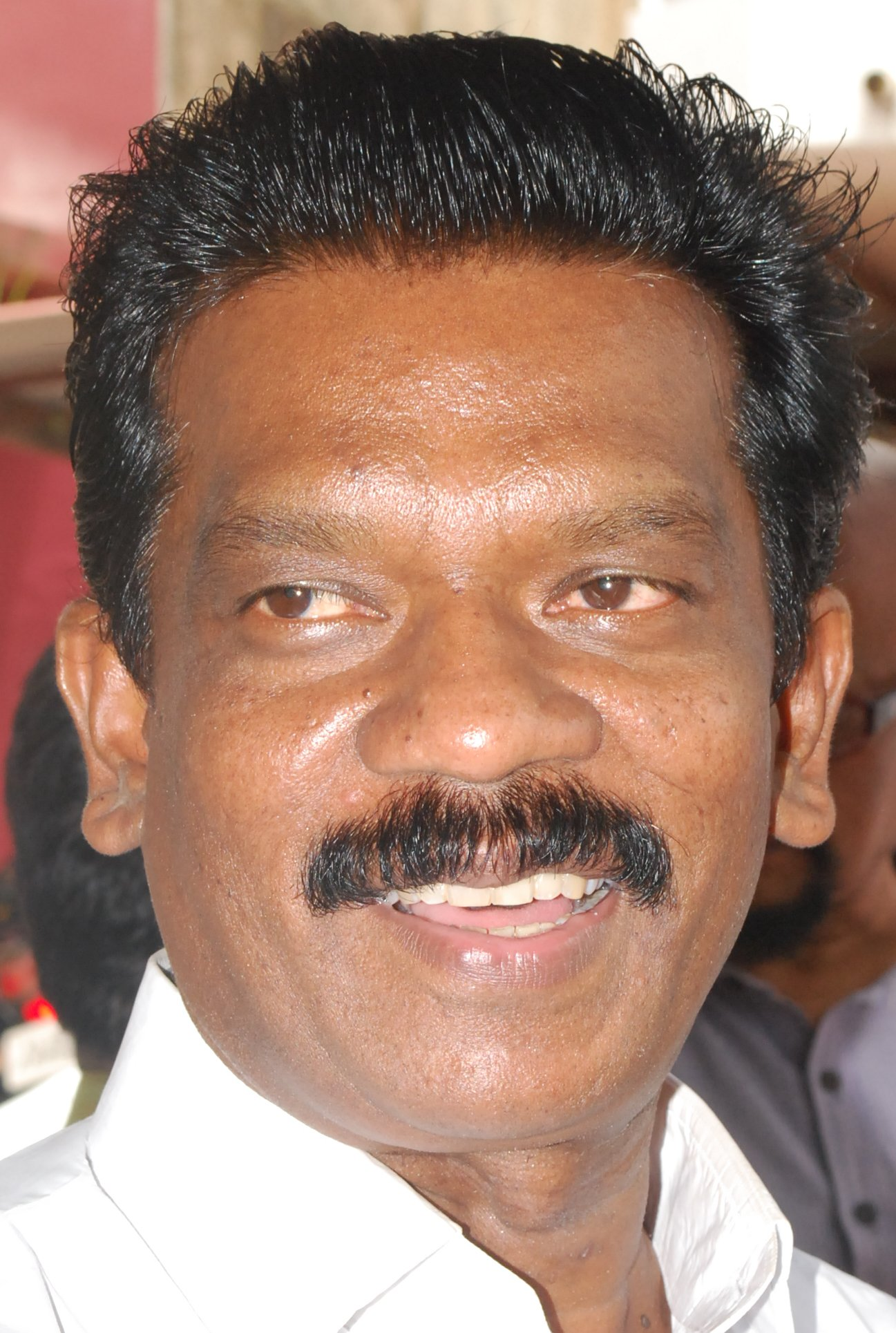
- Official portrait, 2019

Member of Parliament, Lok Sabha
- Incumbent
- Assumed office 4 June 2024
- Preceded by: Ramya Haridas
- Constituency: Alathur, Kerala

Minister of Devaswams, Welfare of Scheduled Caste & Scheduled Tribes and Parliamentary Affairs of Kerala
- In office 20 May 2021 – 17 June 2024
- Chief Minister: Pinarayi Vijayan
- Preceded by: A. K. Balan (SC/ST Development and Parliamentary Affairs); Kadakampally Surendran (Devaswam)
- Succeeded by: V. N. Vasavan (Devaswam) O. R. Kelu (SC/ST Development) M. B. Rajesh (Parliamentary Affairs)

Speaker of Kerala Legislative Assembly
- In office 3 June 2006 – 13 May 2011
- Preceded by: Therambil Ramakrishnan
- Succeeded by: G. Karthikeyan

Member of Kerala Legislative Assembly
- In office 2 May 2021 – 4 June 2024
- Preceded by: U. R. Pradeep
- Succeeded by: U. R. Pradeep
- Constituency: Chelakkara
- In office 12 May 1996 – 2 June 2016
- Preceded by: M. P. Thami
- Succeeded by: U. R. Pradeep
- Constituency: Chelakkara

Minister of Welfare of Backward & Scheduled Communities and Youth Affairs of Kerala
- In office 1996–2001
- Chief Minister: E. K. Nayanar

Personal details
- Born: 24 May 1964 (age 62) Pullikkanam Vagamon, Kerala, India (present day Idukki)
- Party: Communist Party of India (Marxist)

Kochunni Radhakrishnan (born 24 May 1964) is an Indian politician who is the CPI(M) Parliamentary Party Leader in 18th Lok Sabha and Member of the Lok Sabha for Alathur since 2024. A veteran leader of the Communist Party of India (Marxist), Radhakrishnan has previously served as a State Minister of Kerala from 2021 to 2024, and from 1996 to 2001.

He also served as Speaker of the Kerala Legislative Assembly from 2006 to 2011. Radhakrishnan served in the Kerala Legislative Assembly for five terms, representing Chelakkara from 1996 to 2016 and again from 2021 to 2024.

He is CPI(M) Central Committee member and the All India President of Dalit Shoshan Mukti Manch (DSMM).

== Early life ==
He was born on 24 May 1964 in Pullikkanam, Vagamon, Idukki.

== Political life ==
He was an active member in SFI, holding posts like unit secretary of Sree Kerala Varma College, Chelakkara area secretary, and member of Thrissur district secretariat as an SFI leader. He also worked as Chelakkara Block Committee secretary and state committee member of DYFI, and he is now CPI(M) central committee member. Radhakrishnan was elected to the Thrissur District Council in 1991 from the Vallathol Nagar division. He was elected to the Kerala Assembly in 1996, 2001, 2006, 2011 and 2021. He served as Minister for the Welfare of Backward and Scheduled Communities and Youth Affairs from 1996 to 2001. He was Opposition Chief Whip from 2001 to 2006. He was District Secretary of CPI(M), Thrissur from 2016 to 2018. He was also District Convenor of Left Democratic Front, Thrissur from 2013 to 2018. He was the founder State President of the CPI(M) Kerala-controlled Pattikajathi Kshema Samithi (Eng. Scheduled Castes Welfare Committee), briefly known as "PKS", which is a welfare committee for scheduled castes of Kerala. He also served as the State President of Farm Workers Union (CITU), Kerala Clay Pottery Workers Union. He was elected to CPI(M) Central committee on 22nd Party Congress held on 2018. He was elected to Loksabha from Alathur with a margin of 20,111 votes in 2024 Indian general election.

== Electoral record ==
Election	Year	Party	Constituency	Result	Margin
Kerala Legislative Assembly	1996	CPI(M)	Chelakkara	Won	2,323
Kerala Legislative Assembly	2001	CPI(M)	Chelakkara	Won	1,475
Kerala Legislative Assembly	2006	CPI(M)	Chelakkara	Won	14,629
Kerala Legislative Assembly	2011	CPI(M)	Chelakkara	Won	24,676
Kerala Legislative Assembly	2021	CPI(M)	Chelakkara	Won	39,400
Loksabha	2024	CPI(M)	Alathur	Won	20,111

== Positions held ==
• SFI Unit Secretary,Sree kerala varma college Thrissur

• DYFI State committee member

• Member, District Council, Thrissur from Vallathol Nagar Division

• Member of Legislative Assembly, Chelakkara Assembly constituency 1996, 2001, 2006, 2011, 2021

• Minister for Welfare of Scheduled Castes &Tribes, Backward classes, Youth Affairs Nayanar Ministry 1996 - 2001

• Member District Committee, CPI(M) Thrissur

• Opposition Chief Whip, Kerala Legislative Assembly 2001-06

• Member CPI(M) District Secretariat, Thrissur

• Member CPI(M) State committee

• Speaker, Kerala Legislative Assembly 2006-11

• District Secretary CPI(M) Thrissur 2016 -18

• District Convenor, LDF Thrissur 2012-18

• State President, Pattikajathi Kshema Samithi (PKS)

• State President Farm Workers Union (CITU)

• State President, Kerala Clay Pottery Workers Union

• Central Committee member CPI(M) 2018 onwards

• All India President, Dalit Shoshan Mukti Manch (DSMM)

• Minister for Devaswoms, Welfare Scheduled Castes & Tribes, Backward Classes, Parliamentary Affairs 2021-2024 Pinarayi Vijayan Ministry

• Member of Parliament, Alathur Loksabha

• Parliamentary Party Leader of CPI(M), Lok Sabha

• Member,Joint Parliamentary Committee (JPC) on 'One Nation One Election' Bill- The Constitution (One Hundred and Twenty-Ninth Amendment) Bill, 2024.
