= Rishinaradamangalam =

Rishinaradamangalam R. Mangalam
- Village
- Location in Kerala, India Rishinaradamangalam (India)
- Coordinates: 10°37′0″N 76°27′50″E
- Country: India
- State: Kerala
- District: Palakkad
- Gram panchayat: Kannambra

Languages
  - Official: Malayalam, English
- Time zone: UTC+5:30 (IST)
- PIN: 678687
- Telephone code: 04922
- Vehicle registration: KL-09
- Nearest city: Vadakkencherry

Rishinaradamangalam is a small village near Kannambra in Alathur taluk of Palakkad district in Kerala State, India.

It has one of the few temples dedicated to Narasimha Murthy. Rishinaradamangalam is one of the two villages which celebrate Kannambra Vela.

It is situated 5 km from Vadakkencherry NH 47 (Trissur - Palakkad Route).
