= Alathur Lok Sabha constituency =

Lok Sabha Constituency in Kerala

Coordinates: 10.6°N 76.5°E

Alathur KL-9
- Lok Sabha constituency
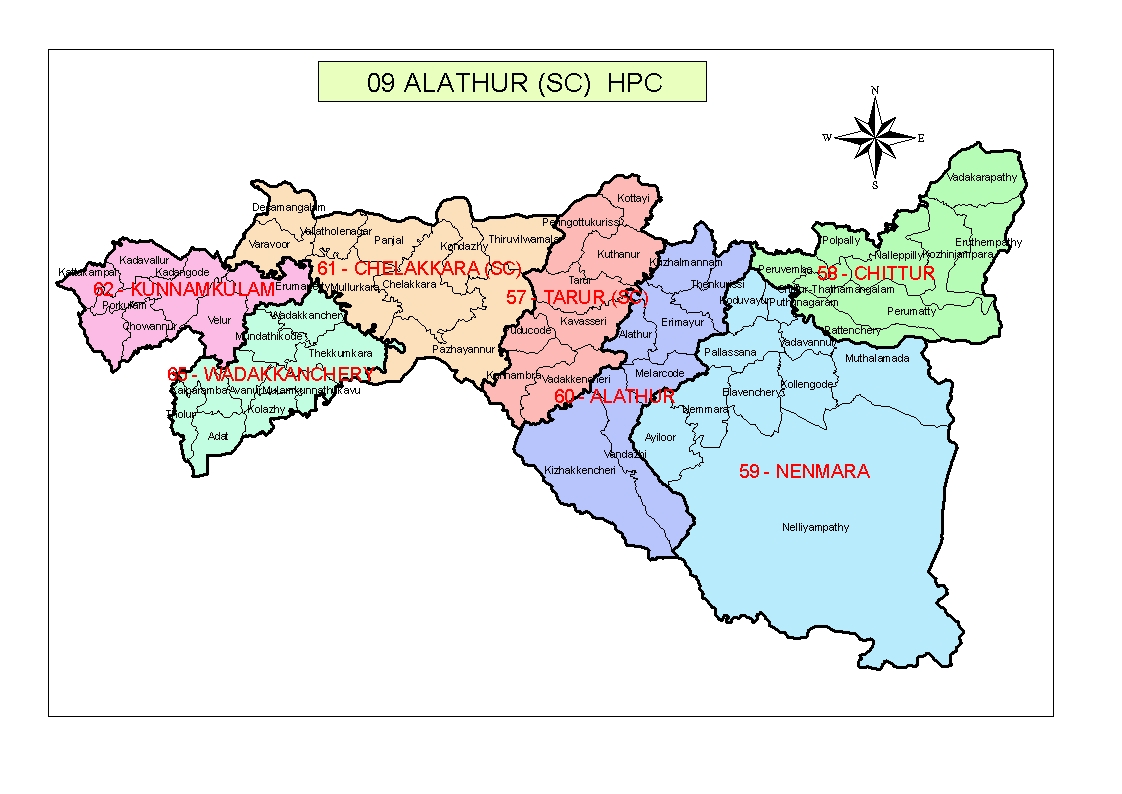
- Alathur Lok Sabha constituency

Constituency details
- Country: India
- Region: South India
- State: Kerala
- Assembly constituencies: Tarur; Chittur; Nenmara; Alathur; Chelakkara; Kunnamkulam; Wadakkanchery
- Established: 2009
- Total electors: 12,64,471 (2019)
- Reservation: SC

Member of Parliament
- 18th Lok Sabha
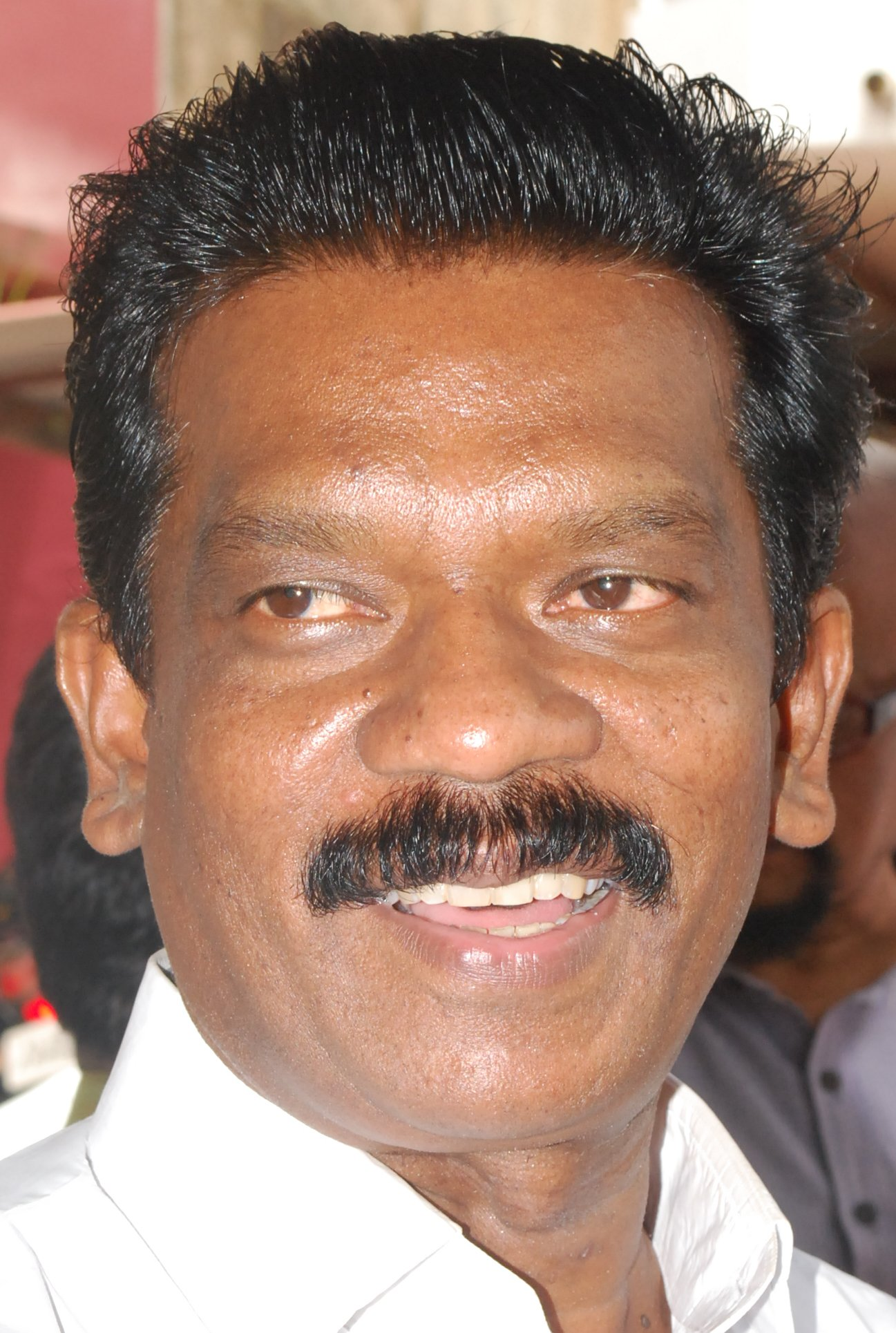
- Incumbent K Radhakrishnan
- Party: CPI(M)
- Alliance: LDF
- Elected year: 2024
- Preceded by: Ramya Haridas

Alathur is one of the 20 Lok Sabha (parliamentary) constituencies in Kerala state in southern India.This constituency came into existence in 2008, following the implementation of delimitation of parliamentary constituencies based on the recommendations of the Delimitation Commission of India constituted in 2002.

== Assembly segments ==
Alathur Lok Sabha constituency comprises the following seven legislative assembly segments:

No	Name	District	Member	Party	2024 Lead
57	Tarur (SC)	Palakkad	P. P. Sumod	CPI(M)	CPI(M)
58	Chittur	Palakkad	Sumesh Achuthan	INC	INC
59	Nenmara	Palakkad	K. Preman	CPI(M)	INC
60	Alathur	Palakkad	K. D. Prasenan	CPI(M)	CPI(M)
61	Chelakkara (SC)	Thrissur	U. R. Pradeep	CPI(M)	CPI(M)
62	Kunnamkulam	Thrissur	A. C. Moideen	CPI(M)	CPI(M)
65	Wadakkanchery	Thrissur	Xavier Chittilappilly	CPI(M)	INC

Chelakkara, Wadakkancherry and Kunnamkulam segments were earlier in the erstwhile Ottapalam Lok Sabha constituency.

== Members of Parliament ==
Election	Lok Sabha	Member	Party
2009	15th	P. K. Biju	CPI(M)
2014	16th	P. K. Biju	CPI(M)
2019	17th	Ramya Haridas	INC
2024	18th	K Radhakrishnan	CPI(M)

== Election results ==
=== General Elections 2029 ===
2029 Indian general election: Alathur
Party	Candidate	Votes	%	±%
INC				
CPI(M)				
NDA				
NOTA	None of the above			
Margin of victory				
Turnout				
		Swing		

=== General Election 2024 ===
2024 Indian general election: Alathur
Party	Candidate	Votes	%	±%
CPI(M)	K. Radhakrishnan	403,447	40.66	▲3.86
INC	Ramya Haridas	3,83,336	38.63	▼13.77
BJP	T. N. Sarassu	1,88,230	18.97	▲10.97
NOTA	None of the above	12,033	1.21	▲0.45
Majority		20,111	2.03	▼13.56
Turnout		9,93,759	74.15	▼6.32
CPI(M) gain from INC		Swing		

=== Legislative Assembly Constituency wise Results 2024 ===
No.	Constituency	Winner	Party	Votes	Runner-up	Party	Votes	Margin
57	Tarur	K. Radhakrishnan	CPI(M)	52,082	Ramya Haridas	INC	46,890	5,192
58	Chittur	Ramya Haridas	INC	56,844	K. Radhakrishnan	CPI(M)	55,372	-1,472
59	Nenmara	Ramya Haridas	INC	56,768	K. Radhakrishnan	CPI(M)	55,451	-1,317
60	Alathur	K. Radhakrishnan	CPI(M)	55,692	Ramya Haridas	INC	46,894	8,798
61	Chelakkara	K. Radhakrishnan	CPI(M)	60,368	Ramya Haridas	INC	55,195	5,173
62	Kunnamkulam	K. Radhakrishnan	CPI(M)	58,549	Ramya Haridas	INC	54,722	3,827
63	Wadakkanchery	Ramya Haridas	INC	61,918	K. Radhakrishnan	CPI(M)	61,304	-614

=== General election 2019 ===
2019 Indian general election: Alathur
Party	Candidate	Votes	%	±%
INC	Ramya Haridas	533,815	52.4	▲12.07
CPI(M)	P K Biju	3,74,847	36.8	▼7.54
BDJS	T.V. Babu	89,837	8.82	▼1.65
BSP	Dr. Jayan.C.Kuthannur	5,505	0.54	▲0.54
Independent	Krishnankutty Kunissery	2716	0.27	N/A
Independent	Pratheep Kumar P.K	4301	0.42	N/A
NOTA	None of the above	7722	0.76	▼01.55
Margin of victory		1,58,968	15.59	
Turnout		10,19,376	80.47	
INC gain from CPI(M)		Swing		

=== Legislative Assembly Constituency wise Results 2019 ===
No.	Constituency	Winner	Party	Votes	Runner-up	Party	Votes	Margin
57	Tarur	Ramya Haridas	INC	72,441	P.K. Biju	CPI (M)	47,602	24,839
58	Chittur	Ramya Haridas	INC	79,423	P.K. Biju	CPI (M)	55,956	23,467
59	Nenmara	Ramya Haridas	INC	82,539	P.K. Biju	CPI (M)	52,318	30,221
60	Alathur	Ramya Haridas	INC	73,120	P.K. Biju	CPI (M)	50,407	22,713
61	Chelakkara	Ramya Haridas	INC	76,034	P.K. Biju	CPI (M)	52,339	23,695
62	Kunnamkulam	Ramya Haridas	INC	69,908	P.K. Biju	CPI (M)	55,586	14,322
63	Wadakkanchery	Ramya Haridas	INC	79,028	P.K. Biju	CPI (M)	59,488	19,540

=== 2014 ===
2014 Indian general election: Alathur
Party	Candidate	Votes	%	±%
CPI(M)	P.K. Biju	411,808	44.34	▼2.41
INC	Sheeba	3,74,496	40.33	▼4.31
BJP	Shaju Mon Vattekad	87,803	9.45	▲2.93
NOTA	None of the above	21,417	2.31	
Margin of victory		37,312	4.02	▲1.49
Turnout		9,27,228	76.42	
CPI(M) hold		Swing		

=== 2009 ===
2009 Indian general election: Alathur
Party	Candidate	Votes	%	±%
CPI(M)	P K Biju	387,352	46.84	
INC	N K Sudheer	3,66,392	44.31	
BJP	M Bindu	53,890	6.52	
Margin of victory		20,960	2.53	
Turnout		8,26,891	74.98	
CPI(M) win (new seat)				

== See also ==
- Palakkad district
- Thrissur district
- Ottapalam (Lok Sabha constituency)
- Indian general election, 2014 (Kerala)
