= Vilayannur =

- village
- Country: India
- State: Kerala
- District: Palakkad

Languages
  - Official: Malayalam, English
- Time zone: UTC+5:30 (IST)
- Vehicle registration: KL-

Vilayannur is a village near Thenkurussi, in the Palakkad district of Kerala, India.
