= M. Chandran =

M. Chandran may refer to:

- M. Chandran (politician)
- M. Chandran (footballer)
