= V. Chenthamarakshan =

Indian politician

Member of Kerala Legislative Assembly
- In office 2011–2016
- Preceded by: constituency established
- Succeeded by: K. Babu
- Constituency: Nemmara
- In office 2006–2011
- Preceded by: K. A. Chandran
- Succeeded by: constituency abolished Himself as MLA of Nemmara Assembly Constitution
- Constituency: Kollengode
- In office 2001–2006
- Preceded by: C. K. Rajendran
- Succeeded by: M. Chandran
- Constituency: Alathur

Personal details
- Born: 27 March 1960 (age 66) Kavassery
- Party: Communist Party of India (Marxist)
- Spouse: Geetha K.

Vellandy Chenthamarakshan is an Indian politician who was the member of 13th Kerala Legislative Assembly. He belongs to Communist Party of India (Marxist) and represented Nemmara constituency in that term. He was previously elected to Kerala Legislative Assembly in 2001 and 2006 from the erstwhile Kollengode constituency.

== Political life ==
He started his political life as the member of Students Federation of India. He was the president and secretary of S.F.I in Palakkad district. He served as the secretary of D.Y.F.I, Palakkad district. He is now a member of CPI (M) District Committee, Palakkad.

== Personal life ==
He was born on 27 March 1960 at Kavassery. He is the son of A.V. Vellandy and Janaky. He has a bachelor's degree in arts. He is married to Geetha K.
