= Chelakkara =

- Town
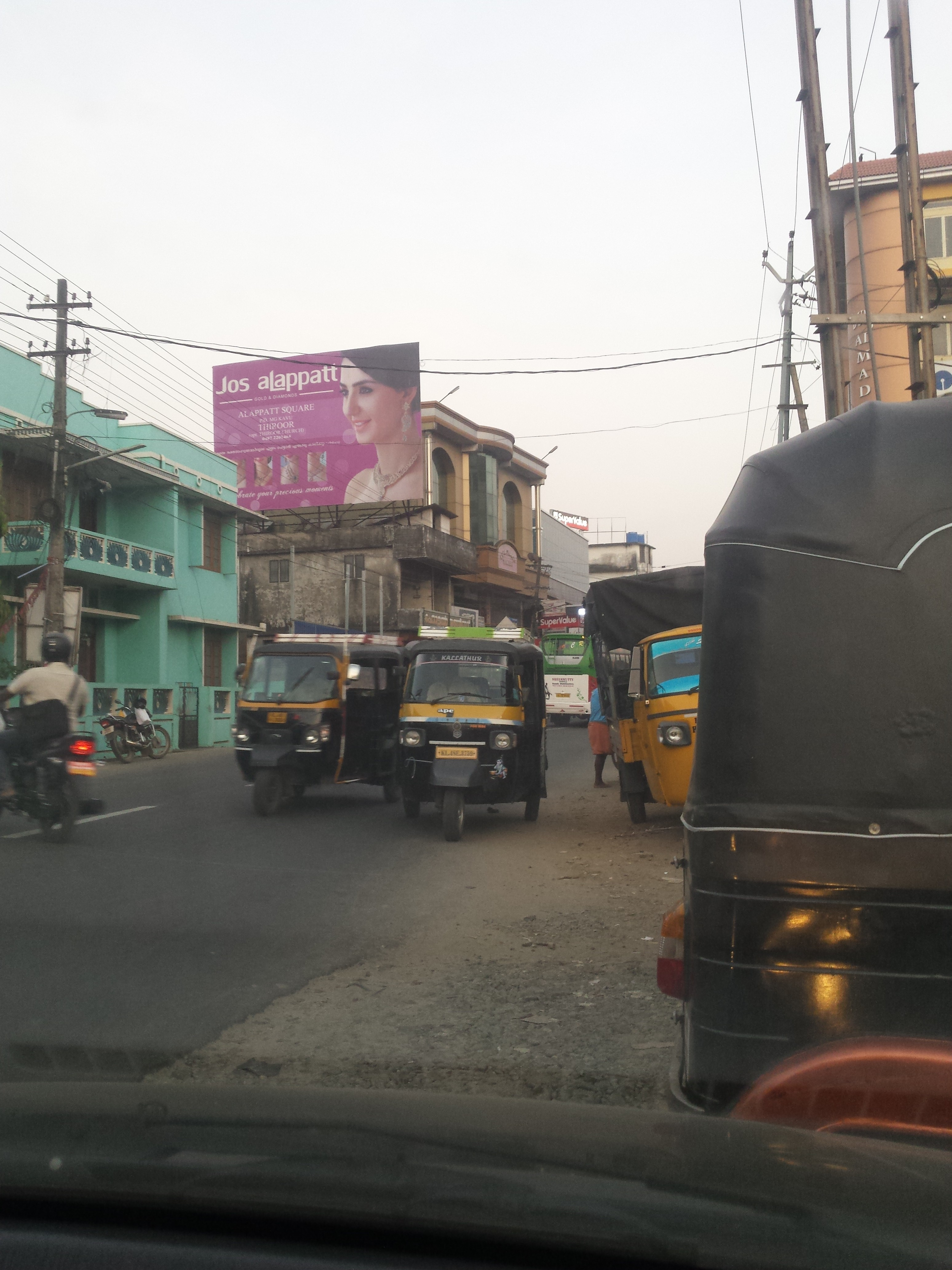

- Location in Kerala, India
- Coordinates: 10.70°N 76.35°E
- Country: India
- State: Kerala
- District: Thrissur

Government
  - Body: Chelakkara Grama Panchayath
- Elevation: 66 m (217 ft)

Languages
  - Official: Malayalam, English
- Time zone: UTC+5:30 (IST)
- Telephone code: 04884
- Vehicle registration: KL-48
- Nearest cities: Thrissur, Wadakanchery, Ottapalam, Shornur
- Lok Sabha constituency: Alathur

Chelakkara is a large town in the Thrissur district of Kerala.

== Geography ==
Chelakkara is located at 10.70°N 76.35°E. It has an average elevation of 6 m (20 ft).

== Politics ==
Chelakkara assembly constituency (SC) is part of Alathur. It is also the constituency of ex-Speaker of Kerala Assembly and former Minister for Welfare of Scheduled Castes, Scheduled Tribes and Backward Classes, Devaswoms, Parliamentary Affairs of Kerala K. Radhakrishnan.
