= T. M. Sasi =

Indian politician

T. M. Sasi (born 1980) is an Indian politician from Kerala. He is a Member of the Legislative Assembly from Alathur Assembly in Palakkad district constituency representing the Communist Party of India (Marxist).

== Early life ==
Sasi is from Mudappallur, Thekkumnjeri, Palakkad, Kerala. He is the son of Devu. He studied BA in sociology in 2013 at a college affiliated with Annamalai University. He runs his own business and declared assets worth Rs.1 crore in his affidavit to the Election Commission of India.

== Career ==
Sasi first became an MLA winning the 2026 Kerala Legislative Assembly election from Alathur Assembly constituency representing the Communist Party of India (Marxist). He polled 61,564 votes and defeated his nearest rival, K. M. Febin of the Indian National Congress, by a margin of 8,553 votes.

He served as Palakkad district panchayat president.
