= M. Chandran (politician) =

Indian politician (1946–2023)

- എം. ചന്ദ്രൻ

Member of the Kerala Legislative Assembly
- In office 2006–2016
- Constituency: Alathur

Personal details
- Born: 15 July 1946 Anakkara, Malabar District, Madras Presidency, British India
- Died: 1 May 2023 (aged 76) Ernakulam, Kerala, India
- Party: Communist Party of India (Marxist)
- Spouse: K. Komalavally

M. Chandran (Malayalam: എം. ചന്ദ്രൻ; 15 July 1946 – 1 May 2023) was an Indian politician from Palakkad, Kerala. He was a two-term Member of the Kerala Legislative Assembly representing the Alathur constituency.

== Political career ==
Chandran first entered politics when he was a student. He was a member of the Communist Party of India (Marxist), serving two terms in the Legislative Assembly representing Alathur between 2006 and 2016.

== Death ==
Chandran died in Ernakulam, Kerala, on 1 May 2023, at the age of 76.
