= Thenkurissi-I =

- village
- Country: India
- State: Kerala
- District: Palakkad

Population (2011)
  - Total: 14,429

Languages
  - Official: Malayalam, English
- Time zone: UTC+5:30 (IST)
- PIN: 678671
- Vehicle registration: KL49-

Thenkurissi-I is a village in Palakkad district in the state of Kerala, India. It falls under the Thenkurissi Panchayat of Alathur Taluk.

== Demographics ==
As of 2011 India census, Thenkurissi-I had a population of 14,429 with 7,048 males and 7,381 females.
