= U. R. Pradeep =

Indian politician

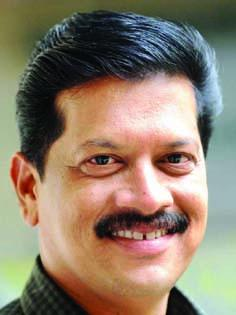

Member of the Kerala Legislative Assembly
- Incumbent
- Assumed office 23 November 2024
- Preceded by: K. Radhakrishnan
- Constituency: Chelakkara
- Majority: LDF

Member of the Kerala Legislative Assembly
- In office 2016–2021
- Preceded by: K. Radhakrishnan
- Succeeded by: K. Radhakrishnan
- Constituency: Chelakkara

Personal details
- Born: Pradeep Desamangalam
- Party: CPI(M)

U. R. Pradeep is an Indian politician from Kerala and is the current MLA for the Chelakkara Assembly constituency. He is a member of the Communist Party of India (Marxist).
