= Peringottukurissi-I =

Village in Kerala, India

- village
- Interactive map of Peringottukurissi-I
- Coordinates: 10°45′13.07″N 76°29′17.95″E
- Country: India
- State: Kerala
- District: Palakkad

Population (2011)
  - Total: 12,361

Languages
  - Official: Malayalam, English
- Time zone: UTC+5:30 (IST)
- PIN: 678574
- Vehicle registration: KL-

Peringottukurissi-I is a village in the Palakkad district, state of Kerala, India. It is among the villages administered by the Peringottukurissi gram panchayat.

== Demographics ==
As of 2011 India census, Peringottukurissi-I had a population of 12,361 with 5,954 males and 6,407 females.
