= Pullikkanam =

Village in Kerala, India

Pullikkanam is a hill station located near to vagamon tourist spot, Idukki district on the Kottayam-Idukki border in Kerala. Pullikkanam road is very famous because of its natural beauty and it is one of the famous movie shooting location for mollywood movies.

== General ==
It is located at an altitude of 1,100 meters above sea level. Vagamon is a small plantation township in Central Travancore, with lush green rolling hills. The Vagamon hill station consists of hills, valleys and waterfalls. Trekking, para-gliding and rock climbing are possible. It is a popular honeymoon location in Kerala Wagaman. Wagman is described as the Scotland of Asia. The city is famous for beautiful grasslands, tea plantations and green valleys. Taman Para, Murugan Hill and Kurishumala are the focal points here.

There are monsoons from June to September. Heavy rains during this season make travel difficult. Hence, the best time to visit Vagamon is during the dry seasons which are summer and winter.

Vagamon is about 100 km from Kochi and is therefore easily accessible by road. Local taxis, cabs and state tourism buses are also available to connect the hill station to the city. Vagamon is 43 km from Thodupuzha, 45 km from Kumali and 65 km from Kottayam.

Some places to see in Vagamon are

- Vagamon Pine Forest
- Marmala waterfall
- Thangal Para
- Barren Hills
- Vagamon Lake
- Mundakayam Ghat
- Vagamon Falls
- Ulupunni
- Kurisumala
- Vagamon Meadows
- Murugan Mala
- Yathravazhi.in

== Orchid garden ==
The 15-hectare (37-acre) garden of orchids, known as Kerala's first orchid garden, is in Kolahalamedu near Pullikkanam in Vagamon. This unique garden was opened to the public by mid-January 2014. The garden is in the land under Kerala Forest Development Corporation. The garden has some rare varieties of orchids that are found in the Western Ghats.

== Pullikkanam Tea Estate ==
The Pullikkanam Estate is owned by Kochi-based Cochin-Malabar Estates and Industries Limited. The company was set up 85 years ago and employs a number of people.
