= Peringottukurissi-II =

Village in Kerala, India

- village
- Peringottukurissi South
- Country: India
- State: Kerala
- District: Palakkad

Population (2011)
  - Total: 12,514

Languages
  - Official: Malayalam, English
- Time zone: UTC+5:30 (IST)
- PIN: 6XXXXX
- Vehicle registration: KL-

Peringottukurissi-II is a village in the Palakkad district, state of Kerala, India. It is among the villages administered by the Peringottukurissi gram panchayat.

== Demographics ==
As of 2011 India census, Peringottukurissi-II had a population of 12,514 with 6,042 males and 6,472 females.
