= Manjalur =

Manjalur Mannalur Mannalur
- village
- Location in Kerala, India Manjalur (India)
- Coordinates: 10.664697°N 76.611086°E
- Country: India
- State: Kerala
- District: Palakkad

Languages
  - Official: Malayalam, English
- Time zone: UTC+5:30 (IST)
- Vehicle registration: KL-
- Nearest city: Palakkad
- Climate: MODERATE (Köppen)

Manjalur is a village with a lot of tradition in the district of Palakkad in Kerala, India. It belongs to the Thenkurissy panchayat. Remarked by the tradition and the popular folk ritual kanyarkali. Manjalur Samudiri palace now demolished was the venue for holding Krishnattam kali. Manjalur was the only place in the world to hold this 10 day ballet of Krishnas life, with the exception of Guruvayur temple.

== Geography and religion ==
Land of some of the very old temples, the religious beliefs are pretty strong in this part of the area. The home goddess is 'Shree Chirathura Bhagavati' (ChirThura Muthi-ചിറത്തുറ മുത്തി). The other main temples in the locality are Manjalur Ayyappan Kavu (അയ്യപ്പൻ കാവ്) and Shree Durga Devi Kshethram (ദുർഗ്ഗാദേവി ക്ഷേത്രം). If people are to be believed, Nair/Menon Kings ruled this area and had a lot of wealth earlier. Another famous king of India plundered the wealth and the remains of the wealth are hidden in this area which is unexplored due to unknowing beliefs. The village is known for Mannalur Kummati (കുമ്മാട്ടി) and Mannalur Kanniyarkali (കണ്യാര്കളി), and the majority of natives/residents in the village are Hindus.

== Economics ==
The income is mainly from agriculture and the cultivation namely paddy and coconut. The well known dynasty or the ancient orthodox family with great ancestry are the Kanakku Veedu, Nallur Tharavad, Vaniam Parambathu Tharavadu, Payyoor Veedu, Thazhathu Veedu, Pallichirayath Ullattil Veedu and Puliakkode.

Late Shri K.P. Padmanabha Menon and Late Shri K.P. Bhaskara Menon were the important personalities who played a vital role in the development of Manjalur Desam (മഞ്ഞള്ലൂർ ദേശം). Late Shri K.P. Padmanabha Menon was also the founder and promoter of the Manjalur Co-operative bank as well as the first post master & developer. They also played a vital role in taking the 'Kanayarkali' team to represent the state of Kerala and took part in republic day parade.

== Attractions ==
The major attractions of the village, apart from the temples, are the great 'Mananchira' (മാനാഞ്ചിറ) a man-made freshwater pond built by the dynasty Samoothiri, the feudal ruler of Kozhikode in around the 14th century. The Samoothiri Raja had a Kovilakam in the village of Manjalur. Manjalur is the only place to have the Manachira Pond after Kozhikode. The pond, being the pride of the villagers, is still being used by the natives and is well preserved. 'Kota Mala'(കോട്ട മല) is another attraction which is a small hill which is home to numerous peacocks, wild boars, hares, and golden jackal. Kota Mala had the first ever windmill installed at the highest point in the district, the windmill having degenerated over time. Kotta Palla, is an area of green paddy fields. 'Sowparnika Garden', a flower garden in a coconut farm along with a wide variety of other cultivation like, vanilla, pepper, and a few medicinal plants and fruits, also hosts a place to witness the traditional way of coconut tapping and has a certified home-stay (Kalpataru) within (a plastic-free zone). Manjalur is the place where a Malayalam movies, Mazhayethum Munpe, was shot at a very old ancestral house 'Panikker Kunnath Veedu' alias (Vaniam Parambath Tharavadu) which is about 150 year old.
