= Kottayi-I =

- village
- Location in Kerala, India Kottayi-I (India)
- Coordinates: 10.764614°N 76.545203°E
- Country: India
- State: Kerala
- District: Palakkad

Population (2011)
  - Total: 12,654

Languages
  - Official: Malayalam, English
- Time zone: UTC+5:30 (IST)
- PIN: 6XXXXX
- Vehicle registration: KL-

Kottayi-I is a village in Palakkad district in the state of Kerala, India. Kottayi-I and Kottayi-II come under the Kottayi gram panchayat.

== Demographics ==
As of 2011 India census, Kottayi-I had a population of 12,654 with 6,119 males and 6,535 females.
