= Kottayi-II =

- village
- Location in Kerala, India Kottayi-II (India)
- Coordinates: 10.764614°N 76.545203°E
- Country: India
- State: Kerala
- District: Palakkad

Population (2011)
  - Total: 9,383

Languages
  - Official: Tamil, Malayalam
- Time zone: UTC+5:30 (IST)
- PIN: 6XXXXX
- Vehicle registration: KL-

Kottayi-II is a village in the Palakkad district, state of Kerala, India. Kottayi-II and Kottayi-I come under the Kottayi gram panchayat.

== Demographics ==
As of 2011 India census, Kottayi-II had a population of 9,383 with 4,491 males and 4,892 females.
