= Thenkurissi Gram Panchayat =

Gram panchayat in Kerala, India

Thenkurissi is a gram panchayat in the Palakkad district, state of Kerala, India, situated about 4km off the National Highway NH544 (named NH47 earlier). It is a local government organisation that serves the villages of Thenkurissi-I and Thenkurissi-II. The 2018 Malayalam film Odiyan starring Mohanlal and Manju Warrier features Thenkurissi village.

== See also ==
- Vilayannur
