= Kannambra =

Gram panchayat in the Palakkad district, Kerala, India

Kannambra is a gram panchayat in the Palakkad district, state of Kerala, India. It is the local government organisation that serves the villages of Kannambra-I and Kannambra-II.

According to William Logan in the 1700s, only Kannambra Vela and Kavassery Pooram existed in the then Palakkad district. In William Logan's Malabar Manual, the first authoritative history book of Kerala published in 1887, only these two festivals are mentioned in the then Palakkad district. Palakkad was only a taluk in the then Malabar district. Therefore, the present-day Valluvanadan areas are not included in this area.

Kannambra Kavu is the first and oldest Kavu in Palakkad region

- kannambra is famous for Kannambra Vela . It is celebrated yearly at every May 24/25 . This Vela is the oldest festival in Palakkad district. The biggest festival in Palakkad is Kannambra Vela. In the present biggest firework in Palakkad district is Kannambra Vela.
- it is also known as Chakka vela. Chakka Vela means the festival of jackfruit harvesting. Kannambra Vela is the last Vela festival in Palakkad district. It is conducted at Kannambra Bhagavati Temple.
- Biggest fire work in Palakkad district.
- Kannambara Vela is the oldest Vela festival in Palakkad district. The Kannambara Vela is mentioned in William Logan's Malabar Manual, an authoritative history book of Kerala.
- It is said that the goddess who conducts Kavassery Pooram and the goddess who conducts Kannambara Vela are mother and daughter. Therefore, the Kavassery Pooram Kannamba Vela is also seen with equal importance.
- The Nenmara Vallangi Vela was later created in the 1950s, inspired by the Kannamba Vela.
- Tharoor Vela (AD 800), Kunissery Kummatty (AD 1400) and Puthiyankam Kattussery Vela (AD 1500) are the oldest Vela festivals created later by taking inspiration from these two festivals.

== Demographics ==
As of 2011 India census, Kannambra-I had a population of 14,303 with 6,984 males and 7,319 females. As of 2011 India census, Kannambra-II had a population of 10,768 with 5,197 males and 5,571 females.
