= Kizhakkancherry =

Gram panchayat in Palakkad district, Kerala, India

Kizhakkancherry is a gram panchayat in the Palakkad district, state of Kerala, India. It is a local government organisation that serves the villages of Kizhakkencheri-I and Kizhakkencheri-II. It was formed in the year of 1951 and is the fourth largest grama panchayath in Kerala. It covers an area of 112.56 km^{2} and comprises 22 wards. The boundaries are Vadakkencherry (north), Pananjeri (south), Vandazhy (east) and Kannambra (west). The village is located 37.4 km from the city of Palakkad and 34.9 km from Thrissur.

Nearest railway stations: Palakkad Junction (39.9 km), Palakkad town (34 km)

Nearest airports: Cochin International airport (78.6 km), Coimbatore (98.8 km)

== Geography ==
The village is situated in the foothills of Western Ghats, which covers a major part of the land area. A major tributary of the Bharathapuzha River known as Gayathri River passes through Kizhakkanchery.

== Demographics ==
As of 2011 India census, Kizhakkencheri-I had a population of 23,344 with 11,500 males and 11,844 females.

As of 2011 India census, Kizhakkencheri-II had a population of 17,584 with 8,661 males and 8,923 females.

The village has a majority of below average income groups who depend mostly on agriculture for their living. The majority of the population are Hindus, closely followed by Christians and Muslims. The cultivation of crops showed a sharp turn towards the cash crops like rubber, spices etc at the end of 19th century due to the migration in the hilly areas.

== History ==
It is a place which showcased the uprising of peasants for their rights during the National movement in India. The communist movements were strong in these areas which helped the poor farmers to regain their land from the feudal landlords. Still, the remains of the land revolution remains in the heart of the people, which can be correlated to the stronghold of communist party in these areas.

== Places of interest ==
=== Kizhakkencherry Agraharam ===
This is the street located on the banks of Mangalam puzha (cherukunnu river). where the groups of Tamil Brahmins live together like Kalpathi agraharam in Palakkad. Mostly, the Tamil Brahmin population in Palakkad lives in the vicinity of river banks in groups. This is regarded as the place allocated to them by the king during their time of migration.

=== Sree Nedumparambath Bhagavathi temple ===
Saint Francis school

SOBHA ICON, Moolamkode. An institution for the Icons of the future. Established (2013) and run by the Sri Kurumba Educational and Charitable Trust under Sri PNC Menon of Sobha Ltd. Dr. Gangadharan Vayankara is the director. Visit:https://www.sobhaicon.org/

=== GHSS Kizhakkencherry ===
Thiruvarayappan temple

Kattunkulakara bhagavathy temple, mampad

== Festivals ==
=== Kizhakkencherry Ratholsavam ===
It is a festival of Tamil Brahmins who resides in the Kizhakkencherry agraharam. It is the festival in which a chariot holding the idol of the deity and pulled by people through the streets of agraharas. It is common in all parts of Palakkad where Tamil Brahmins live. Usually December 25th every year. (Margazhi 10 or Dhanu 10)

=== Kizhakkencherry Vela ===
This is the festival done to please the goddess of temple and has active participation from all the sections of the society in the area. It is accompanied with elephants, 'Vaadhyams' and fire crackers.

=== Kanyar Kali ===
It is a ritualistic artform performed by rigorous training by artists. It is evolved during ancient times as a sort of entertainment for the local communities and act as a mode of get together for them. It extends over three nights during the month of May.
