= P. K. Biju =

Indian politician

P.K. Biju
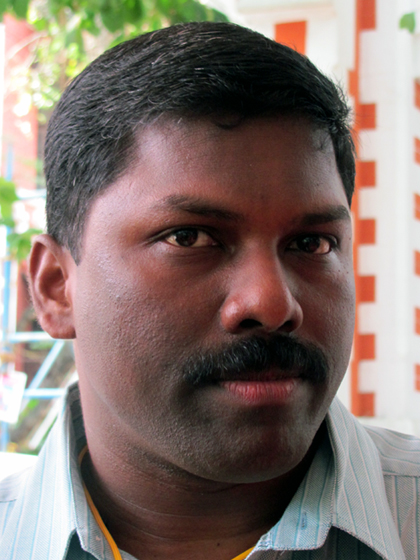

Member of Indian Parliament for Alathur
- In office 16 May 2009 – 23 May 2019
- Preceded by: Constituency Established (S. Ajaya Kumar as Member from Ottapalam Before Delimitation)
- Succeeded by: Ramya Haridas, INC

Personal details
- Born: 3 April 1974 (age 52) Kottayam, Kerala
- Party: CPI(M)
- Spouse: Viji Vijayan
- Education: Kuriakose Elias College, Mannanam
- Website: http://www.pkbijump.in/

Parayamparanbil Kuttappan Biju (born 3 April 1974) is an Indian politician. He is a former member of the Indian Parliament in the 15th and 16th Lok Sabha of India, and represented Alathur (Lok Sabha constituency) till May 2019. He lost in the general elections to the 17th Lok Sabha.

== Political career ==
P. K. Biju was the former All India President of Students' Federation of India and President Kerala State Committee. He was the President of Kottayam SFI District committee in Kerala.

He is currently the Kerala state secretariat committee member of the Communist Party of India (Marxist).
