= Desamangalam =

- village
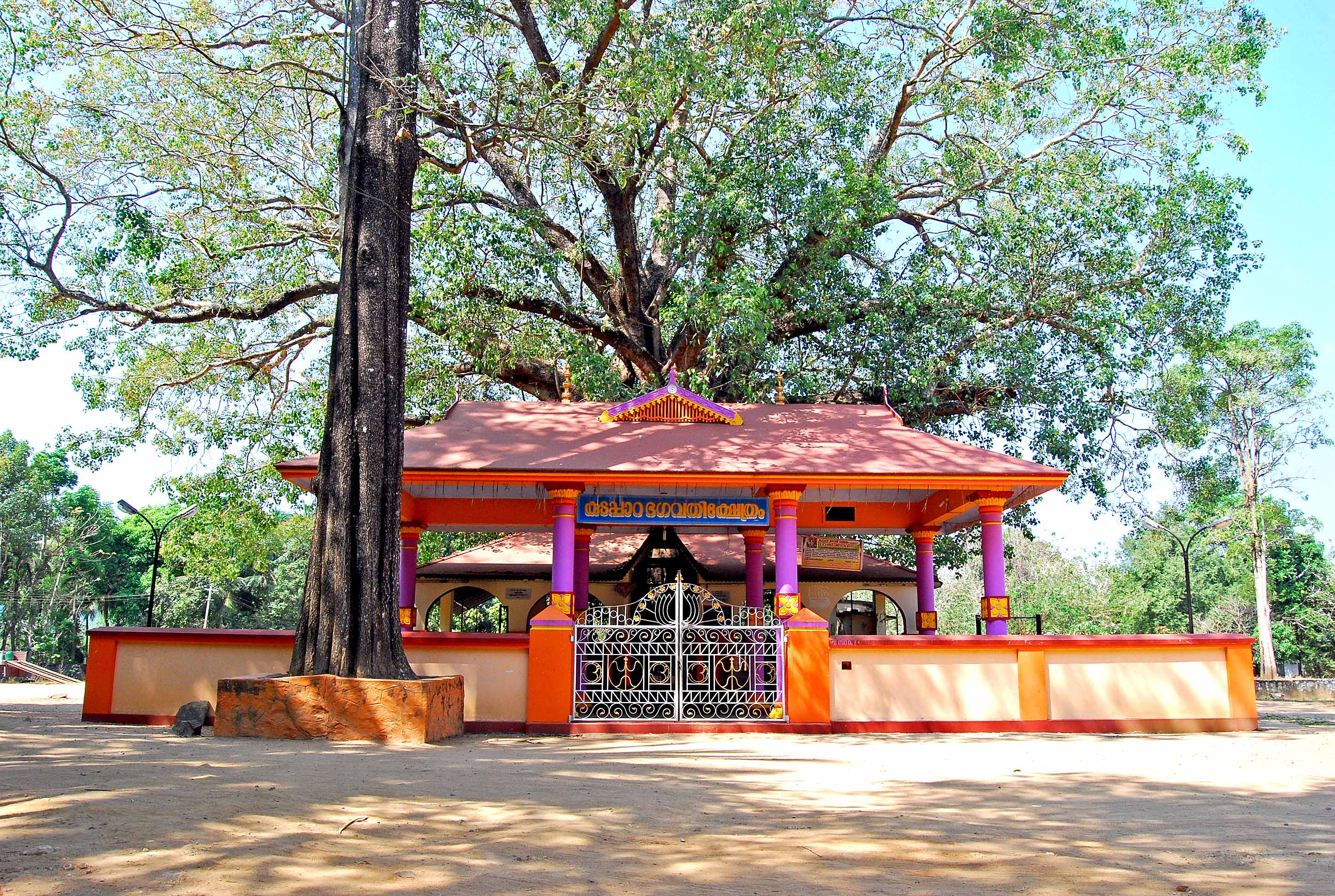
- Kudappara Temple, Deshamangalam
- Interactive map of Desamangalam
- Coordinates: 10.7474400°N 76.23827°E
- Country: India
- State: Kerala
- District: Thrissur

Population (2011)
  - Total: 8,355

Languages
  - Official: Malayalam, English
- Time zone: UTC+5:30 (IST)
- PIN: 679532
- Vehicle registration: KL-48

Desamangalam is a village in Thrissur district which located in the state of Kerala, India.

== Demographics ==
As of 2011 India census, Desamangalam had a population of 8355 with 4026 males and 4329 females.

== Geography ==
Desamangalam is a small village surrounded by Shoranur in the east, Kunnamkulam in the west, Pattambi in the north and Wadakkancherry in the south. It is around 12 kilometres away from Shoranur, on the Shoranur-Guruvayur Road, Shoranur being one of the important railway junctions of Southern Railway.It is situated on the banks of Bharathappuzha.

== History ==
Desamangalam was known for "mana", the residence of "Nambuthiries", the Brahmin community of Kerala, who were traditionally temple priests, but were the landlords and local rulers. Kerala was divided into three parts with Malabar comprising districts like Palakkad, Kozhikode, Malappuram, Kannur and Kasarkode. The central Kerala with districts like Trichur, Ernakulam formed the Cochin area and was under the direct rule of the Cochin Royals. Malabar rulers were known as Zamorins. Travancore region consists of districts south of Ernakulam like Alleppey, Kottayam, Kollam (Quilon) and Trivandrum. Nairs is the majority community in Desamangalam and all faiths coexist without any cast or religious feelings.

== Desamangalam Government VH School ==
The Government High School at Desamangalam was established in 1913. It became a High School in 1967 with the first SSLC batch passing out in 1967. Later the school was converted to a Vocational Higher secondary School.

== Economy ==
Desamangalam Service co operative Society (renamed Bank) is another institution which has been in the forefront of service to the local population. Mahila Samajam is the third social and community set up in Desamangalam. There is a "Grameena Vayanasala" (Village library) which caters to the intellectual pursuits of the local community.

== Art and culture ==
Desamangalam is known for various art forms. Thai Pooyam, Desamangalam pooram etc. are well known. "Chozhi kettu" is another art form unique to Desamangalam and surrounding places like Arangottukara, Pallam, kondayur, Pallur etc.

== Tourism ==
Desamangalam has been the home for many Malayalam movie shoots like Padmarajan. Bharathan, Dennis Joseph and Suhasini Maniratnam for the movies like Adharvam, Keli (film), Njan Gandharvan and Indira (1995 film). Many actors like Prem Nazir, Sheela, Mammootty Mohanlal used to visit the place several times during their film shoots. It is proud of its rich cultural heritage and peaceful coexistence of various religions and faiths for decades.
