= Ramya Haridas =

Indian politician

Member Of Kerala Legislative Assembly
- Incumbent
- Assumed office 23 May 2026
- Preceded by: V. Sasi
- Constituency: Chirayinkeezhu

Member of the Parliament
- In office 23 May 2019 – 4 June 2024
- Preceded by: P. K. Biju
- Succeeded by: K. Radhakrishnan
- Constituency: Alathur

Personal details
- Born: 11 January 1986 (age 40) kuttikkattoor, Kozhikode, Kerala, India
- Party: Indian National Congress (INC)
- Parents: P. Haridasan; Radha
- Occupation: Politician; Social worker

Ramya Haridas (born 11 January 1986) is an Indian politician and social worker, who served as MP from Alathur Lok Sabha constituency, Kerala, from 2019 to 2024. Currently, Ramya serving as a MLA from Chirayinkeezhu, Attingal in Kerala Legislative Assembly (2026-31). She is a member of the INC in the state of Kerala and the daughter of AIMC worker Radha. She is the only female parliamentarian to be elected from the state of Kerala in the elections of 2019. She is also the second-ever Dalit woman MP to have been elected from Kerala.

== Political career ==
=== Elections 2019 ===
When her candidature for 2019 elections was announced, she was serving as the Block Panchayat President for Kunnamangalam, Kozhikode district. She was the only Lok Sabha candidate from Kerala handpicked by Congress President Rahul Gandhi.

In the 2019 Indian general election to parliament, she won from Alathur (Lok Sabha constituency) with a margin of 1,58,968 votes against the CPIM candidate P. K. Biju.

Amongst the 2019 cohort of ministers, Ramya Haridas happens to be one of the least wealthy politicians- her total assets valuing just Rs 22,816.

Ramya Haridas also resorted to a crowdfunding campaign to raise money for her election expenses. It was a huge success as it raised more than Rs 10 lakh. John Samuel, a former director of United Nations Development Programme, and also someone who was involved in raising funds for Kerala Floods Relief spearheaded her fundraising campaign that was called 'Ramya Haridas Challenge Fund.' Shashi Tharoor also shared her campaign appeal on his Facebook page. During her election campaign in Alathur, Ramya Haridas claims she had only three sets of dresses. By the end of her campaign, she had 56 of them, all donated by her supporters.

Ramya Haridas is also a singer and she used her talent to attract voters during her election campaign. Several voters would flock to hear her sing during her campaign.

She also lodged a complaint with the police against Communist party of India (Marxist) politician A Vijayaraghavan for making an inappropriate remark about her.

Election 2024 Lok sabha

Ramya contested in the same Alathur parliament constituency. She conceded to CPI(M) candidate K Radhakrishnan.

2024 Assembly by-election

In 2024 Assembly by election which constituted elections to two Kerala assembly constituencies and one loksabha constituency, Ramya contests in Chelakkara assembly constituency.

== Personal life ==
Ramya Haridas's father was a daily wage labourer and her mother was a tailor.
