= Thenkurissi-II =

- village
- Country: India
- State: Kerala
- District: Palakkad

Population (2011)
  - Total: 13,010

Languages
  - Official: Malayalam, English
- Time zone: UTC+5:30 (IST)
- PIN: 6XXXXX
- Vehicle registration: KL-

Thenkurissi-II is a village in Palakkad district in the state of Kerala, India.

== Demographics ==
As of 2011 India census, Thenkurissi-II had a population of 13,010 with 6,227 males and 6,783 females.
