= Melarcode =

Melarcode Mayilattoor
- Village
- Interactive map of Melarcode
- Coordinates: 10.616659°N 76.569664°E
- Country: India
- State: Kerala
- District: Palakkad

Population (2011)
  - Total: 25,000

Languages
  - Official: Malayalam, Tamil, English
- Time zone: UTC+5:30 (IST)
- PIN: 678703
- Telephone Code: 0492
- Vehicle registration: KL-

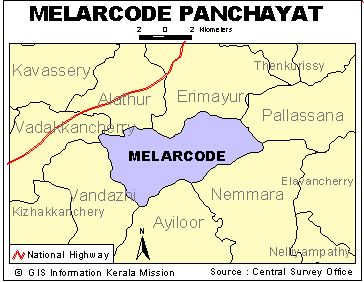

Melarcode is a village and Gram Panchayat in Palakkad District, Kerala, South India. "Mayilattoor" was the former name of Melarcode ("Mayil" meaning peacock), probably due to the presence of many peacocks in the village.

Melarcode has a developed cultural background. Melarcode has produced many fine artists in the field of Carnatic Music and Namasankeerthanam like Melarcode Vaidhyanathan (Vaithy) Bhagavathar and Melarcode Ravi Bhagavathar. North Village (Vadakke Gramam) in Melarcode is considered to be one of the most beautiful Agraharam-s in Palakkad District. Annual Uthsavam is being celebrated every year in the months of April / May. The place is 70% covered with paddy fields, ponds, canals and temples.

== Transportation ==
Melarcode is well connected with all parts of Kerala with NH 544 just 10 km away. The village lies 25 km south of Palakkad Town. The nearest airport is Coimbatore, and Kochi airport is 95 km south of the village.

== Banks ==
Melarcode has established banks such as Canara Bank and Dhanlaxmi Bank. Melarcode has a sizable migrant population.
