= Kottayi Gram Panchayat =

Local government in India

Kottayi is a gram panchayat in the Palakkad district, state of Kerala, India. It is a local government organisation that serves the villages of Kottayi-I and Kottayi-II.
