= Peringottukurissi Gram Panchayat =

Panchayat in Palakkad, Kerala, India

Peringottukurissi is a gram panchayat in the Palakkad district, state of Kerala, India. It is a local government organisation serving the villages of Peringottukurissi-I and Peringottukurissi-II.
