= Erimayur =

Village in Kerala, India

Erimayur is a gram panchayat in the Palakkad district, state of Kerala, India. It is a local government organization that serves the villages of Erimayur-I and Erimayur-II.

== Demographics ==
As of 2011 India census, Erimayur-I had a population of 15,319 with 7,461 males and 7,858 females.

As of 2011 India census, Erimayur-II had a population of 15,302 with 7,501 males and 7,801 females.
