= Kandam Kandath =

The Kandam Kandath house (Kandam kandath joint-family) {Malayalam: Kandam kandath Tharavad} is big family house built by a landlord kuppavelan in 1794.

Their primary language is Malayalam. The main ancestry and the present residence of most of the nuclear families belonging to the Kandam kandath house is the Pallanchathanur village in Palakkad district, Kerala. The name 'Kandam kandath' is a portmanteau of two Malayalam words 'kandam', which means 'rice-field' and 'kandath', which means 'in a rice-field'. Therefore, the name 'Kandam kandath' indicates the fact that several earlier generations of this joint-family had possessed hundreds of acres of rice-field which would amount to more than half of the village of Pallanchathanur, which meant de facto that these Mannadiars were the official village-headmen of the Pallanchathanur village for over two hundred years.
