= Pallanchathanur =

Village in Kerala, India

Coordinates: 10°44′27.6″N 76°35′52.6″E

Pallanchathanur is a small village in Palakkad district, Kerala, India. This small Village is part of Kuzhalmannam Block in Palakkad District. It comes under Mathur Panchayath. It belongs to Central Kerala Division . It is located 9 KM towards west from District head quarters Palakkad. Pallanchathanur is known for its serene atmosphere and lush greenery, the village offers a peaceful escape from the hustle and bustle of city life.

Agriculture is a major economic activity in the village. Rice, coconut, and areca nut are some of the crops cultivated in Pallanchathanur. Village is surrounded by beautiful landscapes, including paddy fields, coconut groves, and hills. Residents of Pallanchathanur continue to adhere to traditional customs and practices, preserving the village's cultural heritage.

The village is home to several temples and shrines. Pallanchathanur Bhagavathy Temple, Vadakkunnathan Kshethram, Gopalakrishna Swamy Temple, Kolakkurissi Appan Temple are a few to name. The Theruvathapally, a mosque famous for religious harmony and its multi religious followers across the region is located in Pallanchathanur. These places of worship hold cultural and religious significance for the local community.

In earlier generations, the village was separated in to various hamlets (Thara) on the trades of the people who used to live in the Thara. Pallanchathanur Agraharam (Hindu Priests), Nair Thara(Clerks & Agriculturists), Achaari Thara(Carpenters, Blacksmiths, Masons etc.), Chetty Thara(Weavers) are a few examples. As the generations progressed these bifurcations have become invisible and all communities are sharing a common space.
