= Thadukkassery =

- village
- Country: India
- State: Kerala
- District: Palakkad

Languages
  - Official: Malayalam, English
- Time zone: UTC+5:30 (IST)
- PIN: 678641
- Vehicle registration: KL-09

Thadukkassery is a village in Keralassery Grama Panchayath, Palakkad District, in the Kerala state of India.
