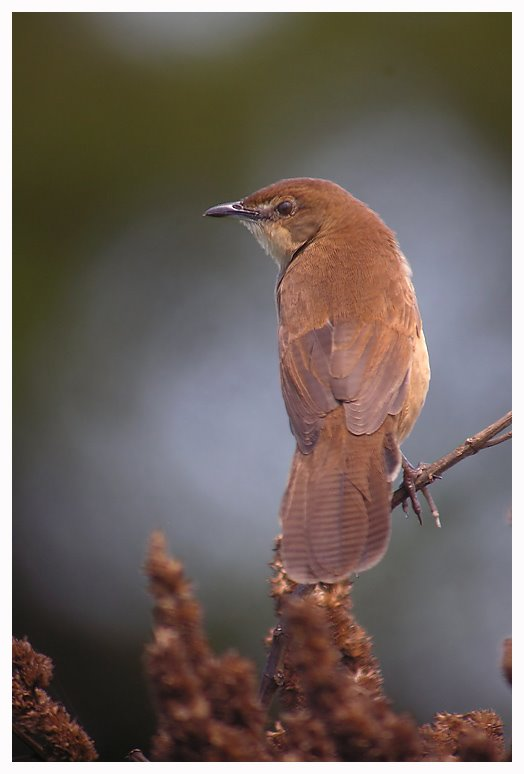
- Broad-tailed grassbird (Schoenicola platyurus)

Scientific classification
- Kingdom: Animalia
- Phylum: Chordata
- Class: Aves
- Order: Passeriformes
- Family: Locustellidae
- Genus: Schoenicola; Blyth, 1844

Type species
- Thimalia platyura Jerdon, 1841

= Schoenicola =

Genus of birds

Schoenicola is a genus of Old World warbler in the family Locustellidae. There are two species, both from peninsular India. The genus has been placed in the subfamily Megalurinae.

A 2018 study found that the African species brevirostris formerly placed in the genus Schoenicola and the Indian species S. platyurus were not closely related, with the Indian species being a sister of the bristled grassbird, which was considered as Chaetornis striata. The African species, fan-tailed grassbird, is now placed in its own monotypic genus Catriscus.

The genus currently contains the following two species:

Image	Common name	Scientific name	Distribution
	Bristled grassbird	Schoenicola striatus	Endemic to the Indian subcontinent, patchily distributed in Bangladesh, India, Nepal, and Pakistan.
	Broad-tailed grassbird	Schoenicola platyurus	Endemic to the Western Ghats of India with a possibility of occurrence in Sri Lanka.
