= Kottiyoor Wildlife Sanctuary =

Wildlife sanctuary in Kannur district

Kottiyoor Wildlife sanctuary
- IUCN category IV (habitat/species management area)
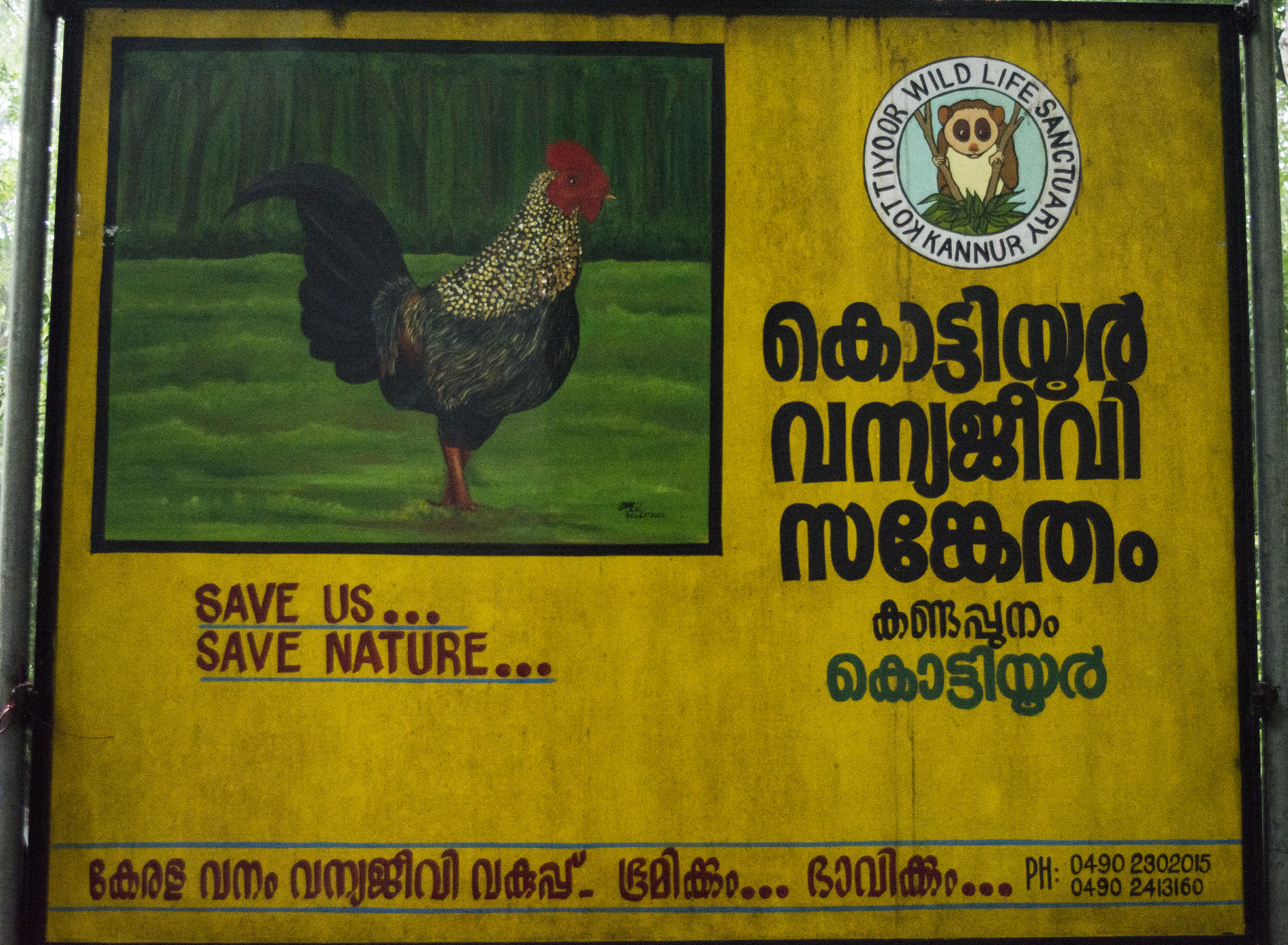
- Sign at the wildlife sanctuary

- Location within Kerala Location within India
- Interactive map of Kottiyoor Wildlife sanctuary
- Location: Kannur district, Kerala, India
- Coordinates: 11°53′02.6″N 75°51′26.5″E
- Area: 30.3798 km^{2} (11.7 sq mi)
- Established: 2011
- Governing body: Department of forests, Government of Kerala

Kottiyoor Wildlife Sanctuary is Wildlife Sanctuary located in Eastern Hilly Areas in Kannur district of Kerala, India. Situated near to other sanctuaries in Kerala and Karnataka, the Kottiyoor Wildlife Sanctuary is rich in biodiversity and rich flora and fauna. This Wildlife Sanctuary connects Kannur and Wayanad Districts.

== History ==
As per government order numbers G.O(MS)No.17/2011/F&WL, Kottiyoor reserve forest, a part of Nilgiri Biosphere Reserve was declared as Kottiyoor Wildlife Sanctuary on 1 March 2011.

== Description ==
Kottiyoor Wildlife Sanctuary is a wildlife sanctuary located in Kottiyoor village in Kannur district of Kerala. This wildlife sanctuary is located close to the Aralam Wildlife Sanctuary and the Wayanad Wildlife Sanctuary in Kerala and Brahmagiri Wildlife Sanctuary in Karnataka. Forests in the sanctuary include evergreen forests, semi-evergreen forests, deciduous forests and grasslands. The Bavali River, a tributary of Valapattanam River flows through the boundaries of the sanctuary.

== Flora and fauna ==
There are more than 41 species of mammals recorded in the sanctuary including Asian elephant, Tiger, Leopard Gaur, Sambar deer, Barking deer, Travancore flying squirrel, Lion-tailed macaque, Nilgiri langur, and Malabar slender loris. The 179 bird species recorded here includes Broad-tailed grassbird, Nilgiri wood pigeon, Blue-winged parakeet, Malabar grey hornbill, Grey-headed bulbul, Wayanad laughingthrush, Rufous babbler, White-bellied blue flycatcher, White-bellied treepie and Nilgiri pipit. The Kottiyoor Wildlife Sanctuary is also the home to 36 species of reptiles, 23 species of amphibians, 29 species of fish, 216 species of butterflies and 55 species of odonates. The Cnemaspis kottiyoorensis, endemic to Kerala, is named after its locality, Kottiyoor.
