= Bamboo textile =

Textile made from various parts of the bamboo plant

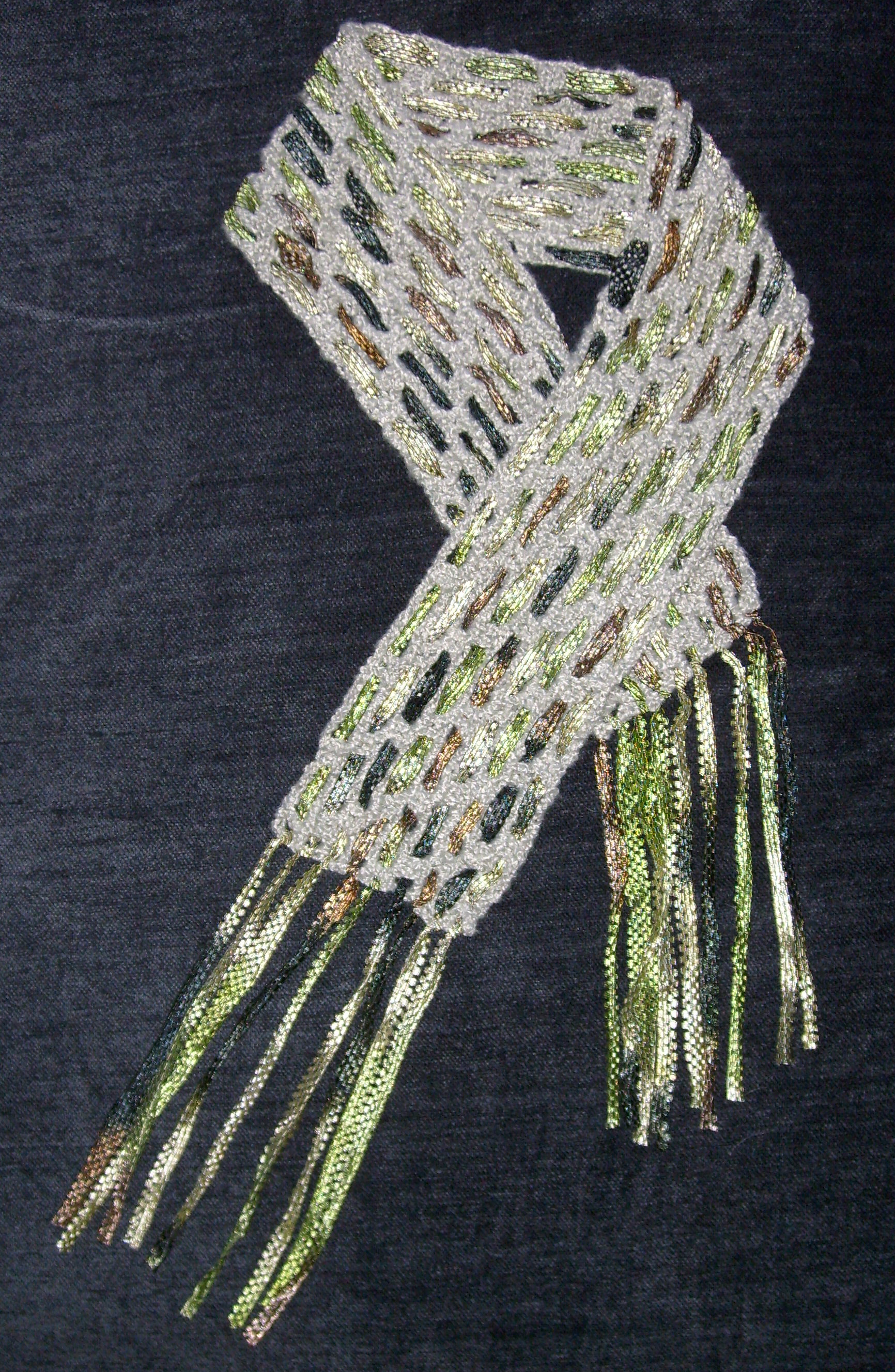
A scarf made of bamboo yarn and synthetic ribbon

Bamboo textile is any cloth, yarn or clothing made from bamboo fibres.

Modern textiles which claim to be made from bamboo are usually made from viscose rayon instead, a regenerated cellulose fibre using wood pulp as its raw material. Many jurisdictions prohibit labeling such products as bamboo unless they contain actual bamboo fiber. This process removes the natural characteristics of the raw material, rendering it identical to rayon from other cellulose sources.

== Types ==
Bamboo fibres are all cellulose fibre extracted or fabricated from natural bamboo, but they vary widely.

Textiles labelled as being made from bamboo are usually not made by mechanical crushing and retting of bamboo, but by using bamboo chips as raw material for rayon. Bamboo is also used whole and in strips; these strips may be considered stiff fibers.

=== Stiff strips ===
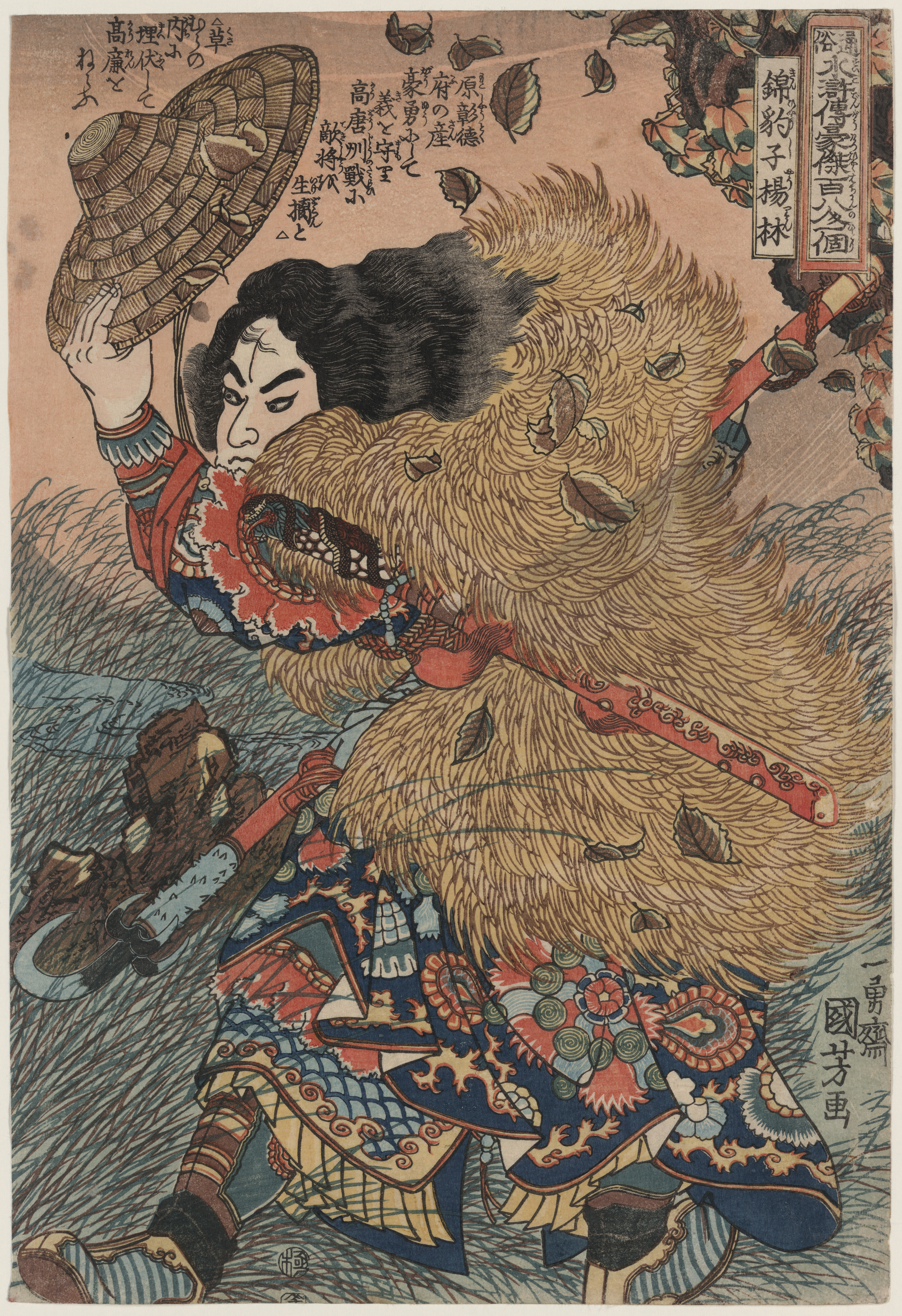
Kinhyōshi yōrin (Yang Lin), hero of the Suikoden, holding a bamboo hat, from Utagawa Kuniyoshi's series of woodblock prints illustrating the 108 Suikoden

Bamboo can be cut into thin strips and used for basketry.

In China and Japan, thin strips of bamboo were woven together into hats and shoes. One particular design of bamboo hats was associated with rural life, worn mostly by farmers and fishermen for protection from the sun.

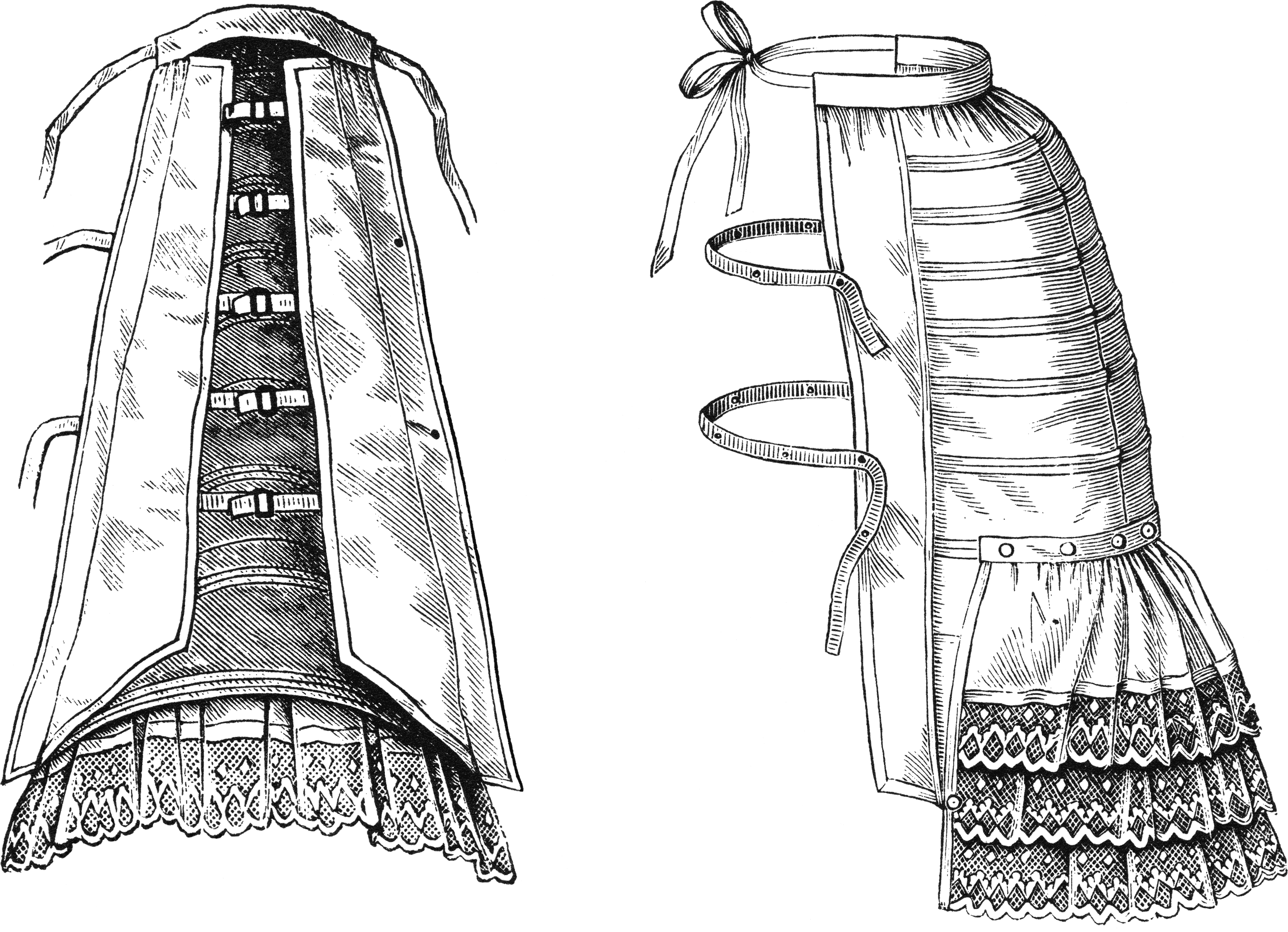
An 1881 bustle design

In the West, bamboo, alongside other components such as whalebone and steel wire, was sometimes used as a structural component in corsets, bustles and other types of structural elements of fashionable women's dresses.

=== Mechanically produced fine bamboo fiber ===
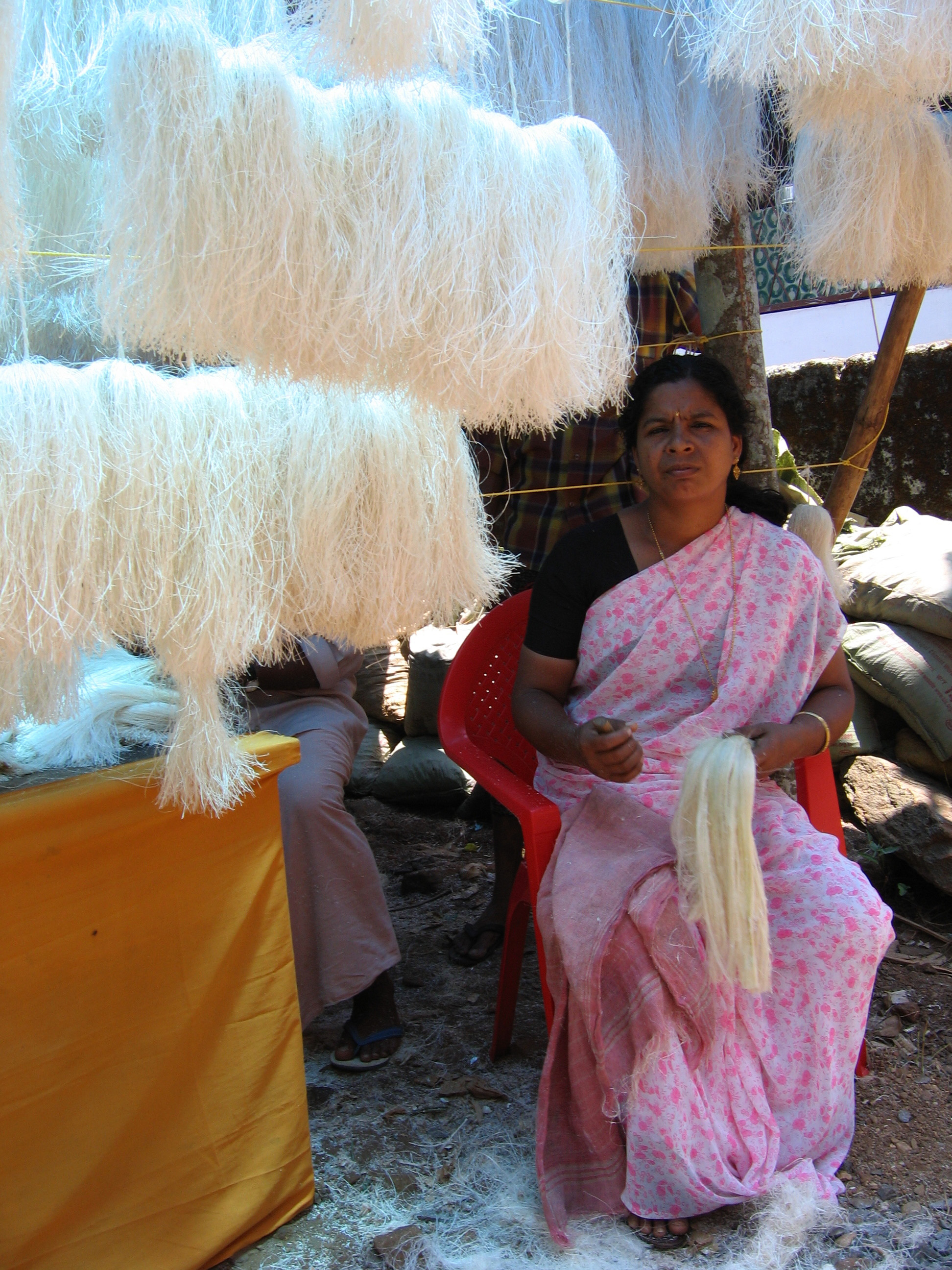
Tufts of retted bamboo fibers for sale at Kottiyoor Temple in Kerala

Some bamboo fibre is made by a mechanical-bacterial process similar to retting flax into linen fibre. In this way, the woody part of the bamboo is crushed mechanically before an enzyme-retting and washing process is used to break down the walls and extract the fibre. The natural enzyme comes from pre-existing microorganisms on the bamboo. The same manufacturing process is used to produce linen fabric from flax or hemp. Bamboo fabric made from this process is sometimes called bamboo linen. The natural processing of bamboo allows the fibre to remain strong and produce a high quality product. This process gives a material that is very durable, as the mechanically produced bamboo linen retains more of bamboo’s natural texture and strength compared to chemically processed alternatives.

Another means of extracting fibre from bamboo, and probably the only purely mechanical process of extraction anywhere in the world, is practiced in the days preceding the annual festival of the Kottiyur Temple of Kerala, India. The handcrafted bamboo artifact, known locally as "odapoovu" is in the form of a tuft of white fibres of up to 30 cm (1 ft) in length. The article is made out of newly emerging Ochlandra travancorica culms, which go through a process of alternating pounding with stones and retting in water lasting several days, followed by a combing to remove the pith, leaving the cream white fibres and a stub of the bamboo. The fibre is too coarse (and the process too cumbersome) to be of much use in making fine yarn, thread or textiles.

=== Bamboo rayon ===
Rayon, also known as "viscose" per ISO standard 2076, is a semi-synthetic fiber made by chemically reshaping cellulose. Clothing described as manufactured from bamboo fibre is often, in reality, man-made viscose fibre extracted from bamboo feedstock used for processing into viscose rayon (rayon is also made from cellulose from other sources). The U.S. Environmental Protection Agency (EPA) noted that the manufacturing process further purifies the cellulose, alters the physical form of the fibre, and modifies the molecular orientation within the fibre and its degree of polymerization. The end product is still cellulose, and is functionally identical to rayon made from cellulose from other plant sources.

==== Advertising standards ====
Many countries have regulations that prohibit the marketing of viscose rayon derived from bamboo as just "bamboo". However, many small and direct-to-consumer brands continue to market such products as bamboo online and on social media sites such as Facebook and Instagram in violation of these regulations. A 2021 study found that almost half of online retailers marketed bamboo-derived viscose rayon products as just "bamboo" without disclosing that they were viscose.

In the United States, the Federal Trade Commission (FTC) has ruled that unless a yarn is made directly with bamboo fiber – often called "mechanically processed bamboo" – it must be called "rayon" or "rayon made from bamboo". The FTC has successfully brought lawsuits against major retailers, including Amazon, Kohl's, Macy's, Sears, and Walmart, for misleading and deceptive marketing of rayon as bamboo, and has settled lawsuits against manufacturers for "false and unsubstantiated" claims about such rayon being environmentally friendly, biodegradable, or having antimicrobial properties.

Canada has similar advertisement and labeling standards as the United States, requiring terms such as "viscose", "rayon", or "rayon from bamboo", as does the European Union, requiring terms such as "viscose from bamboo" or "bamboo viscose" per EU Regulation 1007/2011.

In Australia, where fiber content labeling hasn't been federally mandatory since 2010, pillows, bed sheets, cloth diapers, and clothing are frequently marketed as "bamboo," despite lobbying from organizations such as The Textile Institute for stricter labeling laws in line with those in the United States and the European Union.

=== Bamboo composite and biopolymer construction ===
There are various approaches to the use of bamboo in composites and as an additive in biopolymers for construction. In this case, bamboo fibres are extracted through retting or through a steam process where bamboo is injected with steam and placed under pressure and then exposed to the atmosphere, where steam release allows for the collection of fibre.

== Ecological considerations ==
=== Growth ===
Bamboo has many advantages over cotton as a raw material for textiles. Reaching up to 35 metres (115 ft) tall, bamboo is the largest member of the grass family. They are the fastest growing woody plant in the world. One Japanese species has been recorded as growing over 1 m (3 ft 3 in) a day. There are over 1,600 species found in diverse climates from cold mountains to hot tropical regions. About 40 million hectares (100 million acres) of the Earth is covered with bamboo, mostly in Asia.

The bamboo species used for rayon manufacture is called moso bamboo, or just moso. Moso bamboo is the most important bamboo in China, where it covers about 3 million hectares (7.4 million acres) – about two percent of China's forest area. It is the main species for bamboo timber and is said to play an important ecological role.

=== Harvesting ===
Once a new shoot emerges from the ground, the new cane will reach its full height in eight to ten weeks. Each cane reaches maturity in three to five years. It is a grass and so regenerates after being cut just like a lawn without the need for replanting. This regular harvesting stimulates the plant, to regrow at a higher rate and to produce younger, and therefore healthier, faster growing shoots. This is comparable to many cultivated plants, especially trees and bushes as well known examples. This is comparable to pruning. Studies have shown that felling of canes leads to vigorous re-growth and an increase in the amount of biomass the next year.

=== Yield and land use ===
Bamboo can be used as food, fibre and shelter and due to its ease of growth and high growth rate it is a cheap, sustainable, and efficient crop. Bamboo grows densely; its clumping nature enables a lot of it to be grown in a comparatively small area, easing pressure on land use. Average yields for bamboo can reach up to 60 tonnes per hectare (27 short tons per acre), exceeding the average yields of 20 tonnes per hectare (9 short tons per acre) for most trees, and 2 tonnes per hectare (1 short ton per acre) for cotton.

=== Greenhouse gases ===
All plants fix carbon dioxide (CO_{2}), but deforestation results in fewer trees to fix rising quantities of CO_{2}. Because it is fast-growing, bamboo fixes more CO_{2} and generates up to 35 percent more oxygen than similar stands of trees. A bamboo plantation sequesters 62 tonnes per hectare (28 short tons per acre) of carbon dioxide per year, as compared to 15 tonnes per hectare (7 short tons per acre) for a young forest . This CO_{2} only remains fixed if the resulting product is not burned and is allowed to naturally decompose at the end of its lifespan. A typical forest covering the same area can persist more biomass in the long term while also providing a more diverse biotope; however, this effect is only observed over longer time scales due to the comparatively slow growth rate of trees. Harvesting bamboo also requires less deforestation compared to harvesting a similar mass of other cellulose-producing crops, which ultimately results in less CO2 emissions.

=== Deforestation ===
Bamboo planting can slow deforestation, providing an alternative source of timber for the construction industry and cellulose pulp for the textile industry. It allows communities to turn away from the destruction of native forests and construct commercial bamboo plantations that can be selectively harvested annually without the destruction of the grove. Tree plantations have to be chopped down and terminated at harvest but bamboo keeps on growing.

On the other hand forest has been cleared to make way for bamboo plantations.

=== Water use ===
Bamboo uses considerable water, but there is evidence that its water-use efficiency (relative to growth) may be greater than many trees.

=== Soil erosion ===
Yearly replanting of tillage crops increases soil erosion. The extensive root system of bamboo and the fact that it is not uprooted during harvesting means bamboo cultivation is associated with less soil erosion. The bamboo plant's root system can hold soil together along river banks, deforested areas and in places prone to mudslides. Like forest trees, it also greatly reduces rain run-off.

=== Biodegradability ===
Like other cellulose-based clothing materials, bamboo fibre is biodegradable in soil by microorganisms and sunlight. Having reached the end of its useful life, clothing made from bamboo can be composted and disposed of in an organic and environmentally friendly manner.

=== Pesticides and fertilizers ===
There is no need for pesticides or fertilizers when growing bamboo, but herbicide and fertilizer applications are common in some places to encourage edible shoot growth. Bamboo also contains a substance called bamboo-kun–an antimicrobial agent that gives the plant a natural resistance to pest and fungi infestation, though some pathogen problems exist in some bamboo plantations.
