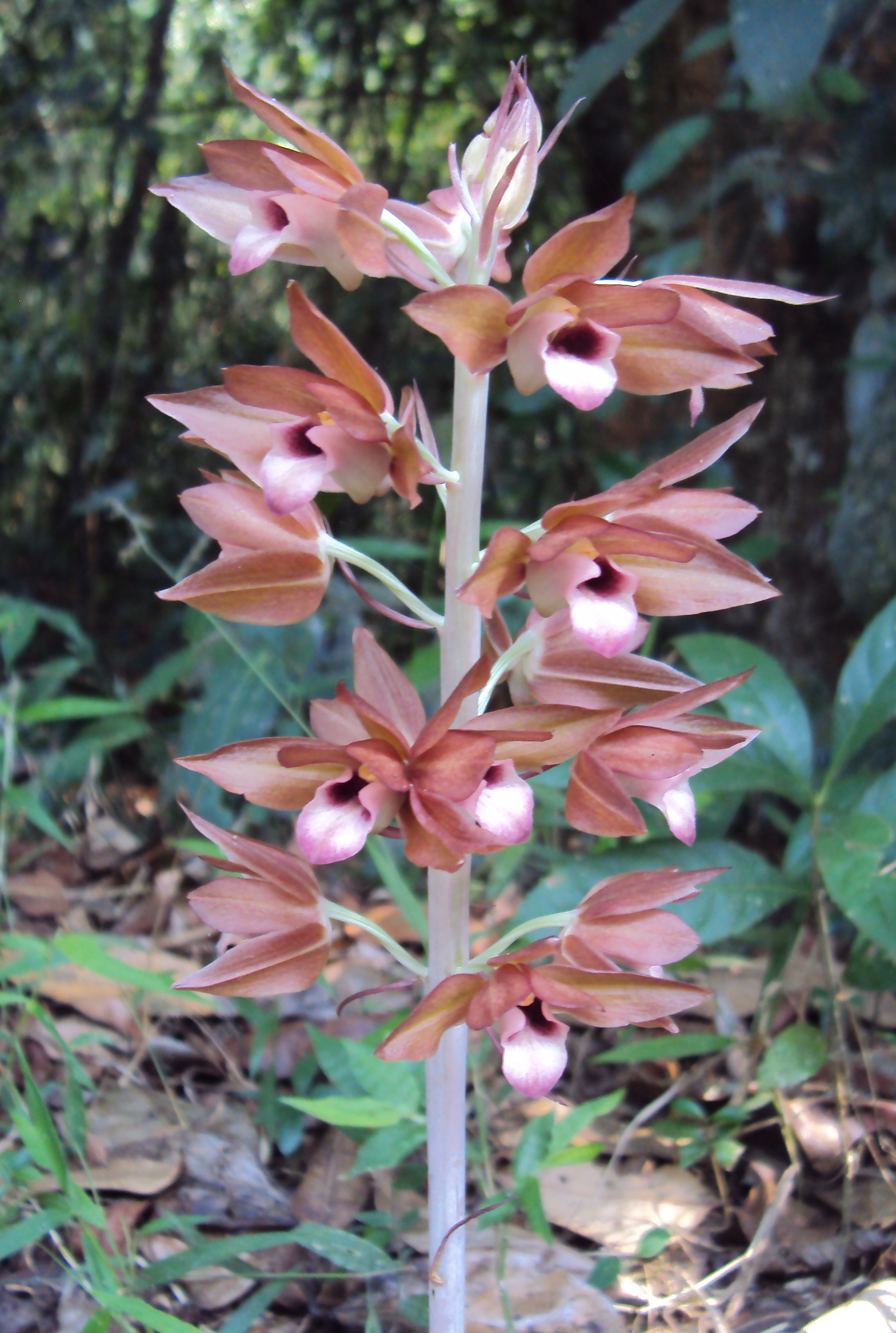
- Eulophia zollingeri near Kottiyoor, India

Scientific classification
- Kingdom: Plantae
- Clade: Embryophytes
- Clade: Tracheophytes
- Clade: Spermatophytes
- Clade: Angiosperms
- Clade: Monocots
- Order: Asparagales
- Family: Orchidaceae
- Subfamily: Epidendroideae
- Genus: Eulophia
- Species: E. zollingeri

Binomial name
- Eulophia zollingeri (Rchb.f.) J.J.Sm.

Synonyms
- List: Cyrtopera zollingeri Rchb.f.; Cyrtopera formosana Rolfe; Cyrtopera papuana Ridl.; Cyrtopera rufa Thwaites; Cyrtopera sanguinea Lindl.; Cyrtopodium rufum (Thwaites) Trimen; Cyrtopodium sanguineum (Lindl.) N.E.Br.; Eulophia carrii C.T.White; Eulophia emilianae C.J.Saldanha; Eulophia formosana (Rolfe) Rolfe; Eulophia macrorhiza Blume; Eulophia macrorhiza var. minahassae Schltr.; Eulophia macrorhizon Hook.f.; Eulophia ochobiensis Hayata; Eulophia papuana (Ridl.) J.J.Sm. nom. illeg.; Eulophia sanguinea (Lindl.) Hook.f.; Eulophia toyoshimae Nakai; Eulophia yushuiana S.Y.Hu; Eulophia zollingeri f. viride Yokota; Eulophia zollingerioides P.O'Byrne; Graphorkis macrorhiza (Blume) Kuntze; Graphorkis papuana (Ridl.) Kuntze; Graphorkis rufa (Thwaites) Kuntze; Graphorkis sanguinea (Lindl.) Kuntze

= Eulophia zollingeri =

Carrion orchid

Species of orchid

Eulophila zollingeri, commonly known as the carrion orchid or 无叶美冠兰 (wu ye mei guan lan), is a plant in the orchid family and is native to areas from tropical and subtropical Asia to Queensland, Australia. It is a leafless, brownish terrestrial orchid with up to forty reddish brown, sharply scented flowers with a dark red and yellow labellum. It grows in decaying wood in and near rainforests.

It is classified as a partial mycoheterotroph that maintains a specialized symbiotic relationship with the wood decaying fungi Psathyrellaceae throughout all life stages. Isotopic analysis and chlorophyll data have shown that the orchid also performs its own photosynthesis during the fruiting stage. Its leafless underground habit is typical of saprophytic orchids but it also can perform photosynthesis in its stems.

== Description ==
Eulophia zollingeri is a terrestrial herb with an underground pseudobulb. It has no green leaves but fleshy, pointed bracts on the flowering stem. Between six and forty reddish brown flowers 40–50 mm (1.6–2.0 in) long and 50–60 mm (2.0–2.4 in) wide are borne on a flowering stem 400–900 mm (20–40 in) tall. The flowers have a sharp, unpleasant odour. The dorsal sepal is elliptic to oblong in shape, 15–23 mm (0.6–0.9 in) long, 4–7 mm (0.2–0.3 in) wide and curves forward. The lateral sepals are more or less oblong in shape, 16–25 mm (0.6–1 in) long, 6–9 mm (0.2–0.4 in) wide and have a pointed tip. The petals are lance-shaped, 11–18 mm (0.4–0.7 in) long, 5–7 mm (0.2–0.3 in) wide. The labellum is dark red, yellow on the outside, oblong to egg-shaped, 14–15 mm (0.55–0.59 in) long, 15–18 mm (0.6–0.7 in) wide and has three lobes. The middle lobe curves downward and has short, thick hairs whilst the side lobes are erect. Flowering occurs between December and February in Australia and from April to May in China

== Taxonomy and naming ==
The carrion orchid was first formally described in 1857 by Heinrich Gustav Reichenbach who gave it the name Cyrtopera zollingeri and published the description in Bonplandia. In 1905, Johannes Jacobus Smith changed the name to Eulophia zollingeri.

== Distribution and habitat ==
Eulophia zollingeri grows in and near the edges of rainforest where there is rotting wood. It occurs in China, Taiwan, India, Indonesia, Japan, Malaysia, New Guinea, the Philippines, Sri Lanka, Thailand, Vietnam and tropical northern Queensland.

== Conservation status ==
=== Australia ===
In Queensland this species is listed as "Endangered" under the states Nature Conservation Act 1992. It is not listed under the Australian Environment Protection and Biodiversity Conservation Act 1999.
