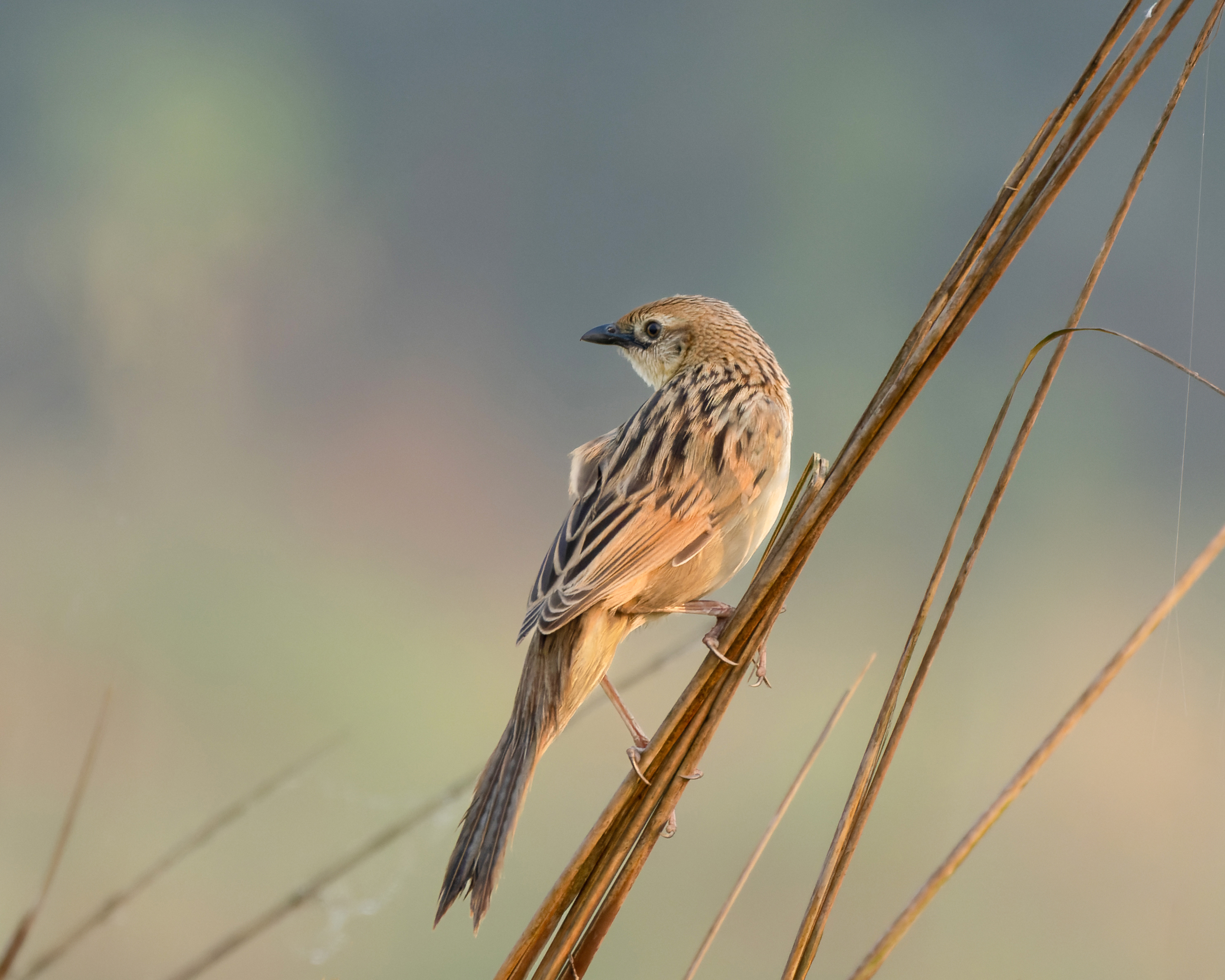
- Schoenicola striatus in Baruipur, West Bengal, India.

Conservation status
- Vulnerable (IUCN 3.1)

Scientific classification
- Kingdom: Animalia
- Phylum: Chordata
- Class: Aves
- Order: Passeriformes
- Family: Locustellidae
- Genus: Schoenicola
- Species: S. striatus

Binomial name
- Schoenicola striatus (Jerdon, 1841)

Synonyms
- Chaetornis striata (Jerdon, 1841); Chaetornis striatus Sibley and Monroe (1990, 1993); Dasyornis colluriceps Blyth, 1842; Dasyornis locustelloides Blyth, 1842; Megalurus striatus Jerdon, 1841; Chaetornis striata

= Bristled grassbird =

Species of bird

The bristled grassbird (Schoenicola striatus) is a small passerine bird in the genus Schoenicola. Also known as the bristled grass warbler, this species is endemic to the Indian subcontinent, where it is patchily distributed in Bangladesh, India, Nepal, and Pakistan. These insectivorous birds skulk in dense and tall grasslands, often in marshy areas, habitats that are threatened by human activities. Formerly considered to be sedentary, the species may be migratory, moving south and east in the Indian peninsula during winter and returning to their breeding grounds in the northern plains south of the Himalayas.

== Description ==
This warbler is large and brownish with broad dark streaks to the feathers of the crown and back and can appear almost babbler-like in appearance (easily mistaken for common babbler). The tail is graduated with white tips to the feathers. The rachis of the tail feathers is dark and there are dark ribs to the feathers. The bill is strong. The tarsus is brown and the bill is black with the lower mandible tipped bluish grey. They have a buff supercilium (brow) and have a pale unmarked underside.

This species was included in the "Old World warbler" family Sylviidae, in the genus Chaetornis but more comprehensive studies on external morphology and DNA sequence studies, have led to its placement in the grass warbler family Locustellidae in the genus Schoenicola as a sister species of S. platyurus.

This genus in the warbler family is distinctive in having a bare patch of skin in front of the eyes (the lores) on which a vertical row of five stiff rictal bristles arise and face forward. The bare skin is flexible and it is thought that the bristles provide protection to the eye as the bird scampers between the dense and rough grass by folding back and forming a kind of cage or visor over the eye . The feathers on the breast are stiff and in some individuals the tips are dark giving it a necklaced appearance. The sexes are similar in plumage.

== Distribution and habitat ==
The habitat in which the bristled grassbird occurs is tall grass-covered marshlands. The distribution range is mainly in the northern part of the Indian subcontinent. It was formerly described as common in at least Gujarat, Andhra Pradesh, West Bengal, Orissa, Lahore (where they bred in the Rakh area), parts of Bangladesh, and Nepal. The species is threatened by the destruction of grassland and marshland habitats. The species was thought to be mainly sedentary with movements related to the rains but they may be migratory, breeding along the riverine plains south of the Himalayas and wintering further east and south in the peninsula of India.

== Behaviour ==
Measurements
Length	♂	160–170 mm (6.3–6.7 in)
	♀	145–155 mm (5.7–6.1 in)
Culmen		12 mm (0.47 in)
Wing		80–92 mm (3.1–3.6 in)
Tail	♂	84–90 mm (3.3–3.5 in)
	♀	72–82 mm (2.8–3.2 in)
Head	♂	35–37 mm (1.4–1.5 in)
	♀	35 mm (1.4 in)
Tarsus		100–200 mm (3.9–7.9 in)

Bristled grassbirds are hard to spot, usually seen briefly at the top of a grass clump but diving in and most often remaining hidden inside grass clumps where they forage for insect prey. Males display by rising above the grass to about a metre or so and zig-zag in the air before parachuting back down. They also call in flight with a rising and falling chwee-chew. The breeding season is from May to September and the nest is a ball of grass with an opening at the top and placed near the base of a grass clump. The usual clutch is four to five eggs, which are thought to be incubated by the female alone. The eggs are white with purplish red speckles.

== Gallery ==
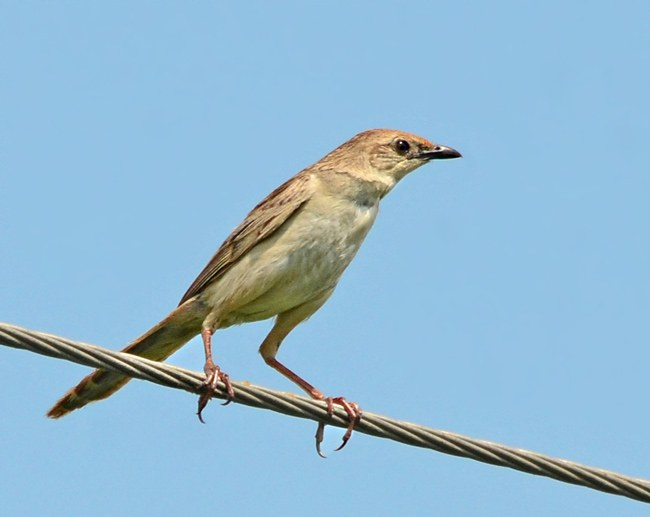
Bristled grassbird (at Dadri)

The bristles are thought to protect the eyes when they forage through dense grass
