= Cnemaspis kottiyoorensis =

Scientific classification
- Kingdom: Animalia
- Phylum: Chordata
- Class: Reptilia
- Order: Squamata
- Suborder: Gekkota
- Family: Gekkonidae
- Genus: Cnemaspis
- Species: C. kottiyoorensis

Binomial name
- Cnemaspis kottiyoorensis Cyriac and Umesh, 2014

Species of lizard

Cnemaspis kottiyoorensis, or the Kottiyoor day gecko, is a species of diurnal gecko endemic to the Western Ghats in Kerala, India.

== Distribution ==
This species is endemic to Kerala, India. In 2014 it was reported that this species is found in Perumalmudi, in the proposed Kottiyoor Wildlife Sanctuary, Kannur District, Kerala.

== Description ==
Cnemaspis kottiyoorensis holotype, an adult female, measures 42 mm (1.7 in) in snout–vent length.
