= Kottiyoor Temple =

Shiva temple in Kerala, India

- Thruchherumana Temple (തൃചേരുമന ക്ഷേത്രം)
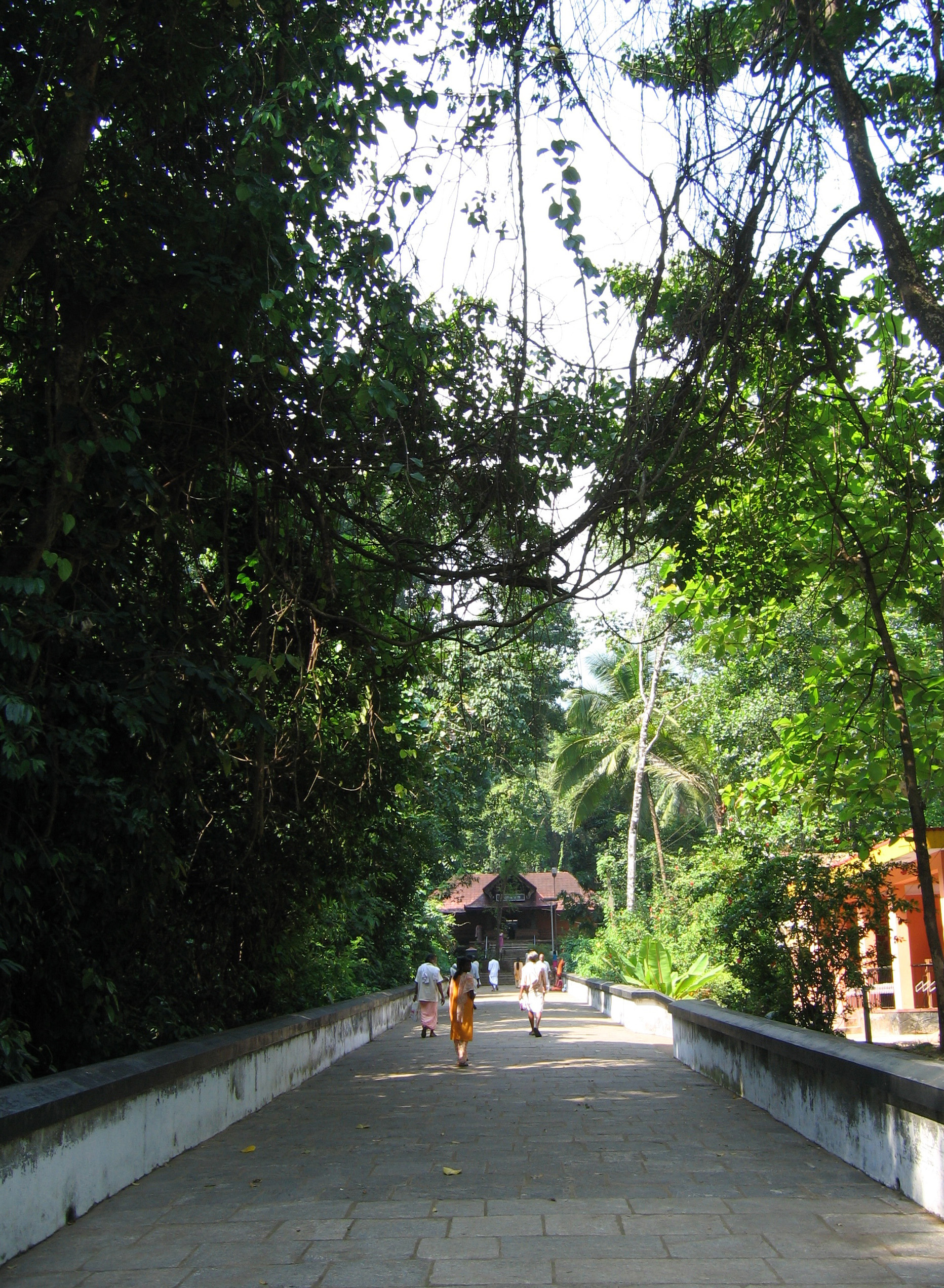
- Main shrine at Kottiyoor surrounded by sacred grove

Religion
- Affiliation: Hinduism
- District: Kannur district
- Deity: Shiva
- Festival: Kottiyoor Vysakha Mahotsavam
- Governing body: Malabar Devaswom Board

Location
- State: Kerala
- Country: India
- Interactive map of Kottiyoor Temple
- Coordinates: 11°52′22.29″N 75°51′39.18″E

Architecture
- Type: Partially Kerala style
- Creator: Unknown
- Completed: Unknown

Website
- http://kottiyoordevaswom.com/

Kottiyoor Temple is a prominent Shiva temple in Kottiyoor, Kannur, Kerala, India. Vadakkeshwaram Temple is the common name of the temple from ancient times, but some of the local people address the temple as Ikkare Kottiyoor as it is on the bank of the river close to the Kottiyoor village, to differentiate it from the shrine in the other side of the river. Thruchherumana Kshetram is also another name by which temple is known. The temple is a special category temple under Malabar Devaswom board.

There are two temples in Kottiyoor, one on the western bank of the Vavali river and the other one on the eastern bank. The shrine on the east bank (Kizhakkeshwaram or Akkare Kottiyoor) is a temporary hermitage (Yaga shrine) opened only during the Kottiyoor Vysakha Mahotsavam. The Vadakkeshwaram or Ikkare Kottiyoor (The Thruchherumana Temple) on the western bank of the river is a permanent temple complex like all other temples. It remains open throughout the year except for the 27 days of Vysakha festival. The temple is situated in a densely forested area amidst a sacred grove that covers about 80 acres. Mythology says that Akkare Kottiyoor, the shrine on the eastern bank of the river, was the location of Daksha Yaga, at the conclusion of which Sati Devi immolated herself in this place.

The Kottiyoor Perumal Temple was, in its heyday in terms of gold and precious stones, the second-wealthiest Temple in the entire Kerala region (second only to the Padmanabhaswamy Temple which even with its smaller five vaults opened, lays claim to the largest collection of gold and precious stones ever, as well as being the wealthiest place of worship in the world). Kottiyur Perumal's collection of gold and precious stones has been stored since time immemorial in the 'Karimbana Gopuram' of the "Ikkare Kottiyoor" Temple. Kottiyoor Perumal also owned over 30,000 acres of forest-lands in Kannur District.

The Thruchherumana Temple was built after the Swayambhoo lingam was found; however the exact date of construction of temple is not known; the pilgrimage has been taking place for many centuries.

== Significance ==
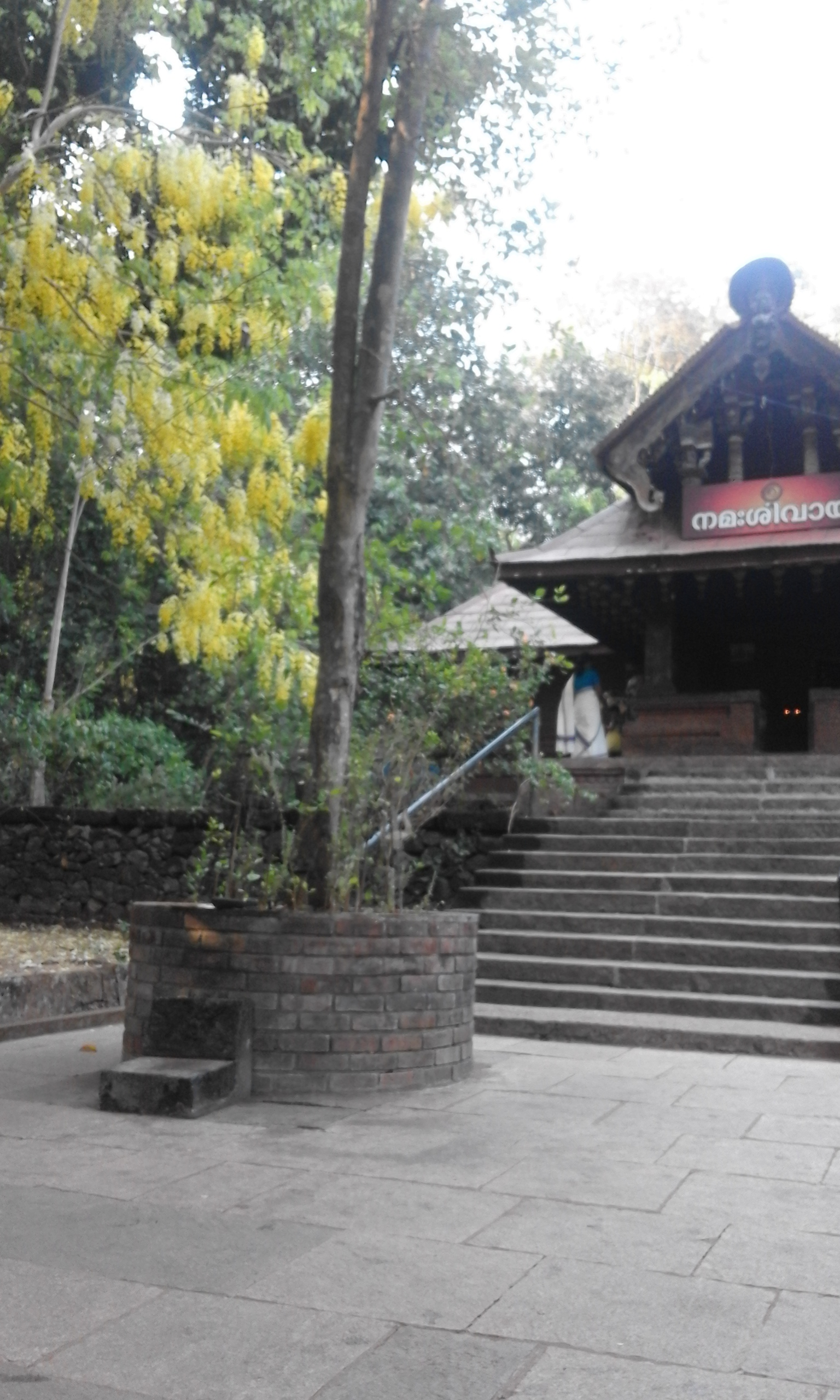
Ikkare Kottiyoor temple with sacred tree in the front.

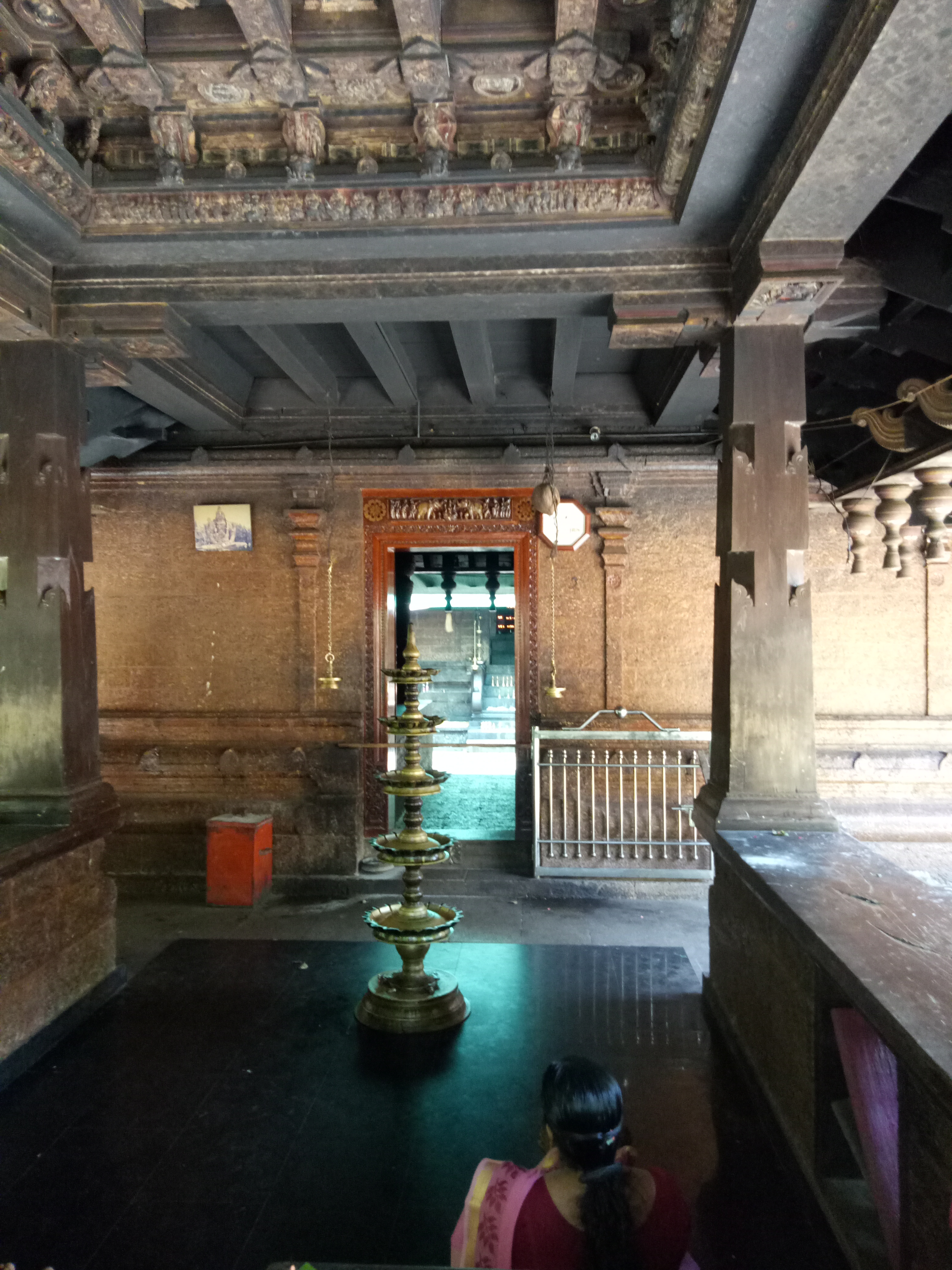
Inside the shrines varanda.

The Kottiyoor Temple is highly revered in Kerala and neighboring areas of adjoining states. The legend goes that the shrine is blessed with the divine presence of The Holy Trinity or The Trimurthy (Brahma - Vishnu - Shiva) and the primordial Mother Goddess (Bhagavathy), due to this Kali (the personification of Kali Yuga), has promised Parashurama in the presence of Trimurthy in not entering the premises of the holy shrine.

Kottiyoor is one of the most sacred shrines of Shakti. There are very few shrines in India for Sati Devi among which Kottiyoor is one. As it is forbidden to build any permanent structures abiding by religious principles, there are only temporary and simple-looking structures, which resemblance what would look like hermits of sages. As there is no sanctum-sanatorium, Sati is worshiped as Shakti in 'Ammarakkalu Thara', a raised platform adjacent to the Swayambhoo linga where Sati Devi immolated herself. This is believed to be the temple of the origin of the Shakta pithas. As it is the confluence of the presence of all the known Hindu Divinities, the place is called Kottiyoor from Koodi and Uuru meaning Meeting Precinct.

The temple is well known for its old structure and is not renovated so as to not disturb the old customs and traditions of the temple.

=== Social participation ===
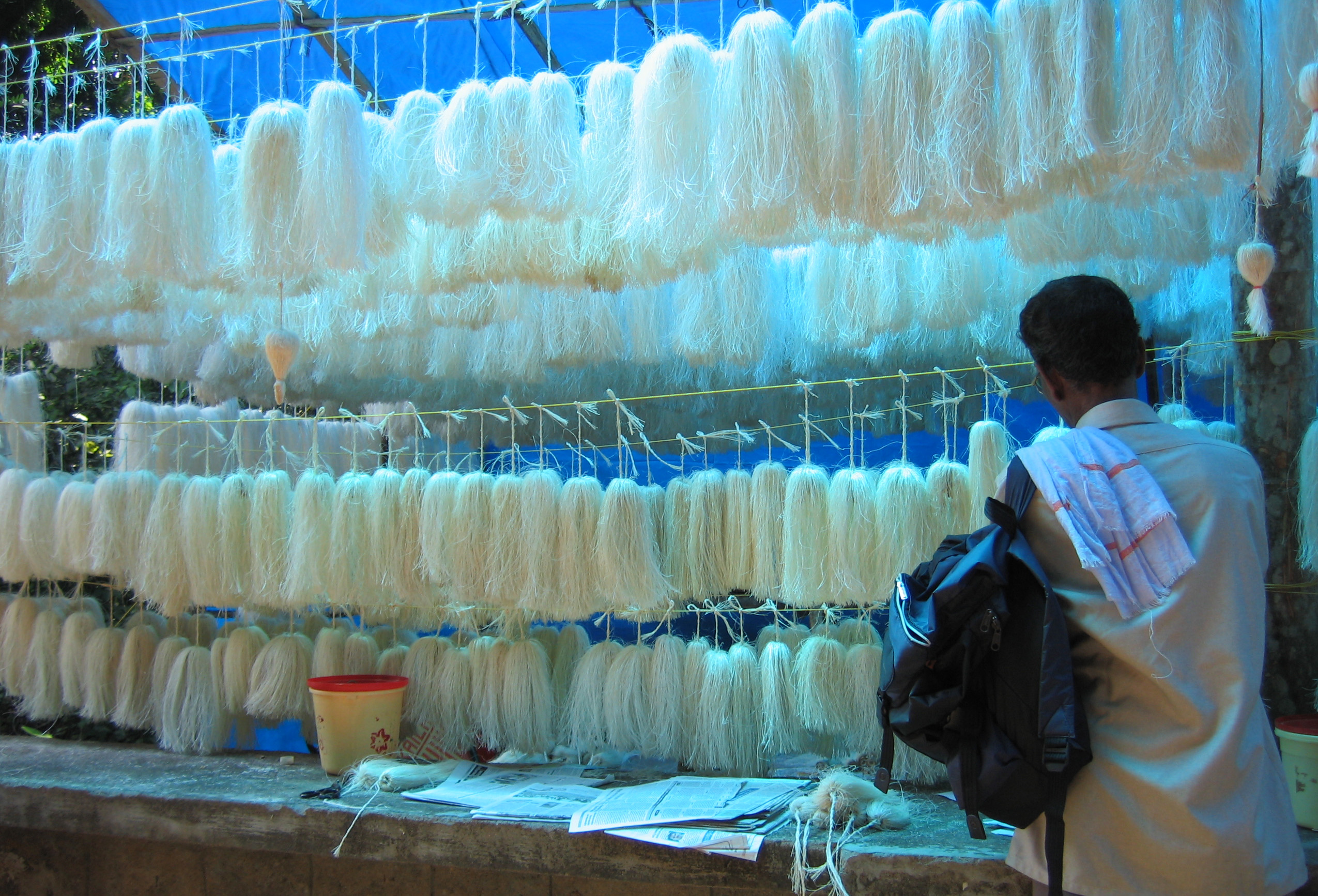
Odappu, a "flower" made of bamboo pieces instantly is a thing every devotee buys from the temple to his home to be hung there for a year. Here is a shop selling the same.

The Kottiyoor Pilgrimage has far reaching participation from the entire society. The Hindu communities in the region bring the raw materials as a ritual each year from even more than a hundred of kilometer away by walking. Each community have been delegated specific duty by the Kottayam (Pazhassi) royal family, and has not been re-delegated from the inception. They consider this as a right given to them and exercise their part as a duty. This has been happening as a ritual for ages and is centuries of years old tradition. The pilgrimage has become a part of their culture. The temple is located in a serene dense forest which is now declared as a Wild Life Sanctuary by Government of Kerala.

The rites and rituals of the festival is a symbol of Shaiva-Vaishnava-shakteya communal harmony. Rohini Aradhana is considered one of the sacred rituals during the Vysakha Mahotsavam where the head of the Vaishnavite family named 'Kurumathoor', conduct 'Aalingana pushpanjali' to the Swayambhoo linga, this is to commemorate Vishnu embracing Shiva to pacify him, who was in deep sorrow when he found the burned dead body of his beloved wife Sati Devi.

=== Thruchherumana Temple origin ===
The 'Prathishta'(i.e. the installation of idol) of the Thruchherumana Temple, was done by Parashurama on the opposite river bank of the Swayambhuu linga. The Thruchherumana Temple has its objective to worship Shiva for the entire year as the Swayambhoo linga on the other bank of the river can only be worshiped during 27 days of a year. Sankaracharya had classified the rites and rituals of the temple. He came to the Thruchherumana temple and worshiped there but he did not cross the river and worshiped the Swayambhoo linga as it was not the period of Vysakha pilgrimage. This belief is strictly followed until this time, of not going to the premises of Swayambhoo linga, or Akkare kottiyoor, if it is not the Vysakha pilgrimage time. Sankaracharya made ablutions in the Vavali river and prayed from the west bank of the river without crossing and continued his journey.

== Legends ==
A pious Namboothiri of Kalakkatt Illam (one of the four major Mantravada (Sorcery) lineages of Kerala) was returning from Kottiyoor. To pray for Sandhya vandanam in Manathana Shrine he took bath in the pond, after which a young lady from the adjacent bay offered him Taali (herbal shampoo), and told that she would apply it onto his forehead. He immediately recognized that she was none other than Bhadrakali and showing his head would mean his death. He folded his hand in front of her and said any thing given by The Mother is nectar. He took the shampoo and drank it. Devi was pleased with him and presented him with three sacred insignia which he installed in three temples in the Kannur region.

== Associations with other Temples ==
The Puffed rice (Pori or Malaru) is prepared at "Pullancheri Illam", and handed over to the temple from Narasimhaswamy temple, Pala, near Muzhakunnu Kottiyoor Temple is also closely associated with the Tirunelli MahaVishnu Temple in Wayanad District, about 54 km from Kotttiyoor It was from Tirunelli that rice was given to Kottiyoor for Vysakha Mahotsavam and returned after the festival. This has been discontinued but rites are performed in both temples to continue the tradition. It is believed that Bhuta Ganas carry the presents of Tirunelli Perumal to Vysakha Mahotsavam. Once a Bhuta tried to steal a present and the Perumal cursed him to become a rock. The Sacred sword of Veerabhadra is brought for the Kottiyoor Festival from "Mutherikavu" a nearby temple.

Tons of firewood are used for the Kottiyoor festival in the shrine. Not even for a single year until now has it been required to remove the excess ash from the altar. All the essentials needed for Ammarakkal Tara is brought from Manathana shrine. Sacred swords also come from Chapparam Bhagavathi temple. Pooja vessels, ornaments etc., come from Karimbanagopuram.

== Rites and Rituals schedule ==
Present day rituals of Kottiyoor were set out by Sri Shankaracharya. With his spiritual vision, he felt the presence of Shiva at 'Akkare Kottiyoor' and not willing to pollute the holy ground with the touch of his feet, prayed from 'Ekkare Kottiyoor' and left.

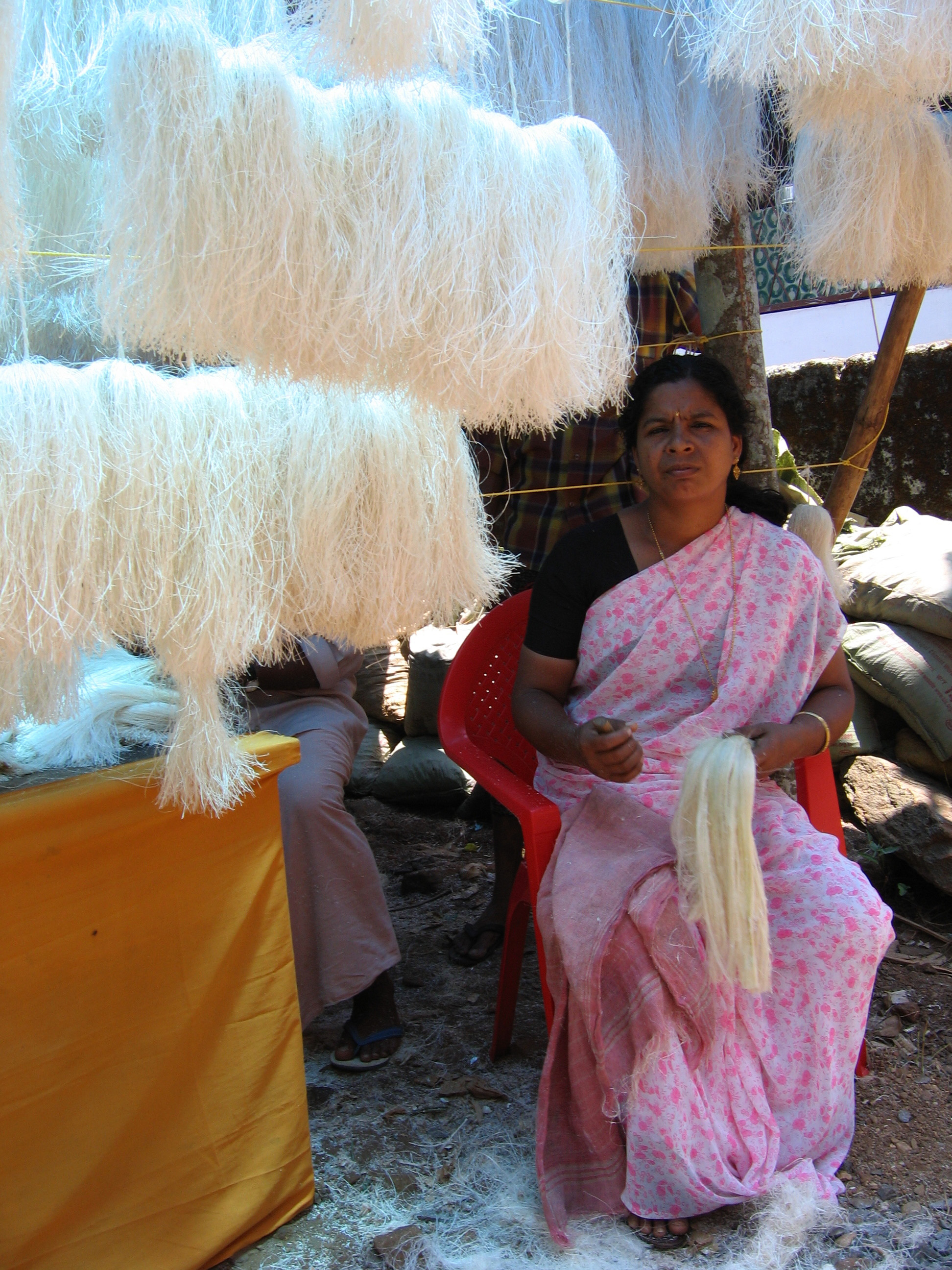
Bamboo flower maker

The Vaisakha Maholsavam festival is held every year during the months of May - June. The twenty eight-day festival commences with the 'Neyyattam' ritual on the 'chodi' Day in Edavam (rishabham) and concludes with the Thrikkalashaattu. The Vaisakha Maholsavam celebrations begin with the ritual of bringing a sword from Muthirerikavu from Wayanad. On the following day, on Visakham star, Bhandaram Ezhunnallath ritual is held. Ornaments and Pooja vessels of pure gold and silver are brought from the nearby Manathana village to Kottiyoor.

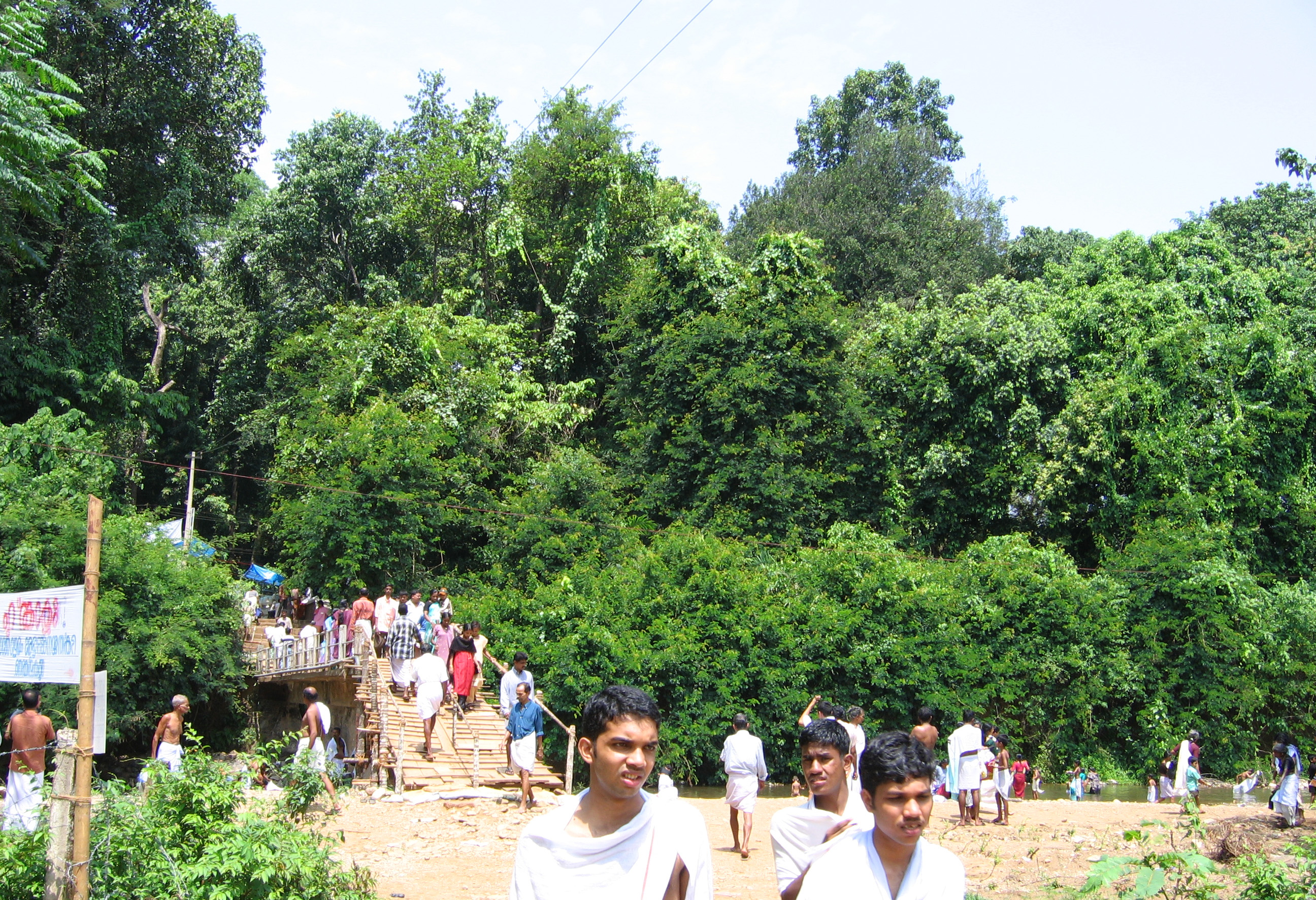
The bridge

An important ritual during the festival is the 'Elaneer Vayppu' or submitting tender coconuts before the swayambhu Shiva linga. On this special day, thousands of tender coconuts carried from different parts of Kerala by the devotees are submitted. The following day, the Namboothiris of the temple collect water from tender coconuts in pure gold and silver pots and then the Chief Priest pours the collected coconut water on to the idol in what is known as 'Elaneeraattam', also called the 'Rashi velli'. Rohini Aaradhana is a very important ritual which is not seen in any other temple. Kurumathur Brahman (The senior most member of Kurumathur family considered the embodiment of Vishnu in the ritual) embraces the swayambhu Shiva linga as part of the ritual. This is symbolic of Vishnu pacifying Shiva Who is saddened by the loss of Sati.

As a part of the festival, a procession (Ezhunnallippu) is held with two elephants carrying the idols of Shiva and Parvathi. After the procession, the elephants are fed well (Aanayootu) and given a formal farewell.

The 'Thammangadan Nambiar' Family (The Vediyara Chandrothu Family), a sub-branch of the Thiruvithamkur/Kolathiri Royal Family), used to (and still do) have by tradition, exclusive right to being the first to have their Ghee offered to the Deity for 'Abhishekam', during the "Naallam Thurakkal" ritual, at the Kottiyur Shiva Temple, believed to be the site for the famous Yajna of Daksha. "Villippalan Kurup" is the name, by which the member of this Family, performing the ghee-offering ritual is known.

== Temple Dress code ==
Men: Traditional Mundu, Shirt and Banian allowed. Lungi not allowed. Women: Salwar Kameez Allowed, Saree, Set Mundu, Skirts and Blouse allowed.

== Access ==
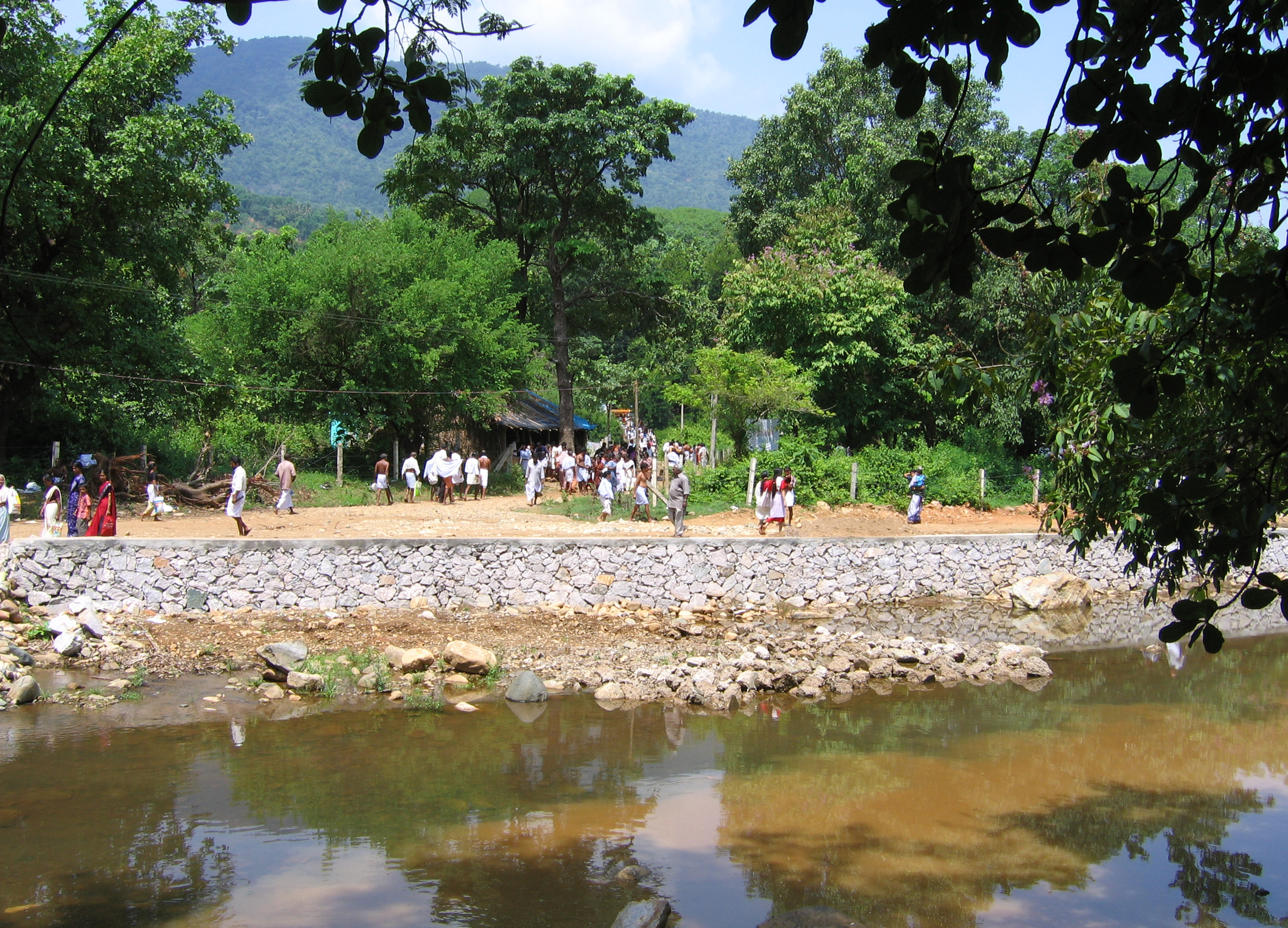
Going to Akkare Kottiyoor

The national highway passes through Kannur town. Mangalore and Mumbai can be accessed on the northern side and Cochin and Thiruvananthapuram can be accessed on the southern side. The road to the east of Iritty connects to Mysore and Bangalore. The nearest railway station is Kannur on Mangalore-Palakkad line. There are airports at Kannur, Thiruvananthapuram, Mangalore, Calicut and Cochin.

Palchuram

- Ambayathode
- Kottiyoor
- Kottiyoor Vysakha Mahotsavam
- Thalassery
- St.Sebastian's Church, Kottiyoor
