= Ambayathode =

- Village
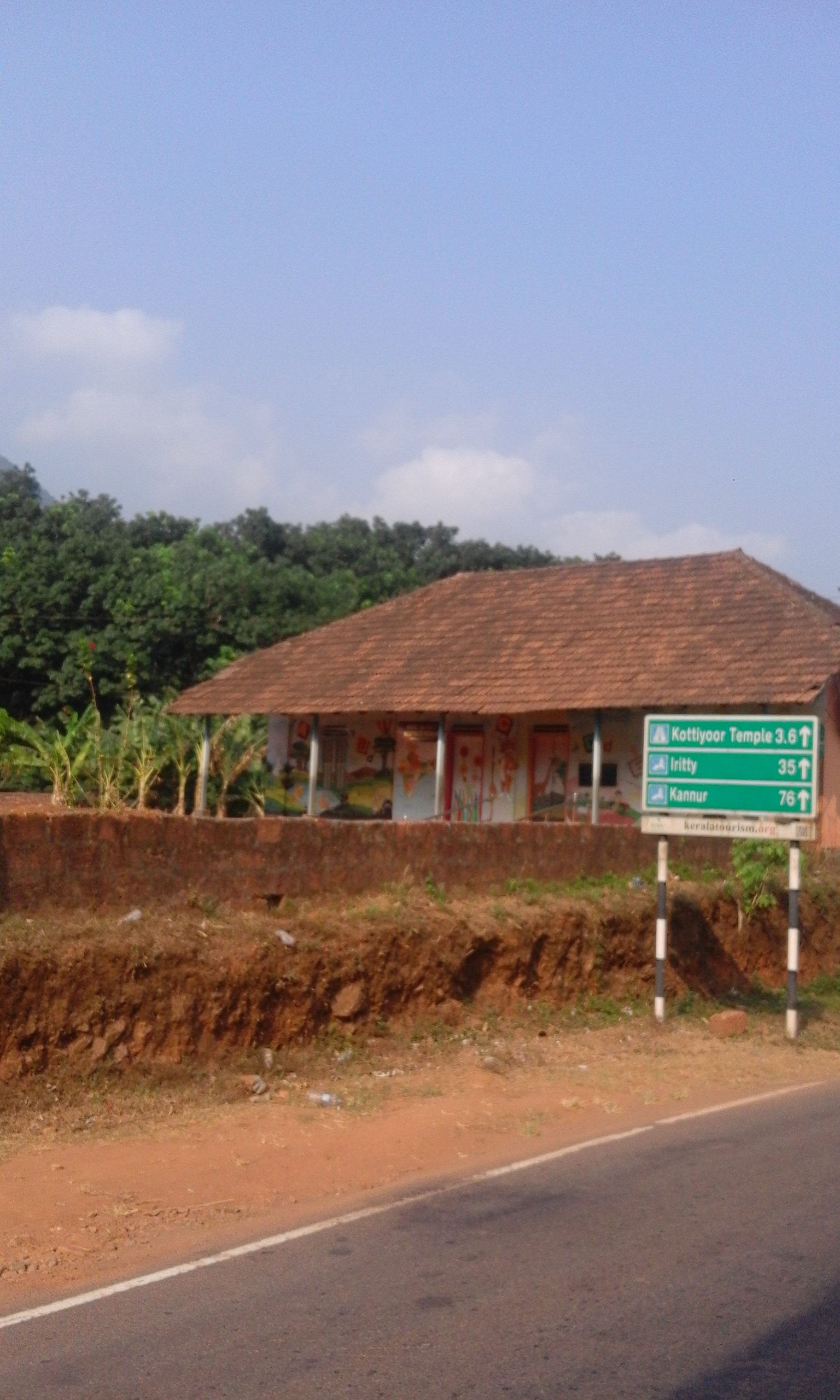
- St.George School, Ambayathode

- Location in Kerala, India Ambayathode (India)
- Coordinates: 11.86464°N 75.88982°E
- Country: India
- State: Kerala
- District: Kannur

Government
  - Body: Kottiyoor Grama Panchayat

Languages
  - Official: Malayalam, English
- Time zone: UTC+5:30 (IST)
- PIN: 670651
- Telephone code: 0490
- Vehicle registration: KL 78
- Niyamasabha constituency: Peravoor
- Lok Sabha constituency: Kannur

Ambayathode is a hilly village near to Kottiyoor temple in the Kannur district of Kerala, India. Ambayathodu witnessed massive landslides during Kerala Floods 2018.

== Location ==
Ambayathode is located between Boys Town in Wayanad district and Kottiyoor in Kannur district. The town is the entry point for visitors to Kottiyoor temple from the Bangalore side.

== Attractions ==
Ambayathode is very scenic and less crowded than Kottiyoor. There are five hairpin bends down from Boys Town to reach Ambayathode. The first landmark is a big church being built in memory of Father Chavara. There is a library dedicated to the memory of E.M.S.Namboodiripad.

- There is another beautiful church called St.Mary's Orthodox church part of the Malankara Orthodox Syrian Church.
- There is a Pentecostal church of the Assemblies of God community.

== Education ==
There are two schools called St. George LP School and Ambayathode UP School.

== Economy ==
The people are mostly farmers. Milk is a major product. There is a milk society here run by the cooperative society of shepherds.

== Transport ==
The national highway passes through Kannur town. Mangalore and Mumbai can be accessed on the northern side and Cochin and Thiruvananthapuram can be accessed on the southern side. The road to the east of Iritty connects to Mysore and Bangalore. The nearest railway station is Thalassery on Mangalore–Palakkad line. There are airports at Kannur, Mangalore and Calicut.

== Gallery ==
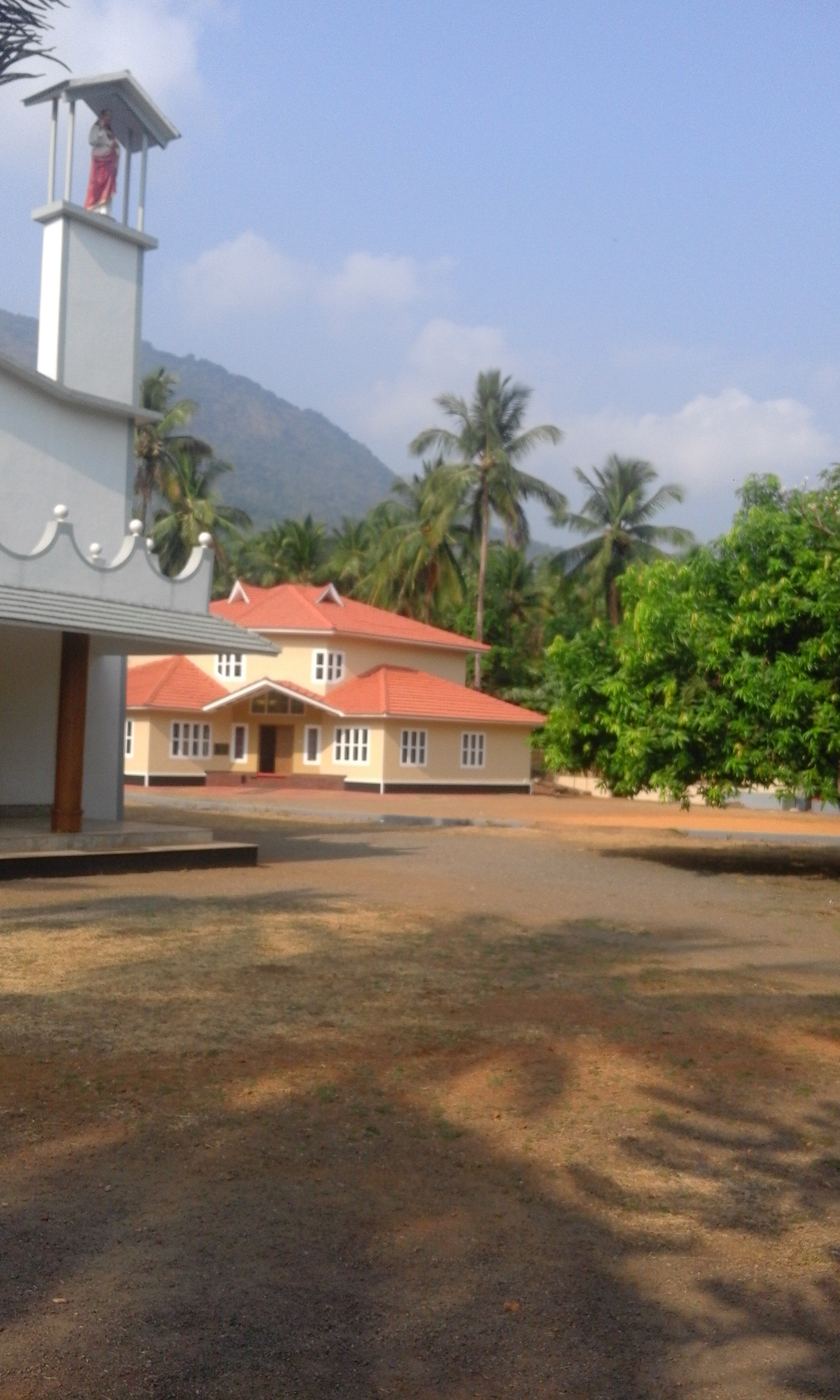
Ambayathode Church

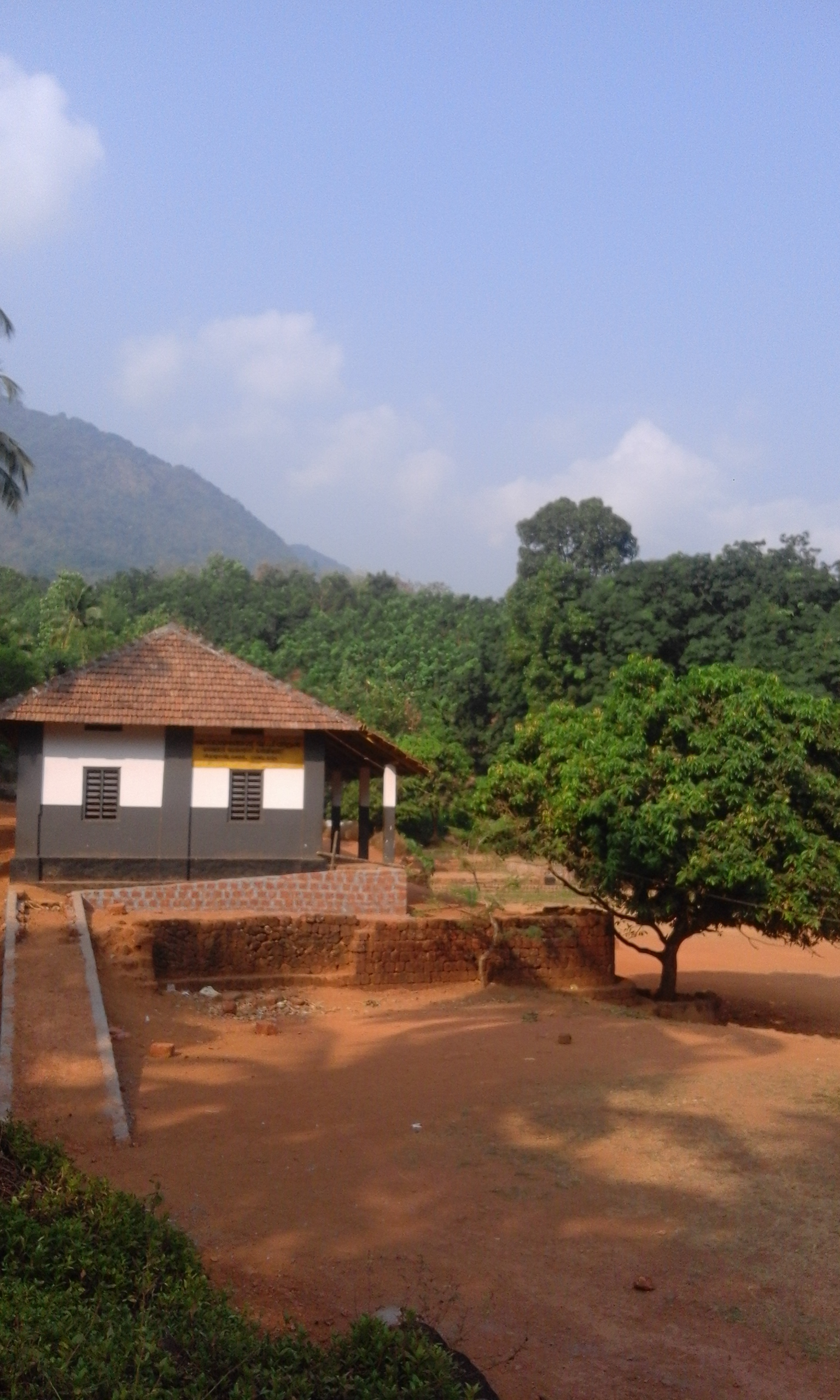
Ambayathode School
