= Kottiyoor =

Village in Kerala, India

Kottiyoor Kottiyur
- Village
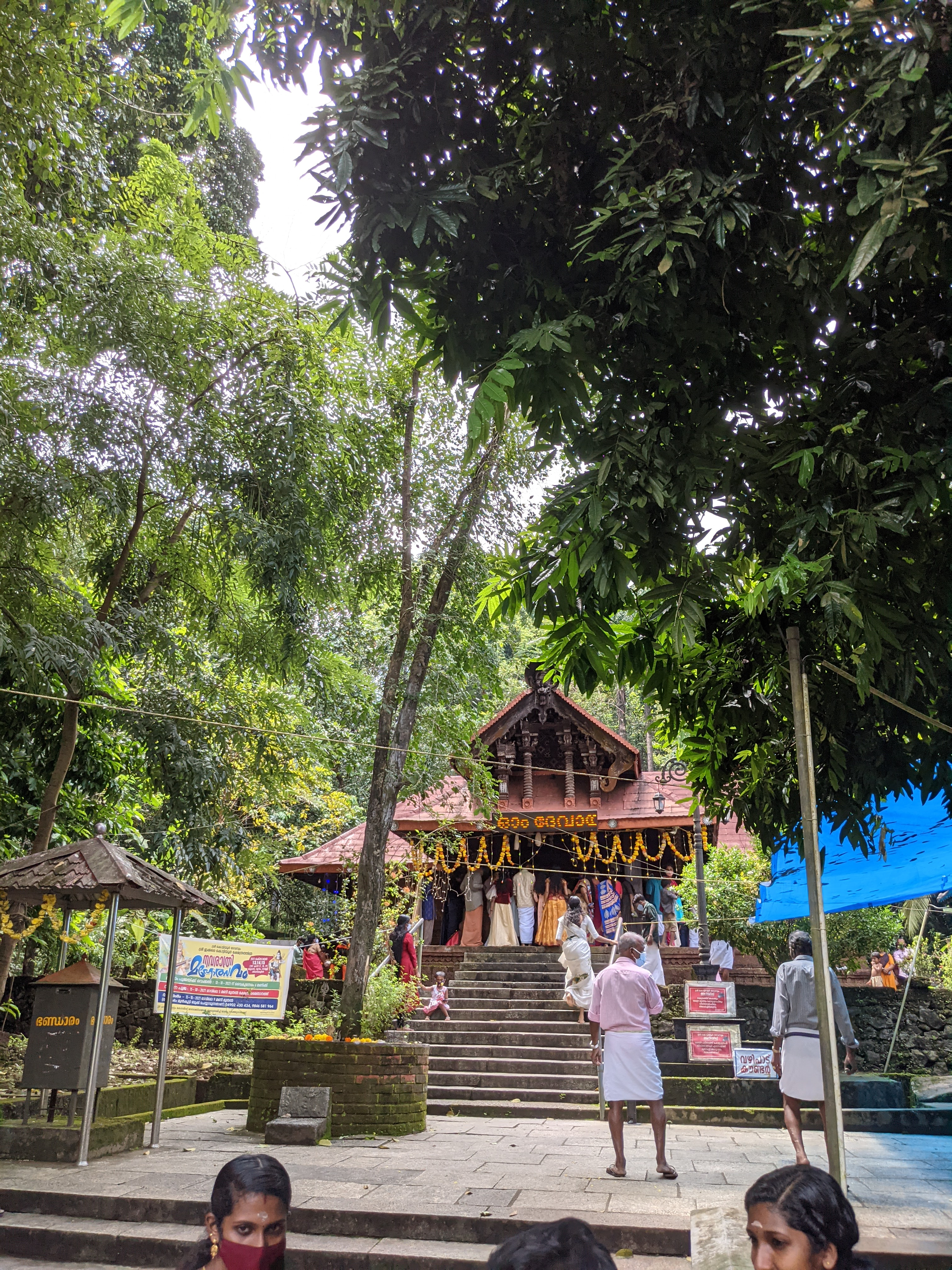
- Ikkare Kottiyoor temple

- Location in Kannur, Kerala, India
- Coordinates: 11°52′35″N 75°51′15″E
- Country: India
- State: Kerala
- District: Kannur

Government
  - Type: Panchayati raj (India)
  - Body: Kottiyoor Grama Panchayat

Area
  - Total: 155.01 km^{2} (59.85 sq mi)

Population
  - Total: 16,698
  - Density: 107.72/km^{2} (279.00/sq mi)

Languages
  - Official: Malayalam, English
- Time zone: UTC+5:30 (IST)
- PIN: 670651
- Telephone code: 0490
- Vehicle registration: KL-78
- Niyamasabha constituency: Peravoor
- Climate: Pleasant (Köppen)

Kottiyoor is a village and gram panchayat in the easterly hills of Kannur district in Kerala state. Kottiyoor is the twenty third wildlife sanctuary of Kerala, located in the hills of Western Ghats. The ancient pilgrimage conducted here yearly, called 'Kottiyoor Vysakha Mahotsavam', attracts around 50,000 devotees every year. The Bavali river flows through Kottiyoor.

== Toponymy ==
Kottiyoor comes from Koodi (Meeting) and Uuru (Precinct); the name comes from the pilgrimage in the region. In mythology, this is the place where the holy trinity (Brahma, Vishnu and Shiva), Veerabhadra, Bhadrakali, Shiva Bhutaganas, revered Sages and other holy men came together to complete the Daksha Yaga. It is believed that Sati Devi immolated herself here.

== Geography ==
Kottiyoor is a hilly village on the eastern side of Kannur district. The terrain is undulating in nature and the extreme eastern side has forests bordering Karnataka state.

== Demographics ==
As of 2011 Census, Kottiyoor village had population of 16,698 which constitutes 8,239 males and 8,459 females. Kottiyoor village spreads over an area of 155.01 km^{2} (59.85 sq mi) with 4,156 families residing in it. The sex ratio of Kottiyoor was 1,027 lower than state average of 1,084. Population of children in the age group 0-6 was 1,568 (9.4%) where 786 are males and 782 are females. Kottiyoor had an overall literacy of 94.8% higher than state average of 94%. The male literacy stands at 95.8% and female literacy was 93.9%.

== Biodiversity ==
Kottiyoor is a part of the northern Western Ghats, (WWF code IM0135), it is classified as a tropical broad leaf forest. The region is a transition zone between the moist Cullenia-dominated forest in south to drier Dipterocarp forests in north. The region is classified under Critical biodiversity hot spot. The Kottiyoor forest is a part of Nilgiri Biosphere Reserve. Kottiyoor is connected to Wayanad through the Brahmagiri valley which is rich in wild flora and fauna.

=== Kottiyoor Wildlife Sanctuary ===
Kottiyoor Wildlife Sanctuary in Kottiyoor is declared as a wild life sanctuary by the Government of Kerala in 2011. It is the 23rd wild life sanctuary in Kerala. The total area of the zone is 3,037.98 hectares. It well-known sanctuary in Kannur District. Kottiyoor Wild Life Sanctuary is adjacent to the Bandipur National Park, a tiger reserve park in Karnataka border.

== Tourism ==
Kottiyoor is a tourist spot for biologists, nature sight seers and mountaineering trekkers. Neendunokki, Palukachiyamala, Chappumala, Pannyamala, and Kelakam are all serene green places suitable for eco-tourism. The forest has a large variety of birds and seasonal butterflies. Palukachipara's hilltop is a known location for usual trekkers'.

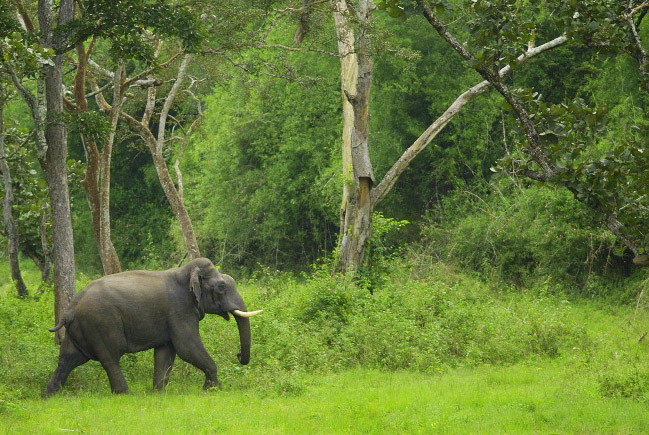
Tusker in Forest

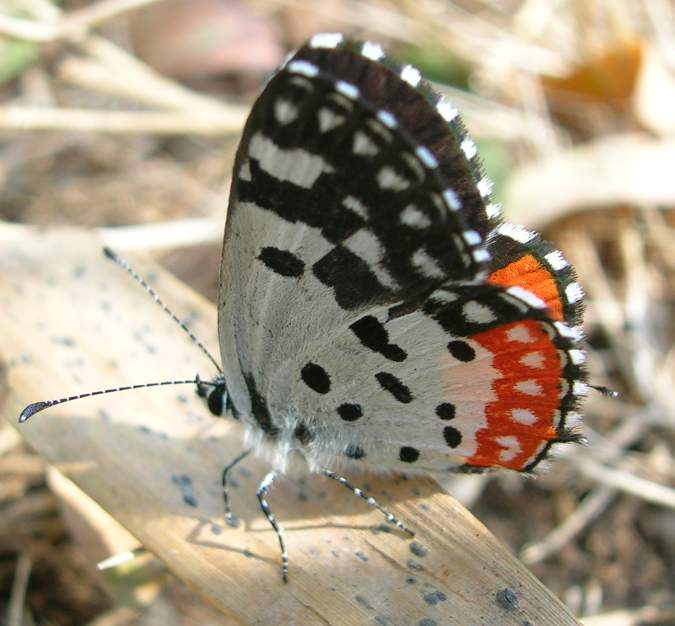
Seasonal Butterfly

=== Pilgrimage ===
Kottiyoor Utsavam, the yaga festival in Akkare Kottiyoor Shrine, is conducted yearly for 27 days commemorating the Daksha Yaga. The pilgrimage is on the west bank of Bavali river in a temporary shrine where the Swayambhu linga is present. During the time of pilgrimage the Ikkare Kottiyoor Temple will be closed. Thousands of pilgrims come to this place, the festival is in the rainy season of June–July.

== Thruchherumana Temple (Kottiyoor Vadakkeshwaram Temple) ==
The Thruchherumana Temple or familiarly known as Ikkare Kottiyoor Kshetram is a prominent Shiva Temple, located on the east bank of Vavali river. It special category temple of Malabar Devaswom Board. The temple is mainly famous due to the yearly pilgrimage of Vysakha Mahotsavam in the other shrine on the west bank. The temple is closed during the Vysakha mahotsavam and open during the rest of the year.

== Access ==
The national highway passes through Kannur town. Mangalore and Mumbai can be accessed on the northern side and Cochin and Thiruvananthapuram can be accessed on the southern side. The road to the east of Iritty connects to Mysore and Bangalore. The nearest railway station is Thalassery railway station on Mangalore-Palakkad line. There are airports at Mangalore and Kannur. There are road access from Kannur and Thalassery. From Kannur the route is through Chalode, Mattannur and Iritty:Another route is Koothuparamba-Nedumpoil-Kolakkad-Kelakam. Other route is Mattanur-Shivapuram-Maloor-Peravoor; from Thalassery the route is through Koothuparamba. Akkare Kottiyoor temple is open during the annual festival for one month whereas the Ikkare Kottiyoor temple is open for 11 months.

- Road: Frequent bus services are available to Kottiyoor from Thalassery and Iritty.

Kottiyyor is 125 km from Kozhikode

- Rail: the nearest railway station is Thalassery 55 km
- Airport:Kannur International Airport, Mattannur.

== Image gallery ==
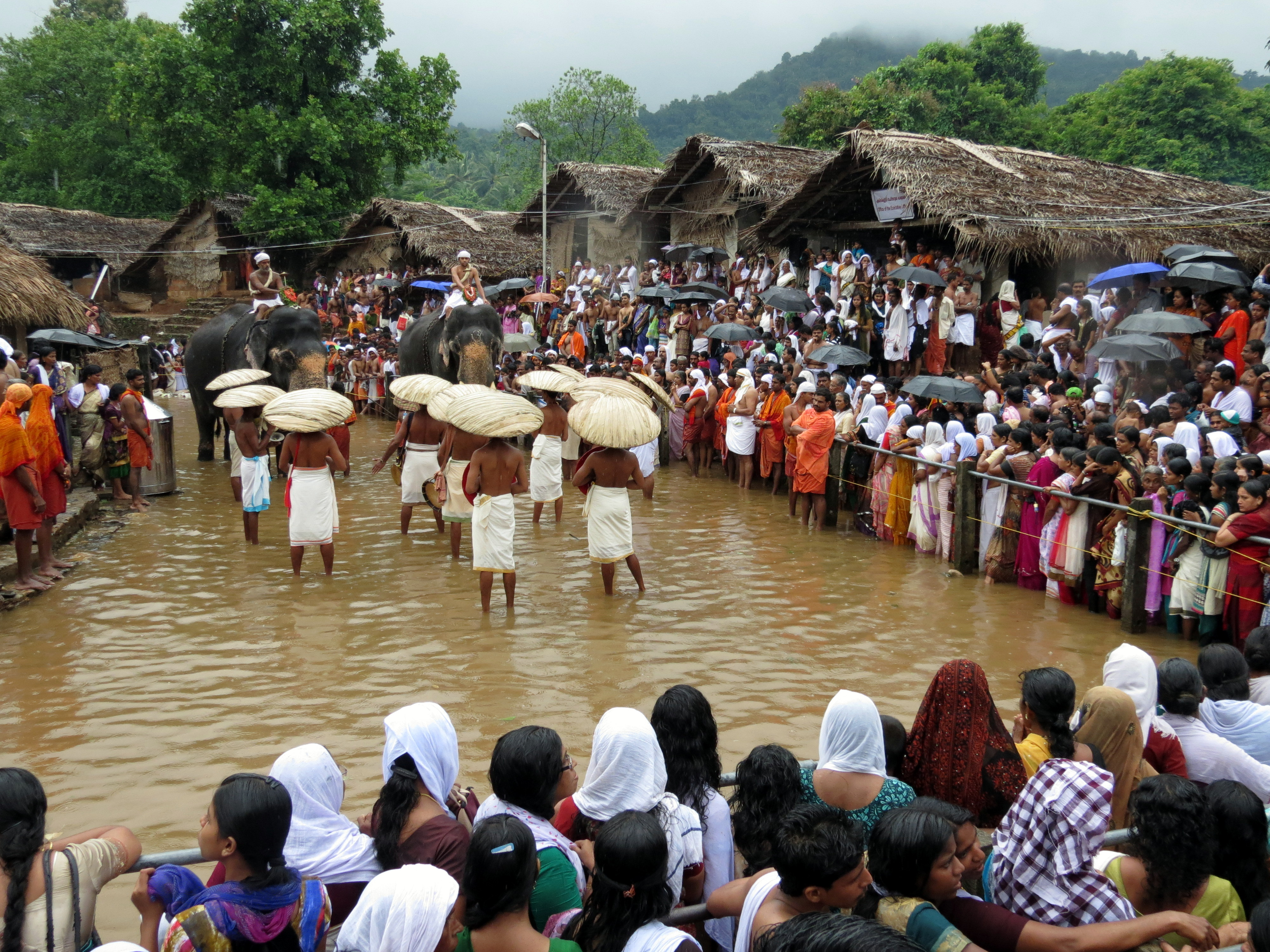
Festival Time

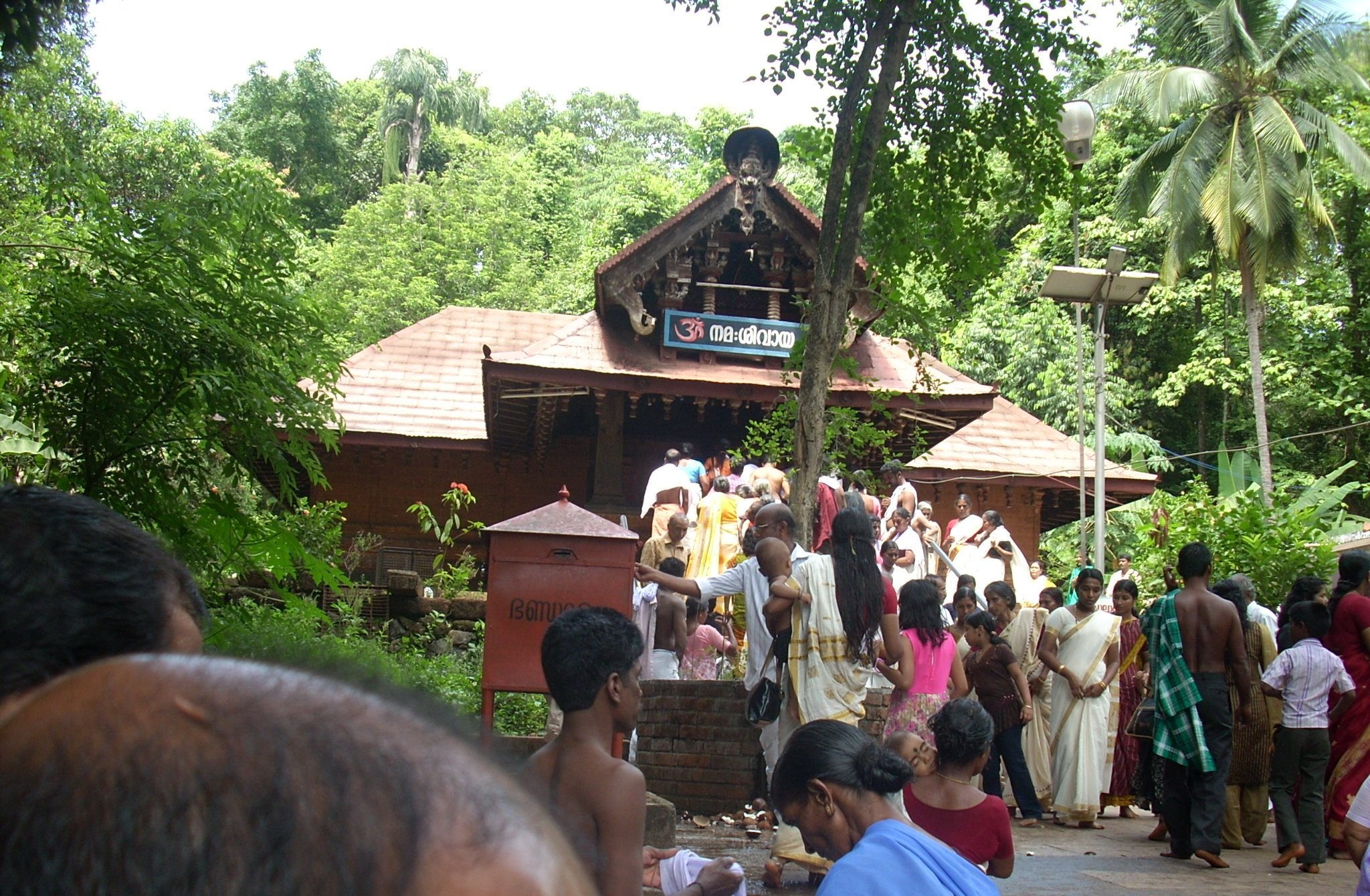
Ikkare Kottiyur

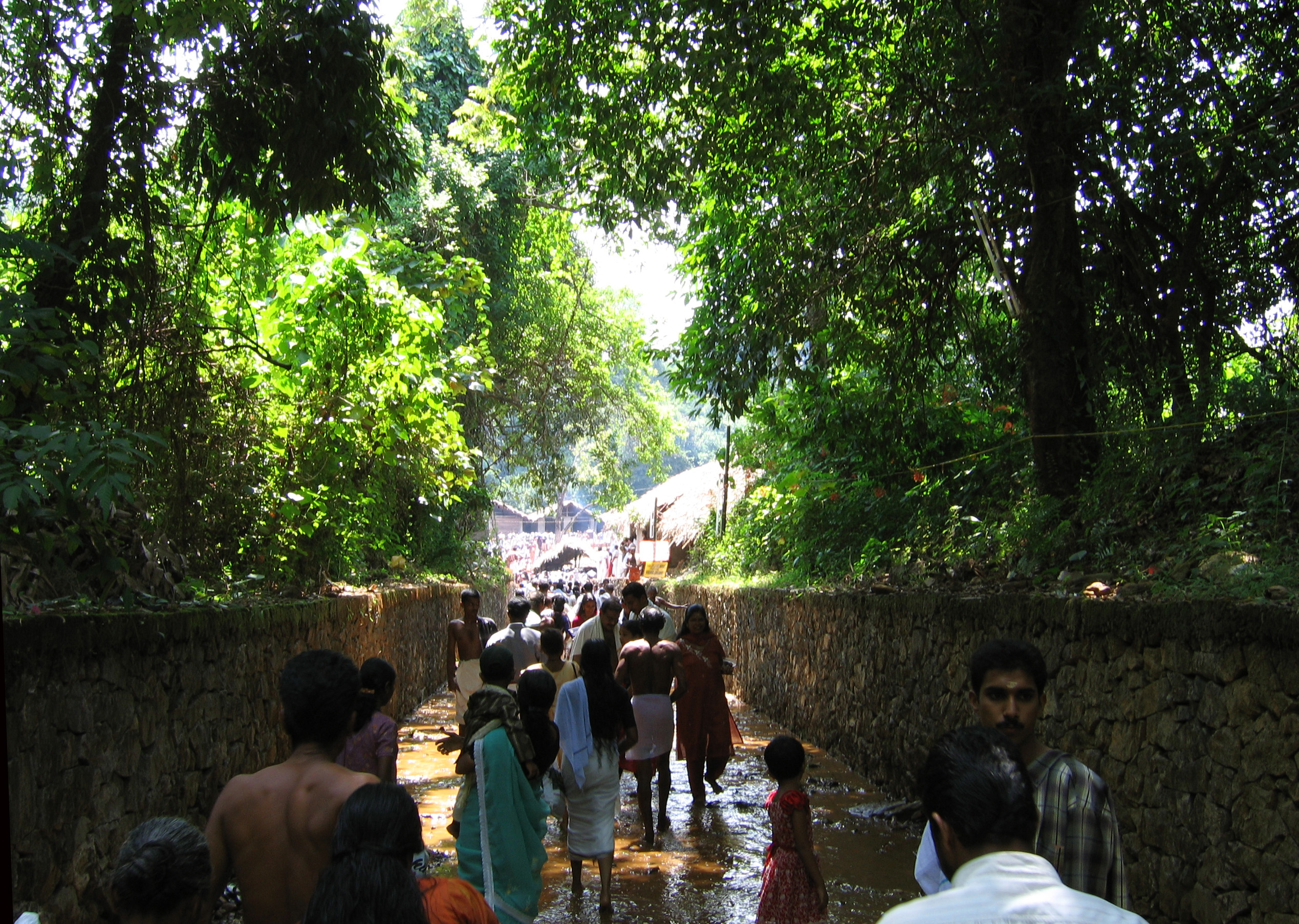
Entry to Akkare

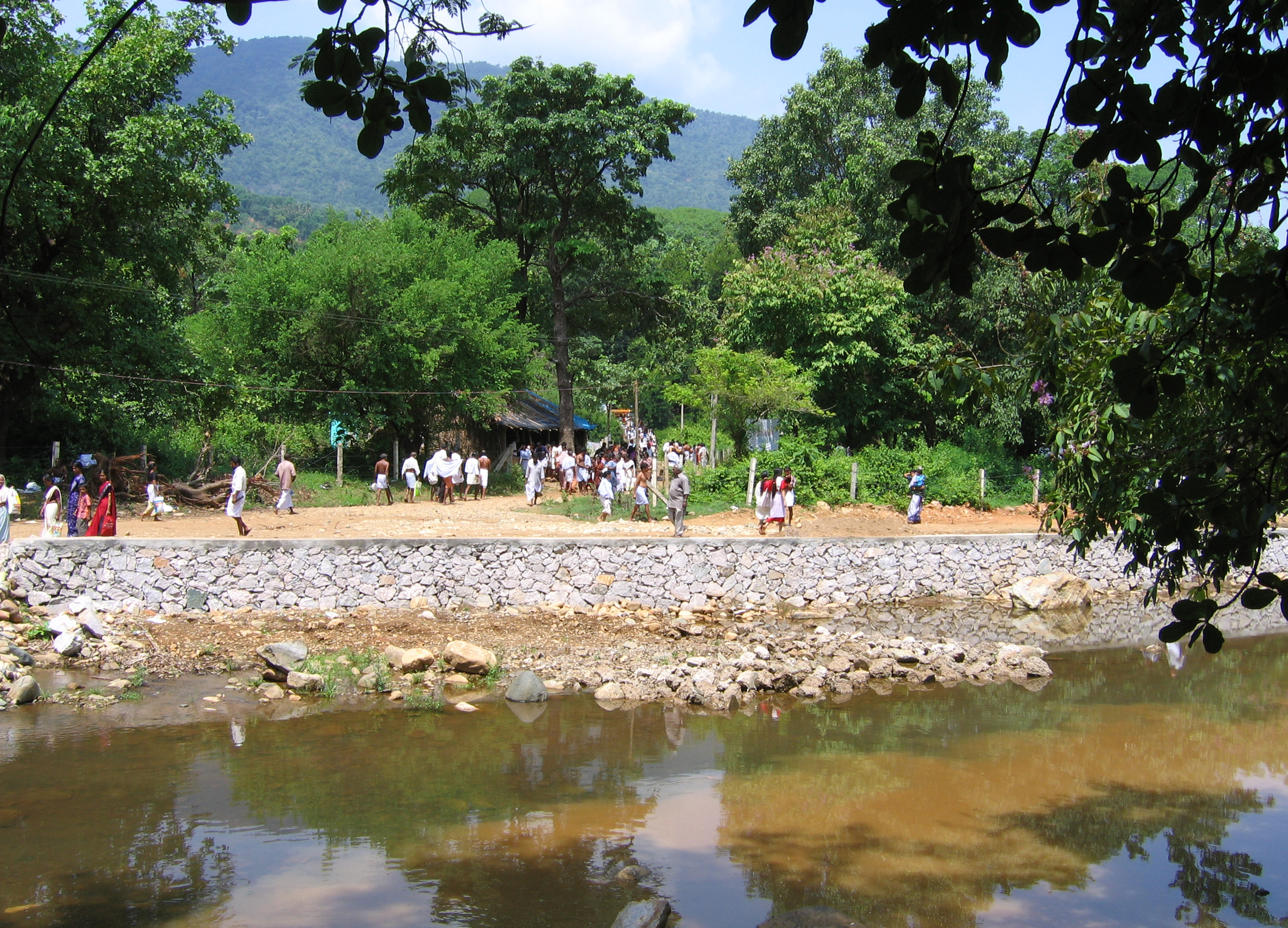
Going to Akkare Kottiyur

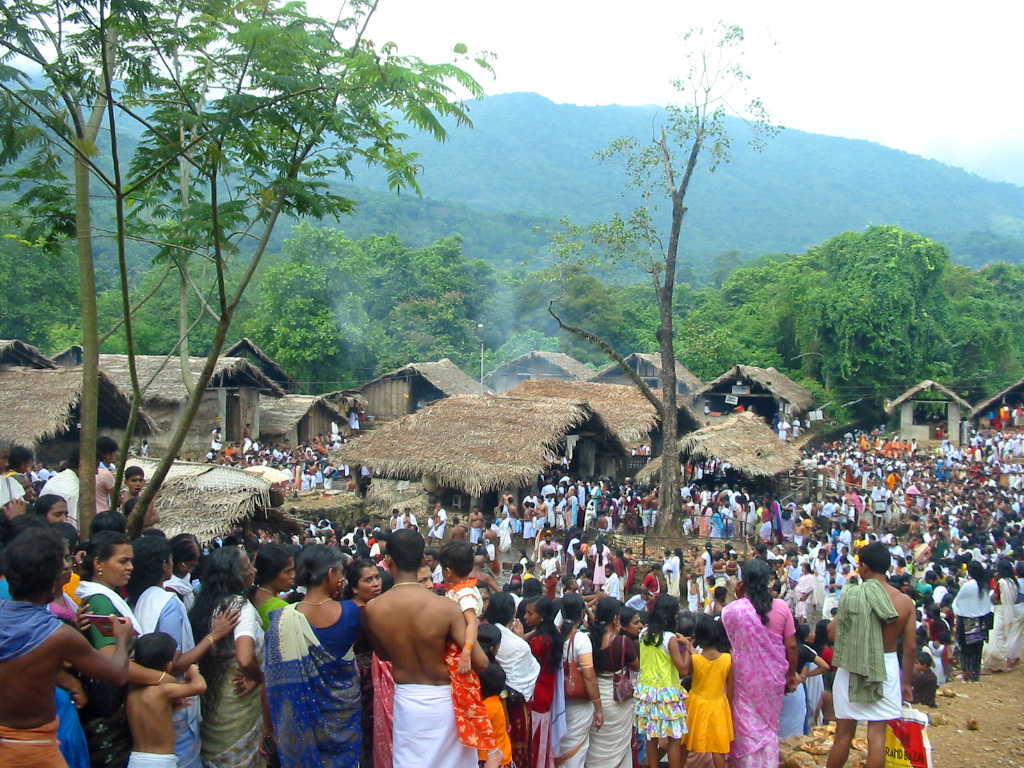
festival view

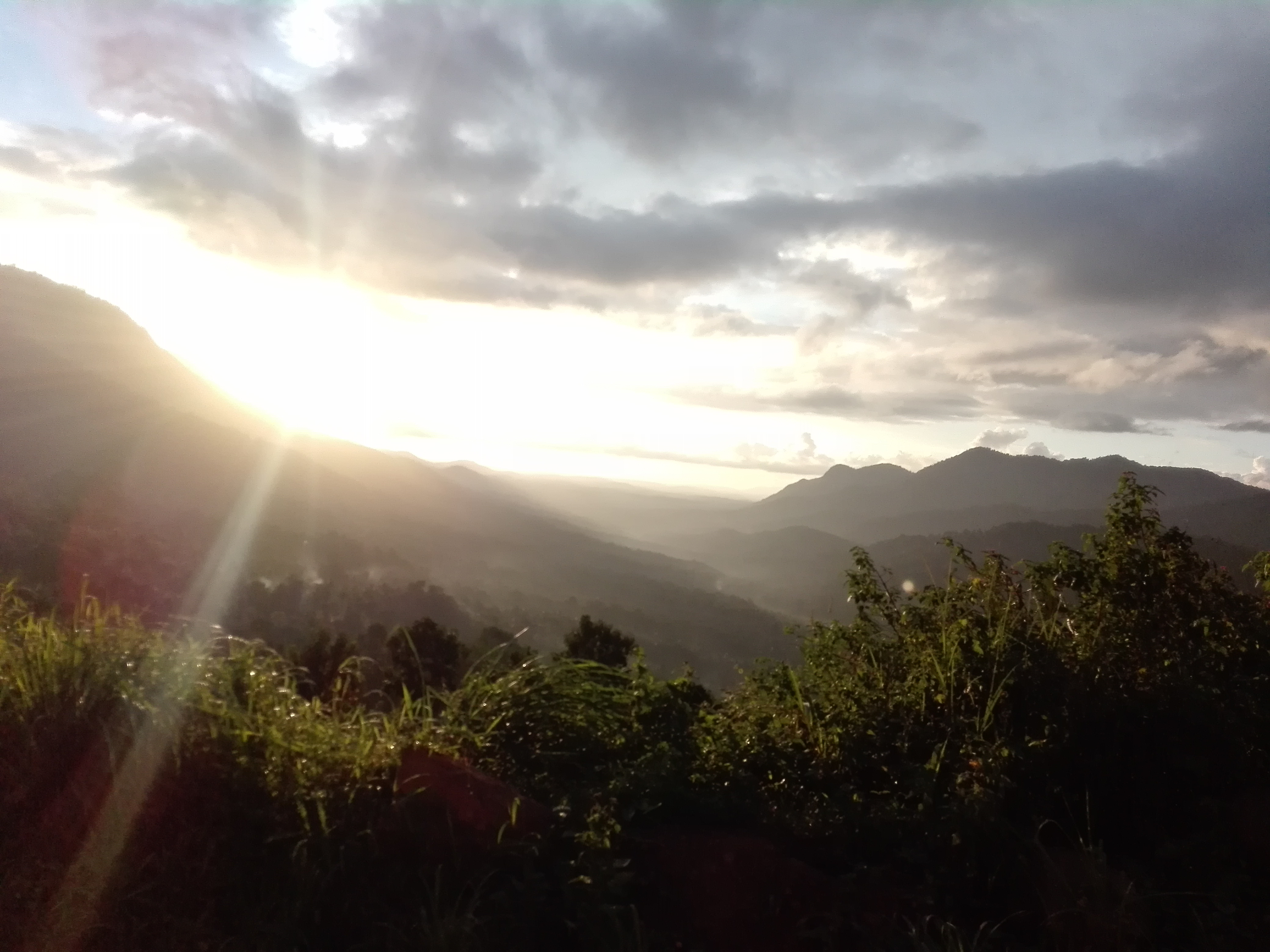
Palchuram, Kottiyoor

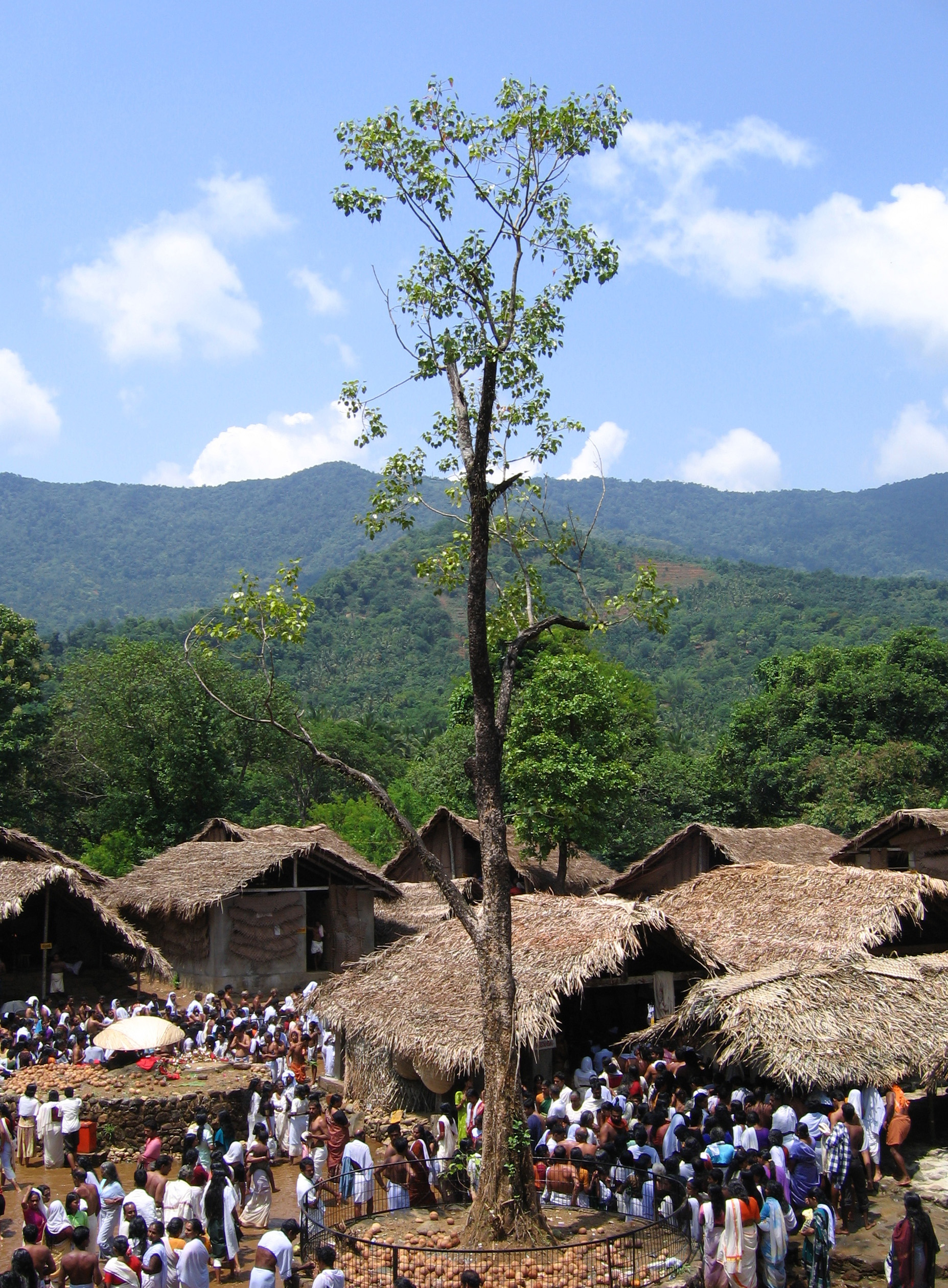
The Bunyan Tree

== See also ==
- Kottiyoor Temple
- Kottiyoor Vysakha Mahotsavam
- Thalassery
- Mattannur
- Ambayathode
- Chungakkunnu
- Kottiyoor Honey
