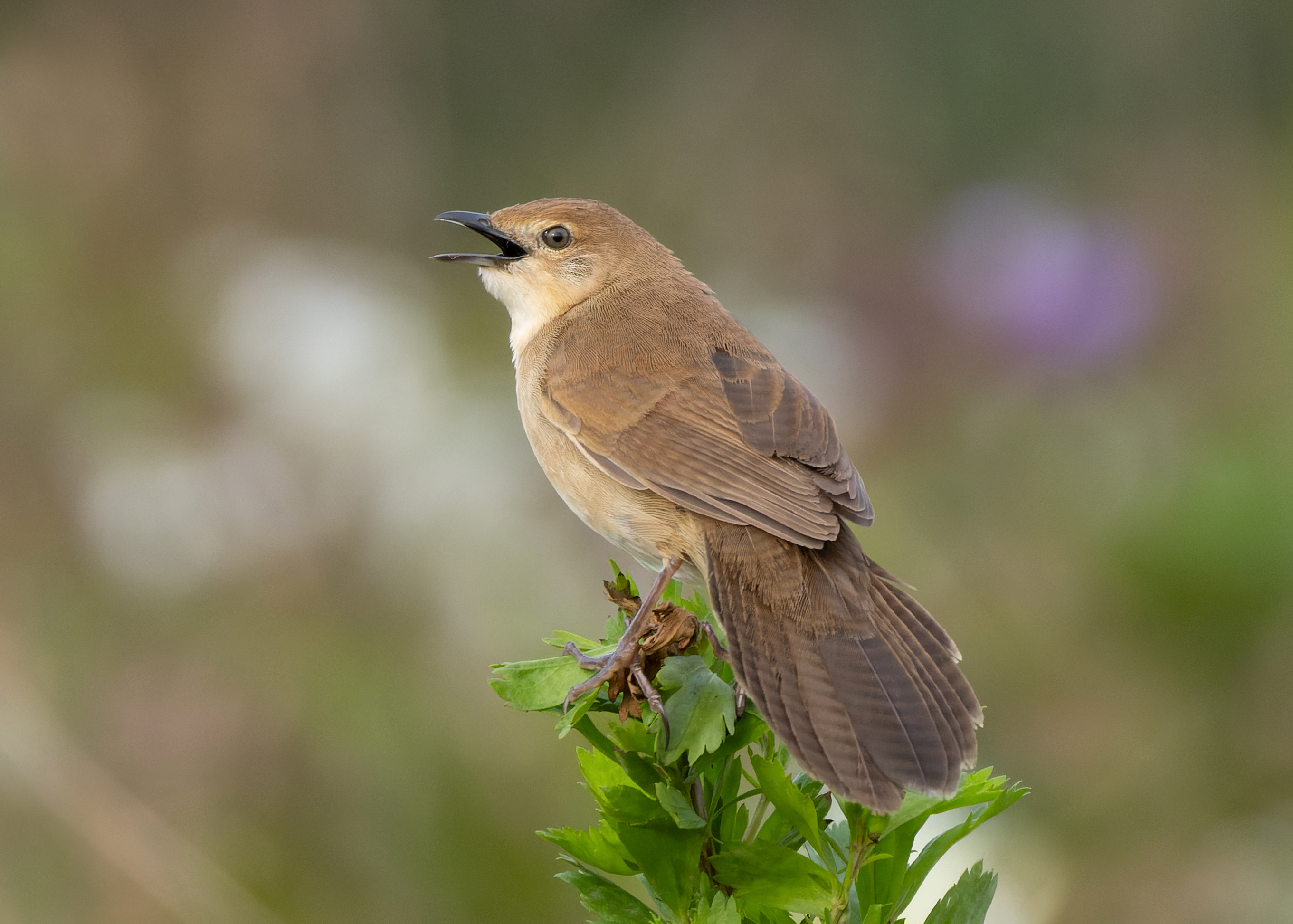
- Schoenicola platyurus in Maharashtra, India.

Conservation status
- Near Threatened (IUCN 3.1)

Scientific classification
- Kingdom: Animalia
- Phylum: Chordata
- Class: Aves
- Order: Passeriformes
- Family: Locustellidae
- Genus: Schoenicola
- Species: S. platyurus

Binomial name
- Schoenicola platyurus (Jerdon, 1841)

Synonyms
- Timalia platyura

= Broad-tailed grassbird =

Species of bird

Broad-tailed grassbird call recorded in Koottanad, Kerala

The broad-tailed grassbird (Schoenicola platyurus) is a species of Old World warbler in the family Locustellidae. It is endemic to the Western Ghats of India with a possibility of occurrence in Sri Lanka. A small, mostly brown bird, it has a broad rounded and graduated tail. It is found only on the higher altitude grassy hills where it usually skulks, except during the breeding season when males fly up into the air to sing in their display. The species is believed to be a resident although it is possible that they make local movements.

== Description ==
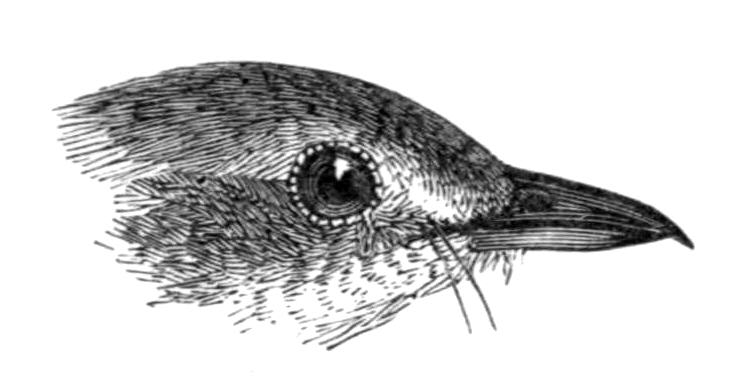
Head showing the short bill and the two rictal bristles

The uniform brown upperparts with a broad, round-tipped and long graduated tail are distinctive features of this bird. The species has a buff supercilium and the brown tail has thin dark bars. The underside of the tail is very dark and the feathers are tipped with white. Males and females are indistinguishable in plumage. The call of the male during breeding is a lark-like and repeated trill that is accompanied by fanned tail and a fluttering flight. Other calls include a chack and a zink note. The gape colour is black and visible in singing males but is brown in females. In the non-breeding season, it is a skulker moving rapidly between grass and reeds but sometimes perching in the open.

== Taxonomy and systematics ==
The species has in former times included the African Schoenicola brevirostris, which was originally called Catriscus apicalis and later Schoenicola platyura brevirostris. The Indian species was first described by Thomas C. Jerdon who found the bird at the base of the Gudalur ghat in the foothills of the Nilgiris. The bill is short and strong with the culmen slightly curved, and there are two rictal bristles. The tarsus is somewhat long for the proportions. The populations north and south of the Palghat gap are said to differ in plumage shade: the northern form being larger, paler and greyer above with the flanks sandy-brown; the southern form is dark rufous brown above and more whitish below with bright buff on the breast and flanks. This plumage variation was earlier believed to be seasonal. Molecular phylogeny studies place the genus in the warbler subfamily Megalurinae along with Megalurus, Chaetornis and Graminicola. A study of the group shows that the African S. brevirostris and S. platyurus are not closely related and that S. platyurus is a sister of Chaetornis striata.

== Distribution ==
The broad-tailed grassbird is restricted to grassy moist highlands, principally in the Western Ghats of southern India mainly south of Karnataka but with some records from Pune, Lonavala and Nashik. A specimen was collected by S. A. Hussain at Point Calimere that suggests that the bird may be involved in local movements or migrations, possibly into Sri Lanka. Suggestions that it may occur in Sri Lanka are as yet not well supported; there is an old specimen and doubtfully identified by Colonel Legge and two unconfirmed sight records from Gammaduwa, Matale Hills, and Waitalawa, Rangala Hills.

== Behaviour and ecology ==
The breeding season appears to be from March to May, but nests have been seen in July and September, so the raising of two broods is suspected. The nest is a ball of coarse grass blades with an entrance on the side and placed low in a tussock of long grass. The eggs are white with spots and blotches of brownish red. The usual clutch is 2 or 3 eggs. It feeds on insects.
