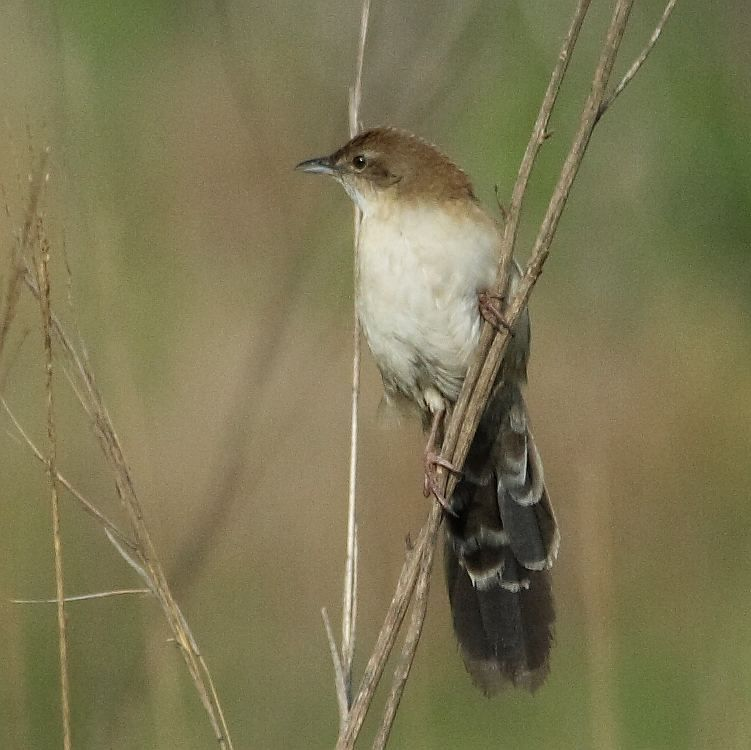
- near Pietermaritzburg, Kwa-Zulu Natal, South Africa

Conservation status
- Least Concern (IUCN 3.1)

Scientific classification
- Kingdom: Animalia
- Phylum: Chordata
- Class: Aves
- Order: Passeriformes
- Family: Locustellidae
- Genus: Catriscus; Cabanis, 1851
- Species: C. brevirostris

Binomial name
- Catriscus brevirostris (Sundevall, 1850)

Synonyms
- Catriscus apicalis Schoenicola brevirostris

= Fan-tailed grassbird =

Species of bird

The fan-tailed grassbird or broad-tailed warbler (Catriscus brevirostris) is an African species of Old World warbler in the family Locustellidae. The species is closely related to the broad-tailed grassbird of India, and is sometimes treated as the same species, although a 2018 study found that it and the broad-tailed grassbird were not closely related, with the Indian species being a sister of Chaetornis striata.

The species has a discontinuous distribution across Africa, and is found in Angola, Burundi, Cameroon, Republic of the Congo, Democratic Republic of the Congo, Eswatini, Equatorial Guinea, Ethiopia, Gabon, Guinea, Kenya, Malawi, Mozambique, Nigeria, Rwanda, Sierra Leone, South Africa, South Sudan, Tanzania, Uganda, Zambia, and Zimbabwe. It is found in grassy areas dominated by grasses, sedges or shrubs near water (streams, rivers or lakes), from 350–2,150 m (1,150–7,050 ft).

== Gallery ==
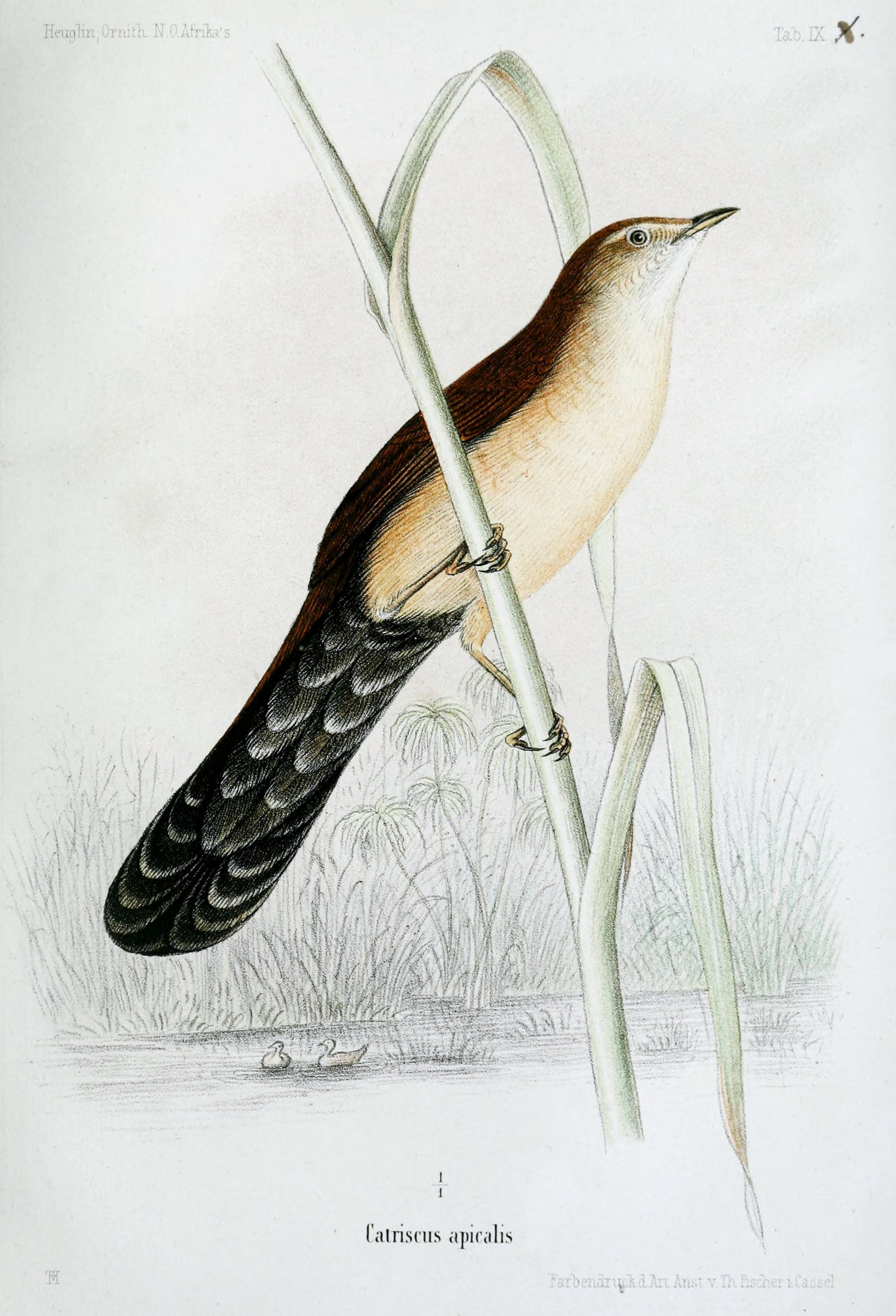

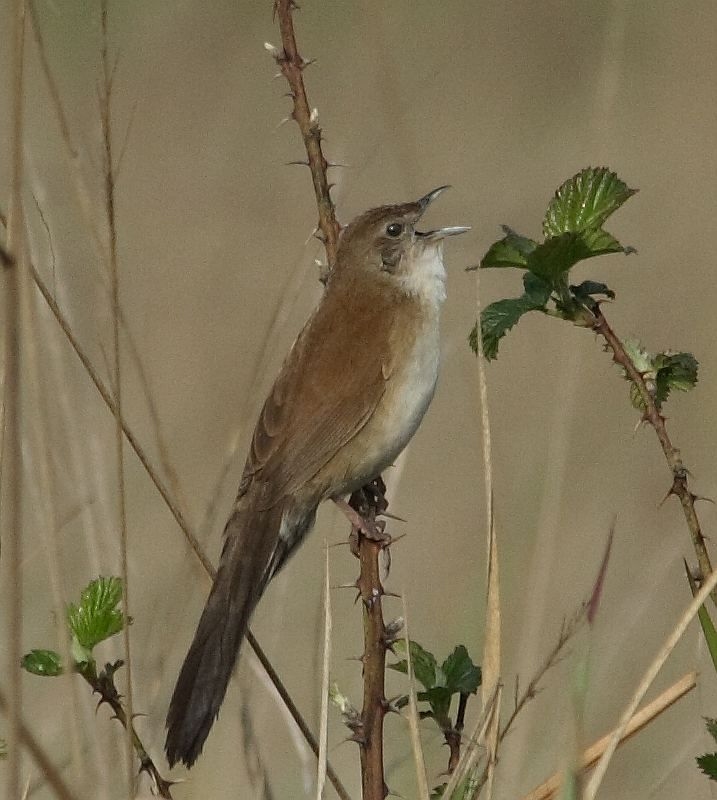

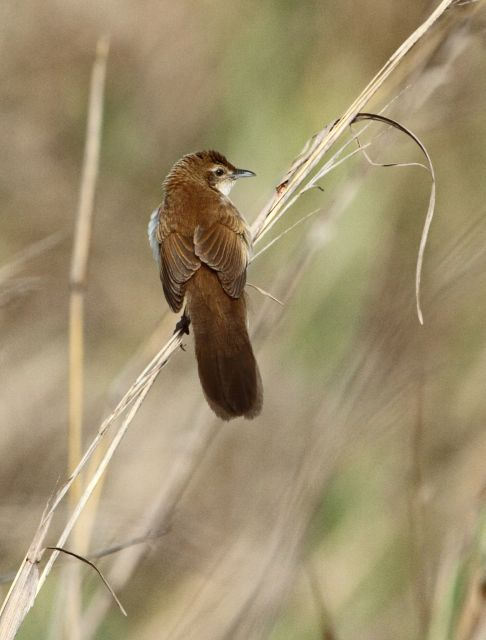
