= Valapattanam River =

Coordinates: 11°56′N 75°18′E

Valapattanam
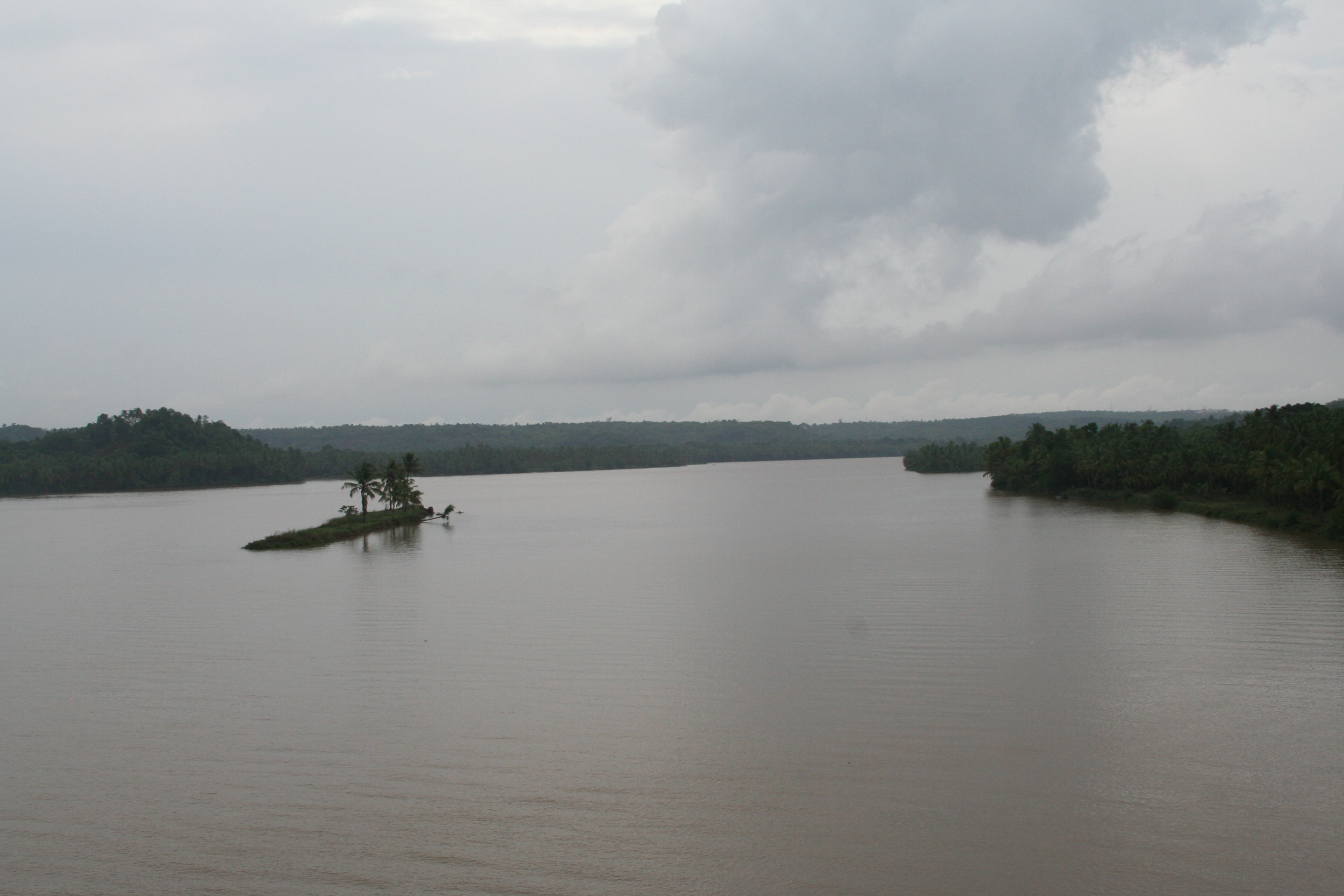
- A view of Valapattanam river from Parassinikkadavu Bridge.

Location
- Country: India
- State: Kerala
- District: Kannur
- Towns: Sreekandapuram, Parassinikadavu, Valapattanam, Pappinisseri, Azhikode

Physical characteristics
- Mouth
  - location: Arabian Sea (Azhikkal Port)
  - elevation: 0 m (0 ft)
- Length: 110 km (68 mi)

Basin features
- Progression: West flowing river
- Landmarks: Muthappan temple

The Valapattanam River is a 110 km long river which flows through the Kannur district in North Kerala. It is the longest river in the Kannur district.

It has an ancient name "Khritha Thadini" in Sanskrit texts, which means Milk Rilver (Khritha - Milk and Thadini - River)

== Course ==
The Valapattanam River originates from the Brahmagiri hills of Western Ghats in Karnataka. Initially the river flows towards the eastern direction through some villages in the hilly Malenadu region of Karnataka, like Matyani, Birunani, Poradu, Badagarakeri and Kikkod. Later it takes a sharp bend toward the west and flows through a narrow deep valley descending towards the hilly regions of Kannur district. It then flows through the hilly region of Kannur, passing through Manikkadavu, Vattiyamthode, Vayathur, Nuchiyad, Chamathachal, Uchatthu kayam (where the Payyavoor river joins), Madambam The river then enters the Malabar plains where it flows through the towns of Sreekandapuram, Chengalayi, Mungam, Koyyam (where the Bavali river joins), Kandakkai, Mullakkodi Nanichery, Parassinikadavu, Kolachery, Kambil, Narath, Velapuram, Pappinissery, Azhikode and empties into the Arabian Sea at Azhikkal where the Kuppam River joins the Valapattanam.

== Tributaries ==
=== Major Tributaries ===
- Bavali River - An 84 km long river originating in Wayanad district. It flows through the towns such as Iritty and Irikkur where it is locally known as Iritty river or Irikkur River (Ayippuzha), and passes through the eastern hilly regions of Kannur district and joins the Valapattanam River at Munambu Kadavu near Koyyam.
- Sreekandapuram River - A major tributary that drains portions of the midland plains before its confluence.
- Aralam River - Originating from the Brahmagiri Wildlife Sanctuary, it passes through the Aralam Wildlife Sanctuary before joining the main river channel.
- Veni River (Venippuzha) - A smaller connecting tributary that merges into the Bavali River channel shortly before the combined waters enter the Valapattanam.
- Barapole River (Valiyapuzha) - Originates in the Brahmagiri Wildlife Sanctuary in Kodagu district, Karnataka, and forms a major tributary of the Valapattanam River. It flows westward into the Malabar plains near Iritty.

=== Minor Tributaries ===
- Payyavoor River
- Pulloopi River
- Mundayapuzha River
- Thayikkundam River
