= Bavali River =

River in Kerala, India

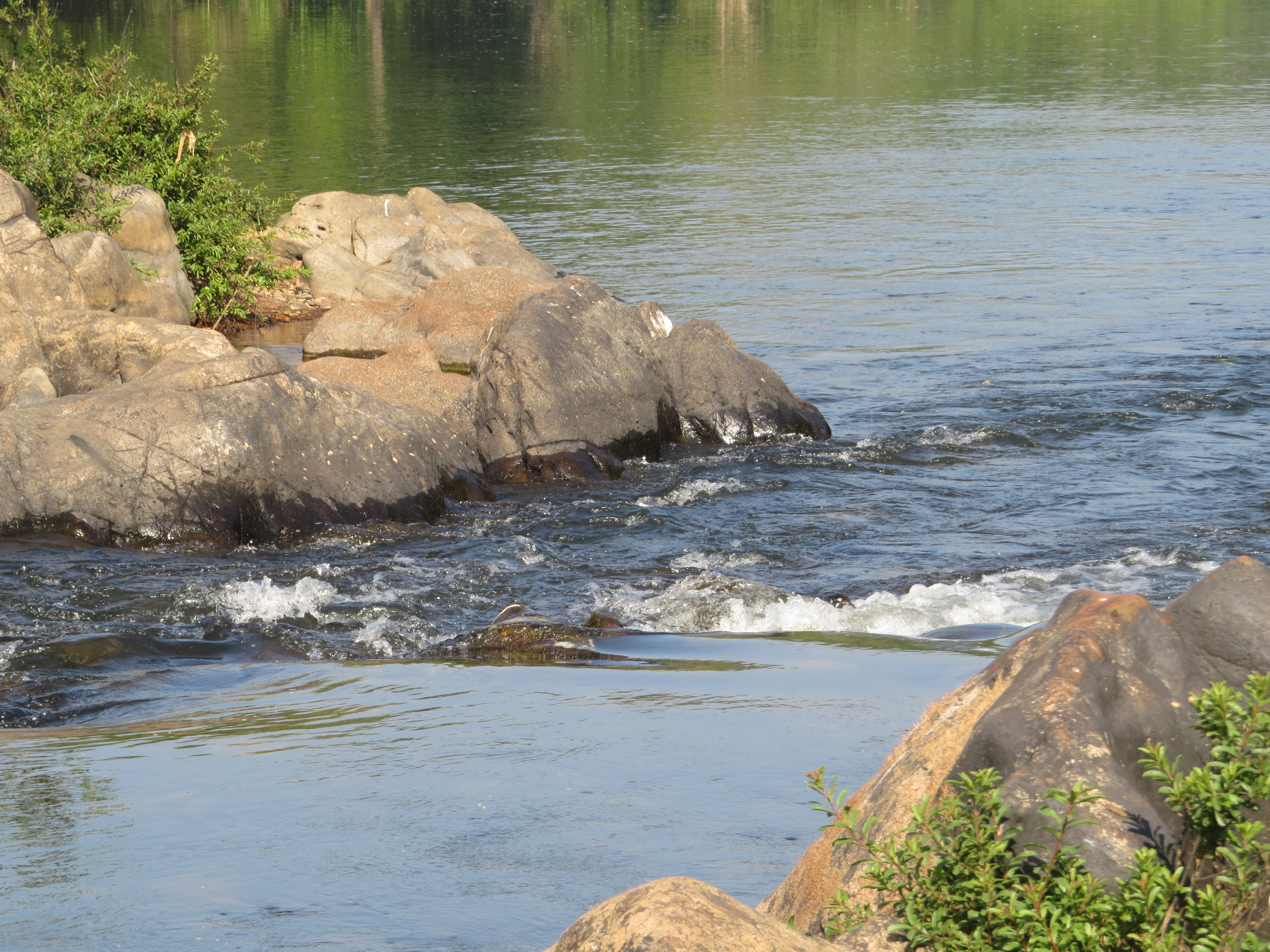

Location
- Country: India
- State: Kerala
- District: Kannur
- Towns: Kottiyoor, Kelakam, Peravoor, Iritty, Irikkur

Physical characteristics
- Source: Chekuthanthode, Brahmagiri Range
  - location: Wayanad district, Kerala, India
  - coordinates: 11°53′10″N 75°51′20″E
  - elevation: 1,500 m (4,900 ft)
- Mouth: Valapattanam River
  - location: Munambu Kadavu, Kannur district, Kerala
  - coordinates: 11°58′05″N 75°31′20″E
- Length: 84 km

Basin features
- Progression: West flowing river
- Landmarks: Kottiyoor Temple, Pazhassi Dam

The Bavali River is an 84 km long river that flows from the Chekuthan thodu, in Wayanad in the South Indian state of Kerala which goes to Valapattanam River at Munambu Kadavu, Kannur. The famous Shiva temple Kottiyoor Temple is located in the middle of a small river known as Thiruvanchira on the north bank of the Bavali River. Kottiyoor Vaisakha Festival is held on the banks of Bavalipuzha. It is also known as Vavu Balippuzha (Vavali river).

== Course ==
The Bavali River starts from Chekuthan thode in Wayanad District in Kerala. Initially the river flows over 20 km in the Western Ghats region to reach Ambayathode. Then the river enters the eastern hilly regions of Kannur district at Kottiyoor village. Then the river passes through small towns- Chungakkunnu, Kelakam, Kanichar and Pala(Kannur)(where the Kanjirapuzha river joins). Then the river reaches at Ayyapankavu, where the Aralam river joins the Bavali river. Then it flows towards Iritty town where the Veni river joins the Bavali river. Then the Bavali river passes through Padiyoor, Perumannu, Irikkur, Pavannur and finally joins with the Valapattanam River at Munambu Kadavu, Koyyam.

== Tributaries ==
- Kanjirapuzha river
- Aralam river
- Veni river

== Gallery ==
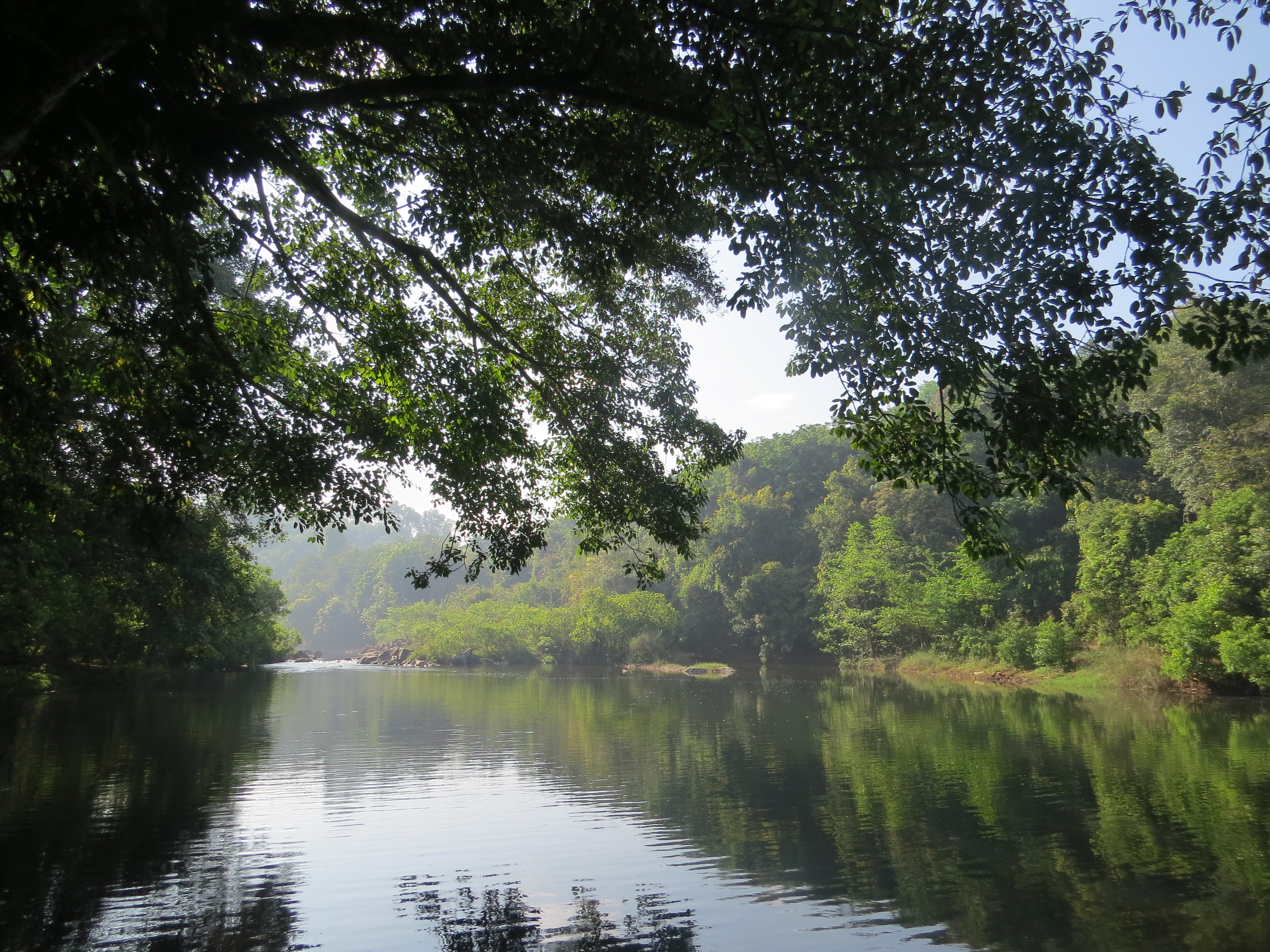
Bavali river at Palappuzha

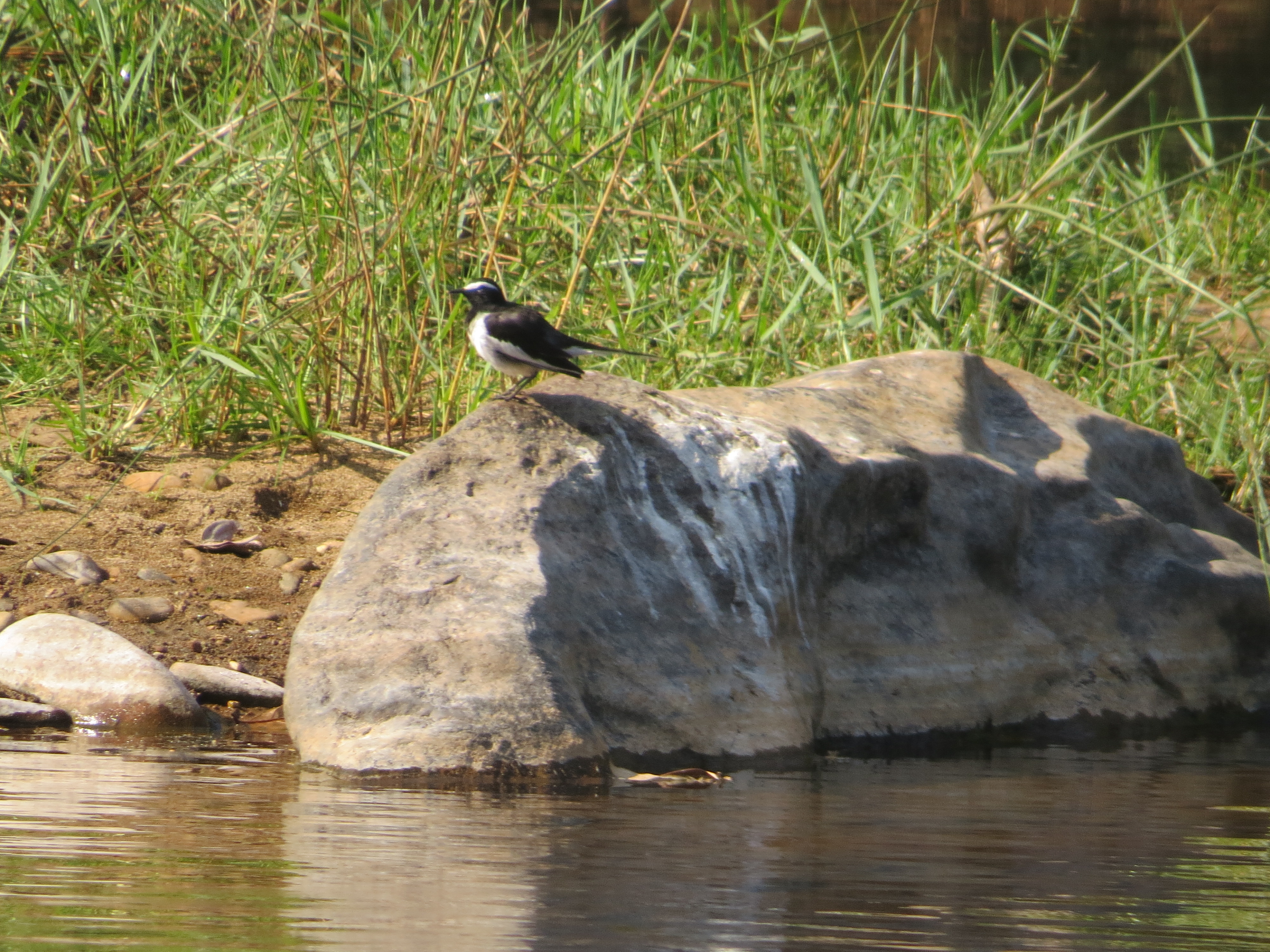
Bavali river at Palappuzha

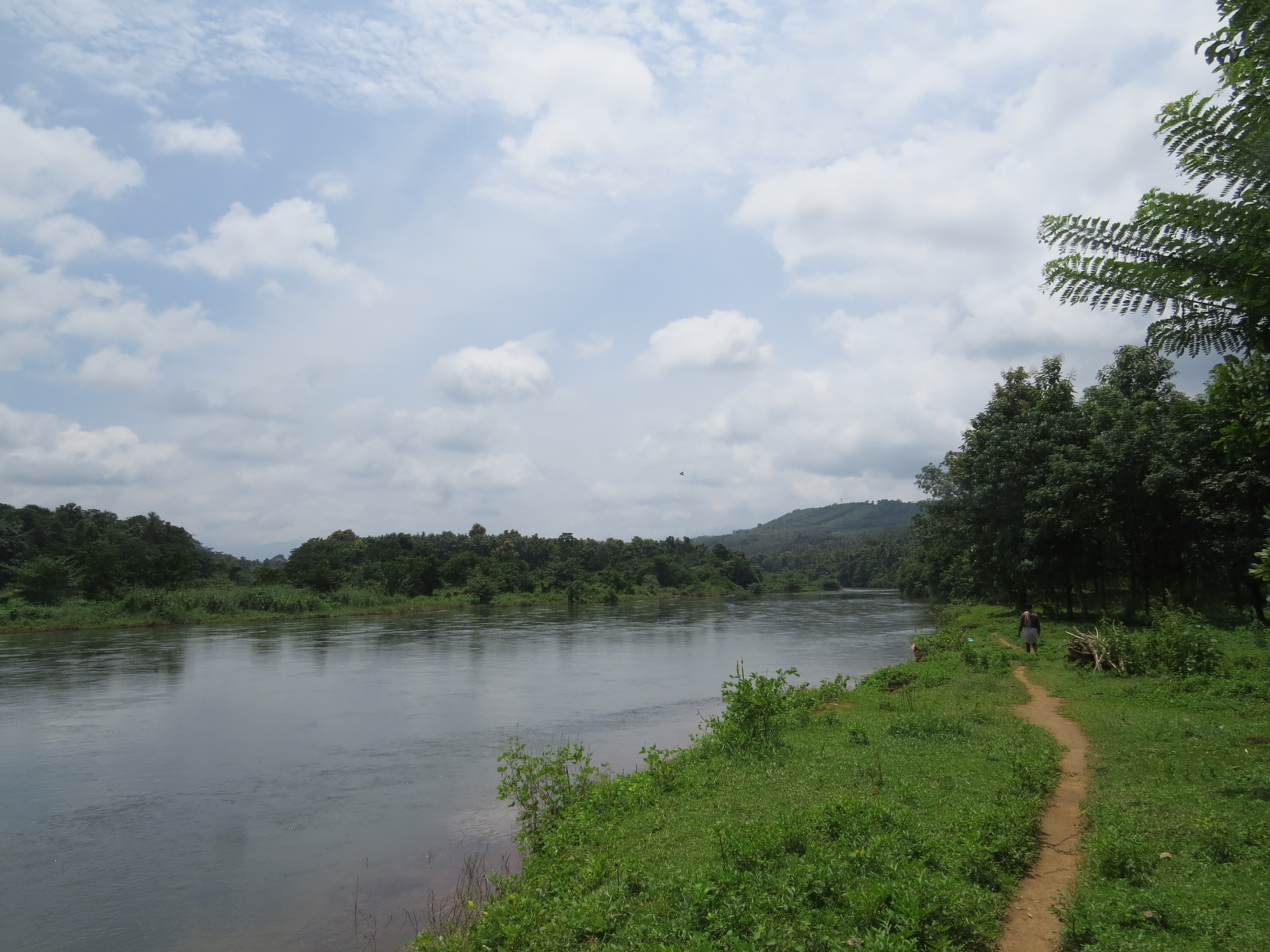
Bavali river at Palappuzha

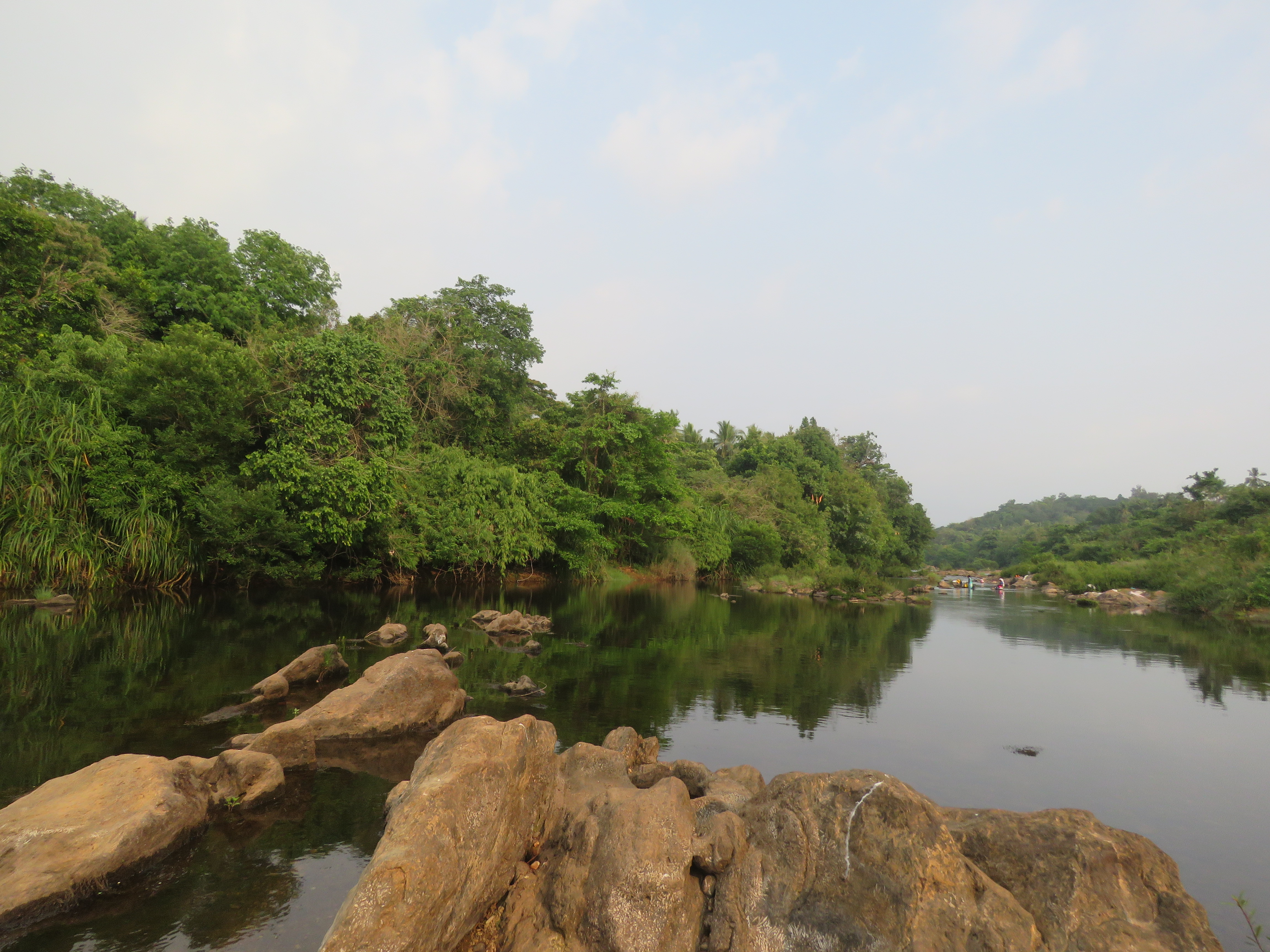
Bavali river at Palappuzha
