= Thayikkundam River =

River in Kerala, India

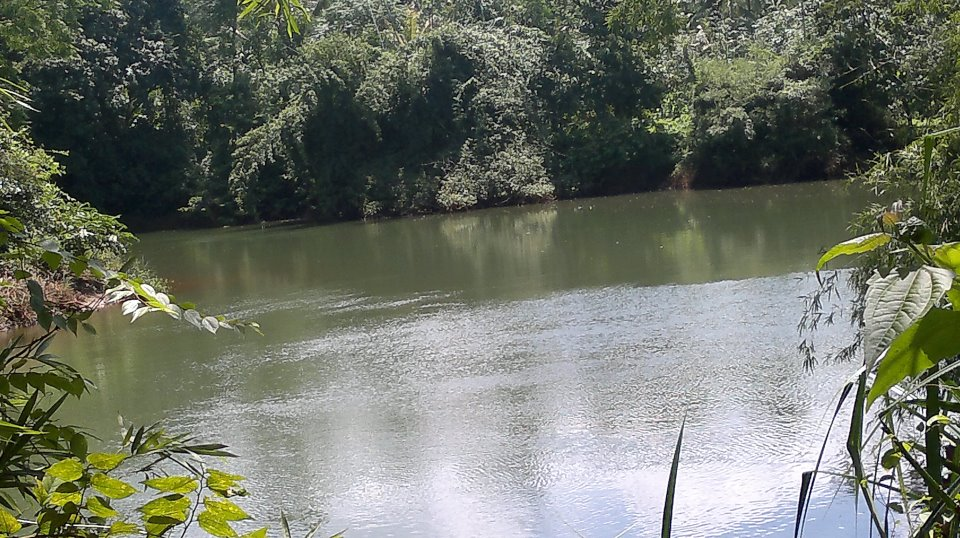
Thayikkundam river

Thayikkundam River also known as Thayikkundam Puzha (Malayalam: തായിക്കുണ്ടം പുഴ) is a part of Valapattanam River, the largest river in the Kannur district, located in the South Indian state of Kerala. This river starts from the Western Ghats and joins the Arabian Sea. The river enters Kerala near Nuchiyadu and flows through Thayikkundam. Thayikkundam river is the major source of irrigation water for Ulikkal, Padiyoor-Kalliad and Payyavoor Panchayaths. Thayikkundam river is the waterway very commonly used to transport woods to Valapattanam from different parts near this river. The greenery in both sides of this river is the specialty of this river.
