= Mullakkodi =

Village in Kerala, India

- Village
- Interactive map of Mullakkodi
- Coordinates: 12°0′30″N 75°24′40″E
- Country: India
- State: Kerala
- District: Kannur

Languages
  - Official: Malayalam, English
- Time zone: UTC+5:30 (IST)
- PIN: 670602
- Telephone code: 04602
- ISO 3166 code: IN-KL
- Lok Sabha constituency: Kannur
- Climate: Tropical monsoon (Köppen)
- Avg. summer temperature: 35 °C (95 °F)
- Avg. winter temperature: 20 °C (68 °F)

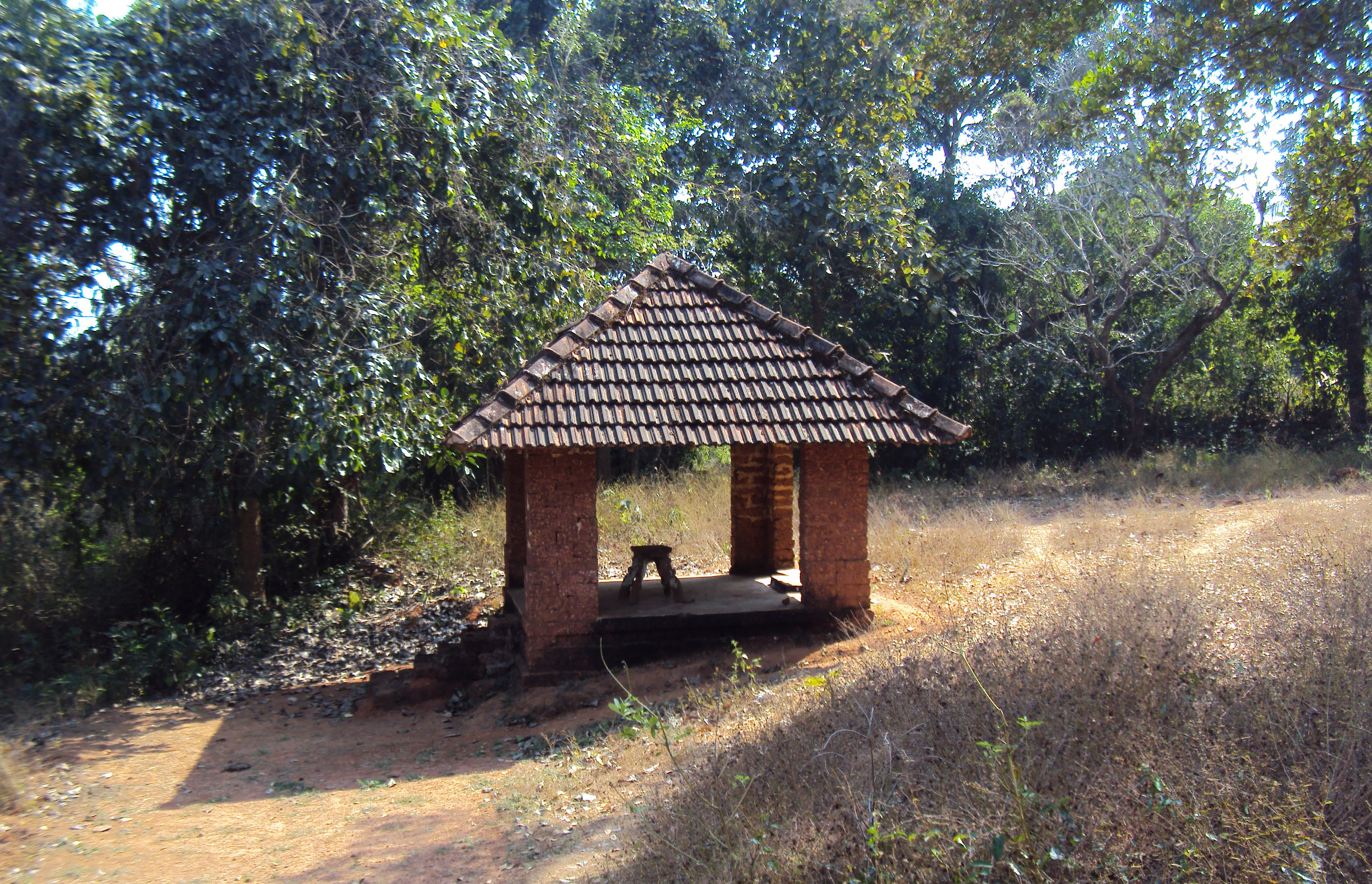
Vettakkarumakan temple

Mullakkodi is a village in Mayyil Gram Panchayat of Kannur District situated on the East Bank of Valapattanam river. Mullakkodi is known for its backwaters, paddy fields and for its community festival called the Ayar Munamba Manna Maqam Urooz.

== Educational institutions ==
- Mullakkodi AUP School
- Mullakkodi Mappila ALP School
- Arimbra English Medium School
- Izzathul Islam Madrasa

== Cultural organisations ==
- Mullakkodi C R C Vayanashala & Grandalayam
- Navodaya Kalasamithi
- Islamic Cultural Society
- CRC Sports Club and Nehru Yuva Kendra
- Love Star Sports club, Mullakkodi
- Balasangham, Kudumba Sree Mullakkodi Unit

== Festivals ==
- Festival at Arimbra Subramanya Swamy Temple in the month of March (22 March)
- Chonnamma Kaavu Festival in the month of Feb (First week of Feb)
- Aayar Munamba Manna Maqam Urooz
- Vettakkarumakan temple Festival in the month of April (last week of April)
- Vayanattu kulavan temple festival in month of March (first week of March)

== Transportation ==
The national highway passes through Valapattanam. Goa and Mumbai can be accessed on the northern side and Cochin and Thiruvananthapuram can be accessed on the southern side. The road to the east of Iritty connects to Mysore and Bangalore. The nearest railway station is Kannur on the Mangalore-Palakkad line. Trains are available to almost all parts of India subject to advance booking over the internet. There are airports at Mattanur, Mangalore and Calicut. All of them are international airports but direct flights are available only to Middle Eastern countries. Since the inauguration of Nanicheri Kadavu Bridge by Kerala CM Pinarayi Vijayan, the time taken to reach Taliparamba hence Payyannur, Kasaragod reduced drastically for those who are coming from Mattannur, Iritty etc. James Mathew MLA has spearheaded the speedy construction of the bridge.
