= Perumbarakkadavu =

- Country: India
- State: Kerala
- District: Kannur
- Time zone: UTC+5:30 (IST)
- PIN: 670142
- ISO 3166 code: IN-KL
- Vehicle registration: KL-59
- Nearest city: Taliparamba
- Lok Sabha constituency: Kannur
- Climate: cool (Köppen)

Perumbarakkadavu is a tiny village in Chengalai Panchayat, Kannur district.

== Geography ==
There is a river in this village, which is natively called here as "Kandakkai River".

== Landmarks ==
Here is an arts and sports club cum library in this village named "Yuvachetana".

== Transportation ==
The national highway passes through Taliparamba town. Goa and Mumbai can be accessed on the northern side and Cochin and Thiruvananthapuram can be accessed on the southern side. Taliparamba has a good bus station and buses are easily available to all parts of Kannur district. The road to the east of Iritty connects to Mysore and Bangalore. But buses to these cities are available only from Kannur, 22 km to the south. The nearest railway stations are Kannapuram and Kannur on Mangalore-Palakkad line. Trains are available to almost all parts of India subject to advance booking over the internet. There are airports at Kannur, Mangalore and Calicut. All of them are small international airports with direct flights available only to Middle Eastern countries.
