= Kottiyoor Vysakha Mahotsavam =

27-day annual pilgrimage by Hindus

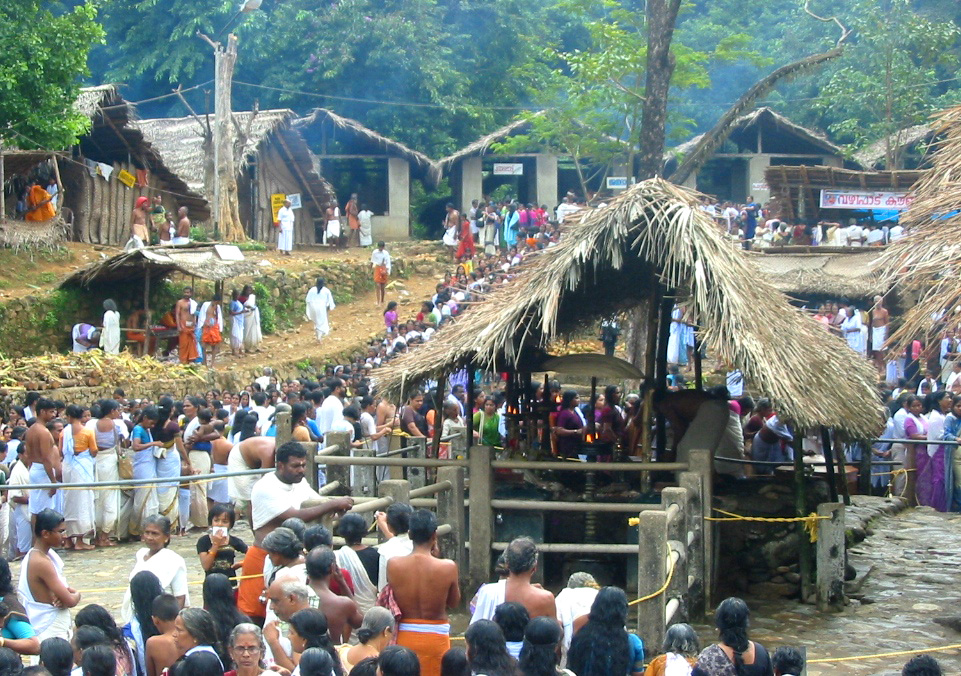
- Kottiyoor Yajna Bhoomi
- Official name: Vysakha Mahotsavam
- Also called: Kottiyoor Utsavam
- Observed by: Hindu
- Type: Religious
- Observances: Circumambulation of the Swayambhu linga through the sacred pond (Thiruvanchira)
- Begins: Swati in Saka Calendar:Vaisakha; (Gregorian Calendar: May–June)
- Ends: Chitra in Saka Calendar:Jyaistha; (Gregorian Calendar:June–July)
- Duration: 27 days
- Related to: Daksha Yaga

Kottiyoor Vysakha Mahotsavam (Sanskrit: वैशाख महोत्सव) is an annual 27-day Hindu pilgrimage held in Kottiyoor, Kerala. The festival commemorates the Daksha Yaga, a significant event in Hindu mythology. Similar to the Kumbh Mela at Prayag, the pilgrimage features ritual ablutions. The site is not classified as a conventional temple due to the absence of permanent structures. Instead, a temporary hermitage constructed with Palmyra leaves, known as Yajna Bhoomi, serves as the focal point of the rituals. Kottiyoor is also referred to as Dakshina Kasi (the Varanasi of the South) for its religious significance.

== Shrines ==
Located in Kannur, Kerala, Kottiyoor features two shrines situated on the banks of the Vavali. On the west bank stands the permanent Thruchherumana Vadakkeshwaram Temple (also known as Ikkare Kottiyoor), which follows a traditional Nalukettu architectural style. On the east bank, there is a temporary shrine called Akkare Kottiyoor, exclusively used during the Vysakha Mahotsavam.

During the festival, tens of thousands of pilgrims gather at the Yajna Bhoomi, where pujas are conducted in a temporary temple built at the prehistoric Vedic site of Akkare Kottiyoor. This structure is dismantled after the event. The focal point of the temple is a Swayambhu Shivalinga, where devotees perform ablutions. Unlike traditional temples, Akkare Kottiyoor lacks a Sreekovil(Garbhagriha); instead, it stands on a raised platform made of river stones, surrounded by a pond. Water from the pond flows into the Vavali River. When viewed from above, the entire shrine resembles a Shivalinga. Devotees circumambulate the shrine within the pond, usually in the rain. Adjacent to the main shrine is a raised circular platform named Ammarakal Thara(Manithara), where tradition holds that Sati immolated herself. Additionally, a giant Jayanti vilakku (a variant of Lakshmi lamp) and a Bhagavathi mirror idol under a palmyra leaf umbrella are present.

The Ikkare Kottiyoor and Akkare Kottiyoor temples are dedicated to Shiva. The Vavali River flows between the shrines. While the former is attributed to Parashurama, the latter is considered Swayambhu (naturally formed).

The Prathishta (installation) of the Thruchherumanna Temple is believed to have been performed by Parashurama on the western bank of the river. The Thruchherumanna Temple is dedicated to the year-round worship of Shiva, in contrast to the Swayambhuu linga, which can only be venerated for 27 days annually. Sankaracharya is credited with codifying the temple's rites and rituals. He visited the Thruchherumana temple and offered worship, but refrained from crossing the river to the Swayambhuu linga as it was not the Vysakha pilgrimage period. It is believed that during this visit, Sankaracharya discerned the Swayambhuu linga as a universal representation of Shiva, eternally united with Nature (Prakruti or Devi). Shiva and Shakti, in this merged state, are believed to prefer undisturbed solitude, granting blessings solely during the Vysakha Mahotsavam. This belief persists, prohibiting visits to the Swayambhuu linga or Akkare kottiyoor outside the Vysakha pilgrimage. Sankaracharya performed ablutions in the Vavali river, prayed from the western bank, and then continued his journey.

The deity at Kottiyoor is worshipped as the universal form of Shiva, symbolizing pure consciousness, in conjunction with Prakṛti (Devi). This form is described in the Śrī Rudram, a hymn from the Taittirīya Saṃhitā of the Krishna Yajurveda (TS 4.5, 4.7), and is meditated upon during the chanting of the Śhrī Rudram hymns. Unlike many other Shiva shrines, the deity here is situated in an open space, exposed to the elements, symbolizing the unrestricted and boundless nature of the divine. This form also represents the union of Shiva and Shakti, interpreted as a cosmic synergy of consciousness and nature. The following Vedic hymn illustrates the universal form of Shiva revered at Kottiyoor Yajña Bhūmi:
पीठं यस्य धरित्री जलधरकलशं लिङ्गमाकाशमूर्तिम्
नक्षत्रं पुष्पमाल्यं ग्रहगणकुसुमं चन्द्रवह्न्यर्कनेत्रम्।
कुक्षिः सप्तसमुद्रं भुजगिरिशिखरं सप्तपाताळपादम्
वेदं वक्त्रं षडङ्गं दशदिश वसनं दिव्यलिङ्गं नमामि॥
pīṭhaṁ yasya dharitrī jaladharakalaśaṁ liṅgamākāśamūrtim
nakṣatraṁ puṣpamālyaṁ grahagaṇakusumaṁ chandravahnyarkanetram|
kukṣiḥ saptasamudraṁ bhujagiriśikharaṁ saptapātāḻapādam
vedaṁ vaktraṁ ṣaḍaṅgaṁ daśadiśa vasanaṁ divyaliṅgaṁ namāmi||
Meaning: "I offer salutations to the divine linga, whose expanse is spread across the sky, whose base is the earth, and whose water pot comprises rain-filled clouds. The stars form the flower garland, the planets serve as blossoms, and the Moon, the Sun, and Fire are the three eyes. The seven seas constitute the belly, while the mountain peaks are the deity's arms, and the seven Pātālas form the legs. The mouth represents the Vedas (Ṛig, Yajur, Sāma, Atharva) and their six limbs (Chandas, Vyākaraṇa, Kalpa, Jyotiṣa, Nirukta, Śīkṣā), while the ten directions serve as the divine garment."

According to the Viṣhṇupurāṇa and Devībhāgavatam, the earth is described as consisting of seven islands surrounded by seven oceans: Jambudvīpa (the terrestrial realm) encircled by a saltwater ocean (Lavana); Plakṣadvīpa, surrounded by an ocean of sugarcane juice (Ikshu); Kuśadvīpa, surrounded by an ocean of ghee (Sarpi); Krauñchadvīpa, surrounded by an ocean of curd (Dadhi); Śākadvīpa, surrounded by an ocean of milk (Kṣīra); Śālmalīdvīpa, surrounded by an ocean of liquor (Surā); and Puṣkaradvīpa, surrounded by an ocean of pure water (Suddhodaka).

== Period of pilgrimage ==
The festival occurs from the Swati Nakshatra of the Saka calendar month of Vaisakha to the Chitra Nakshatra of Jyaistha month. This is equivalent to the Malayalam calendar months of Medam-Edavam to Edavam-Mithunam or the Gregorian months of May–June to June–July. The pilgrimage occurs during the monsoon season when there is abundant rainfall in the region. The flow of the Vavali river water is suitable for ablutions and the sacred pond Tiruvanchira is filled with water. The climate during the pilgrimage is moderate to slightly cold.

Even though the pilgrimage is called Kottiyoor Ulsavam or Kottiyoor Festival, the programs related to the pilgrimage are only religious rituals there are no entertainment programs like festivals in other temples. Only Vedic hymns are recited, and priestly rites and rituals are performed.

== Legend ==
Daksha Yagna was an important turning point in the creation and development of sects in Hinduism like Shaktism and Shaivism. It is the story behind the 'Stala Purana' (Origin story of Temples) of Shakta pithas.

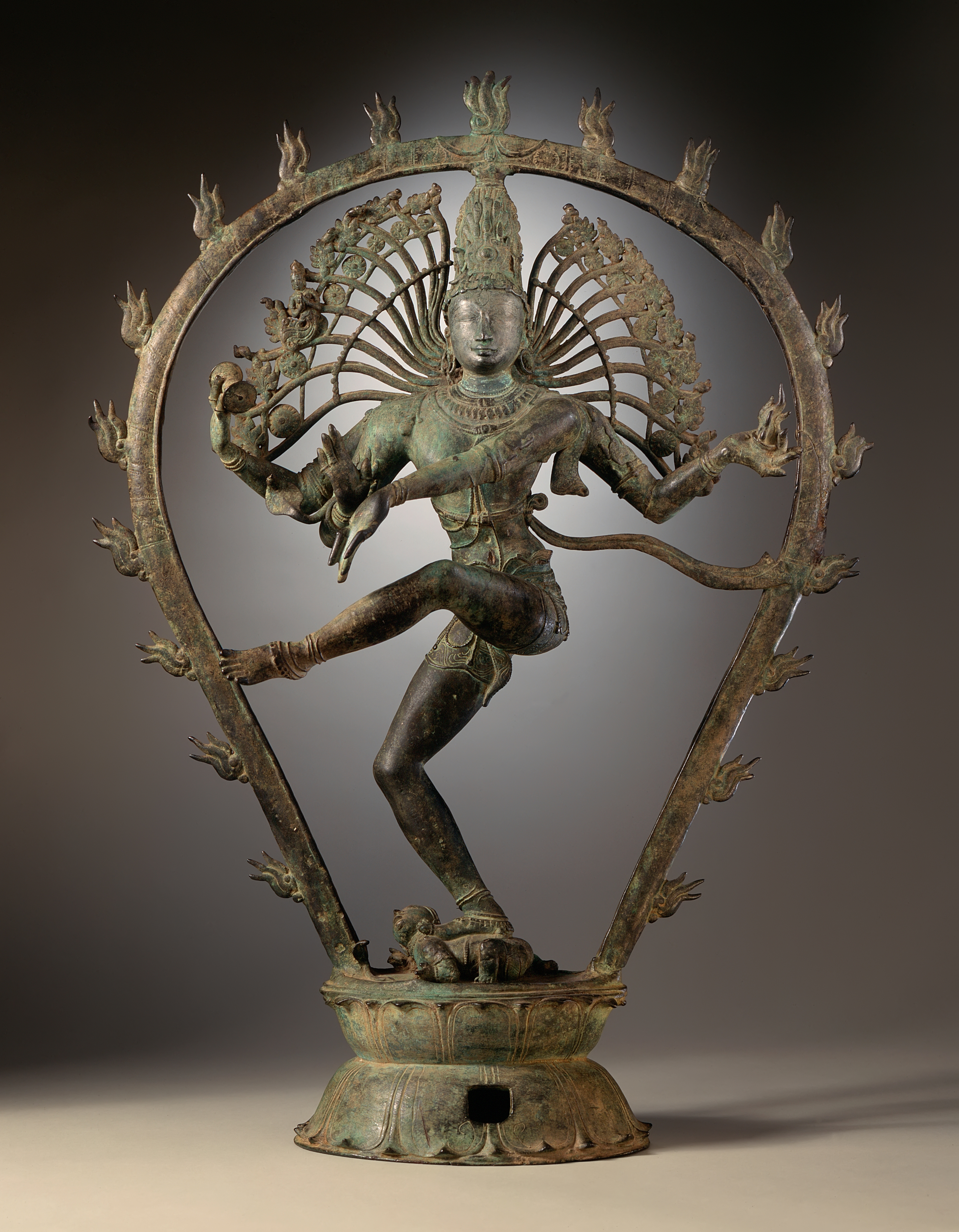
Shiva as Nataraja- A Chola Age Statue-(Los Angeles County Museum of Art)

Daksha organised a huge Yaga and intentionally avoided Shiva and Sati. Even though discouraged by Shiva, who told her not to go to a function where she and her husband were uninvited, the personal bondage with her parents made Sati ignore social etiquette and her husband's wishes. Sati, without Shiva, went to the ceremony. She was snubbed by Daksha and insulted by him in front of the guests. Sati, unable to bear further insult, ran into the Sacrificial fire and immolated herself. Shiva, upon knowing the terrible incident in his wrath, invoked Virabhadra and Bhadrakali by plucking a lock of hair and thrashing it on the ground. Virabhadra and Bhoota ganas marched south and destroyed all the premises. Daksha was decapitated and the yagnja shaala was devastated in the rampage. The Bhutaganas celebrated the victory by plucking the beard of the 'Presiding Master' of the yagna, Sage Bhrigu, as a war souvenir. Daksha was later forgiven and given life by fixing a ram (Male Goat)'s head and the yagna was allowed to complete, with the presence of all the divinity.

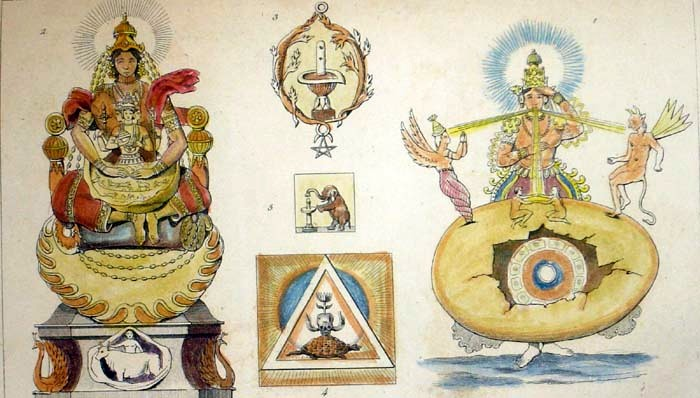
Prajapati and his activities-Illustration

The story continues with the act of Vishnu pacifying Shiva, who was in deep grief at seeing the half-burned corpse of his beloved wife. Vishnu embraced Shiva to pacify him. Shiva, unable to part with Sati, took her corpse and wandered. The body parts of the corpse of Sati Devi fell in the places Shiva travelled. The places where the body parts Sati Devi's corpse fell came to be known as Shakta pithas.

== Mythology ==
The mythological story of Daksha Yaga has immense influence in Shaivism and Shaktism literal Vaishnava philoPrajapathis derived from or resulted in an epilogue of this tale. These include the origin of Shakta pithas, the marriage of Shiva and Shree Parvathi, resulting in the birth of Ganesh and Subrahmanya, and the story about the death of Kamadeva.

Daksha, one of the Prajapatis, was a son of Brahma and among his foremost creations. The name Daksha means “Skilled One.” He had two wives: Prasoothi and Panchajani (Virini). His youngest daughter, Sati (also known as Uma due to her generous austerity), was born from Prasoothi, the daughter of the Prajapati Manu. Sati was Daksha's beloved child, and he always carried her with him. The name Sati signifies the feminine aspect of Sat (meaning “The Truth”). She is also called Dakshayani, as she follows Daksha's path. This name is derived from the Sanskrit words Daksha (referring to Daksha himself) and Ayana(meaning “Walk” or “Path”).

The mythology of Daksha Yaga is primarily recounted in the Vayu Purana. It also appears in the Kasi Kanda of the Skanda Purana, the Kurma Purana, the Harivamsa Purana, and the Padma Purana. Additionally, the Linga Purana, Shiva Purana, and Matsya Purana provide details of this incident.

The mythology is derived from the ancient Sanskrit texts called Puranas.

- The mythology of Daksha Yaga is mainly from the Vaayu Purana. There is also a description of the mythology in Padma Purana, Skanda Purana, Kurma Purana, Harivamsa Purana, Matsya Purana, Linga Purana, Shiva Purana from the perspective of Shaiva Vaishnava philosophies. Puranas which are more inclined to Vaishnavism are Vaishnava Puranas; similarly, there are Shaiva and Shakta Puranas.
- The Vaayu Purana mentions the invoking of Bhadrakali and addresses her also as Rudrakali.
- The Vaayu Purana does not mention the decapitation of Daksha; instead, it says Yagnja the personification of Yaga, took the form of an antelope and jumped towards the sky; Veerabhadra captured it and decapitated Yagnja. But Linga Purana and Bhagavatha Purana mention about the decapitation of Daksha
- Vaayu Purana mentions the attack of Bhutaganas, the nose of some goddesses being cut, breaking Yama Deva's staff bone, Mitra's eyes, Indra trampled by Veerabhadra and Bhutaganas, Pusha's teeth knocked down, Chandra Deva was beaten heavily, all of the Prajapathis' were beaten, the hands of Vahini were cut off, Bhrigu's beard been cut off.
- Certain other Puranas like Harivamsa, Kurma, and Skanda narrate the story from the perspective of the Vishnava-Shaiva community enmity prevalent in olden times. Here there are combats between Vishnu and Shiva or Veerabhadra and in these Puranas time the former or the latter wins
- In Vaayu Purana, Daksha is not decapitated as said before; instead, he begs mercy from the Parabrahma (The Supreme Almighty who is formless), who rose from the Yagna fire and forgives Daksha. The Parabharma informs Daksha that Shiva is, in fact, a manifestation of Parabrahma. Daksha then becomes a great devotee of Shiva.
- The story of Daksha Yaga in Vaishnava and Shaiva Puranas ends with the surrender of Daksha to the Parabrahma or until the destruction of Yaga and decapitation of Daksha in various Puranas.
- The Epilogue of the mythology is the creation of Shakta pithas. This epilogue is usually told along with the story of Daksha Yaga by the Shakta sect of Hinduism. There are two different versions of the formation of Shakta pithas in post-puranic texts or regional stories. The Vaishnava version says Vishnu cut the corpse of Sati Devi using Sudarshana chakra to pacify Shiva the Shaiva version says the parts were fallen while Shiva was carrying the corpse of Sati in various places. Both versions have a common end, which says the places where these body parts fell came to be known as Shakta pithas. The Shakta pithas are mentioned in Shakta(Shaktism) Puranas like Devi Bhagavatha Purana and Kalika Purana. Some of the Puranas, which came in later ages, gave more importance to their supreme deity (depending on Vaishnava, Shaiva and Shakta sects) in their literature.
- Various locations: In addition to Kottiyoor, two other shrines believe their respective place as a location as the site of Daksha Yaga they are Kanakhala near Haridwar in Himachal Pradesh and Draksharamam in Andhra Pradesh. Kanakhala and Draksharamam are temples, and Kottiyoor Vysakha Mohotsavam is a 27-day, yearly pilgrimage(entry is prohibited for the rest of the year).

=== The Sati-Shiva Marriage ===
Sati, the youngest daughter of Daksha, deeply loved Shiva and aspired to become his wife. Her worship and devotion towards Shiva intensified her desire to be his better half. However, Daksha disapproved of his daughter's contemplation of Shiva. This disapproval stemmed from Daksha's position as a Prajapati, the Emperor of Dakshina Desa in Aryavarta (an ancient Indian region comprising Afghanistan, Pakistan, India, Nepal, and Bangladesh), and his status as the son of Brahma. Sati, on the other hand, was the Emperor’s daughter—a royal princess. Their opulent lifestyle sharply contrasted with Shiva's humble existence. As an Emperor, Daksha sought to enhance his influence and power through marriage alliances with powerful empires and influential sages and Devas (Adityas).

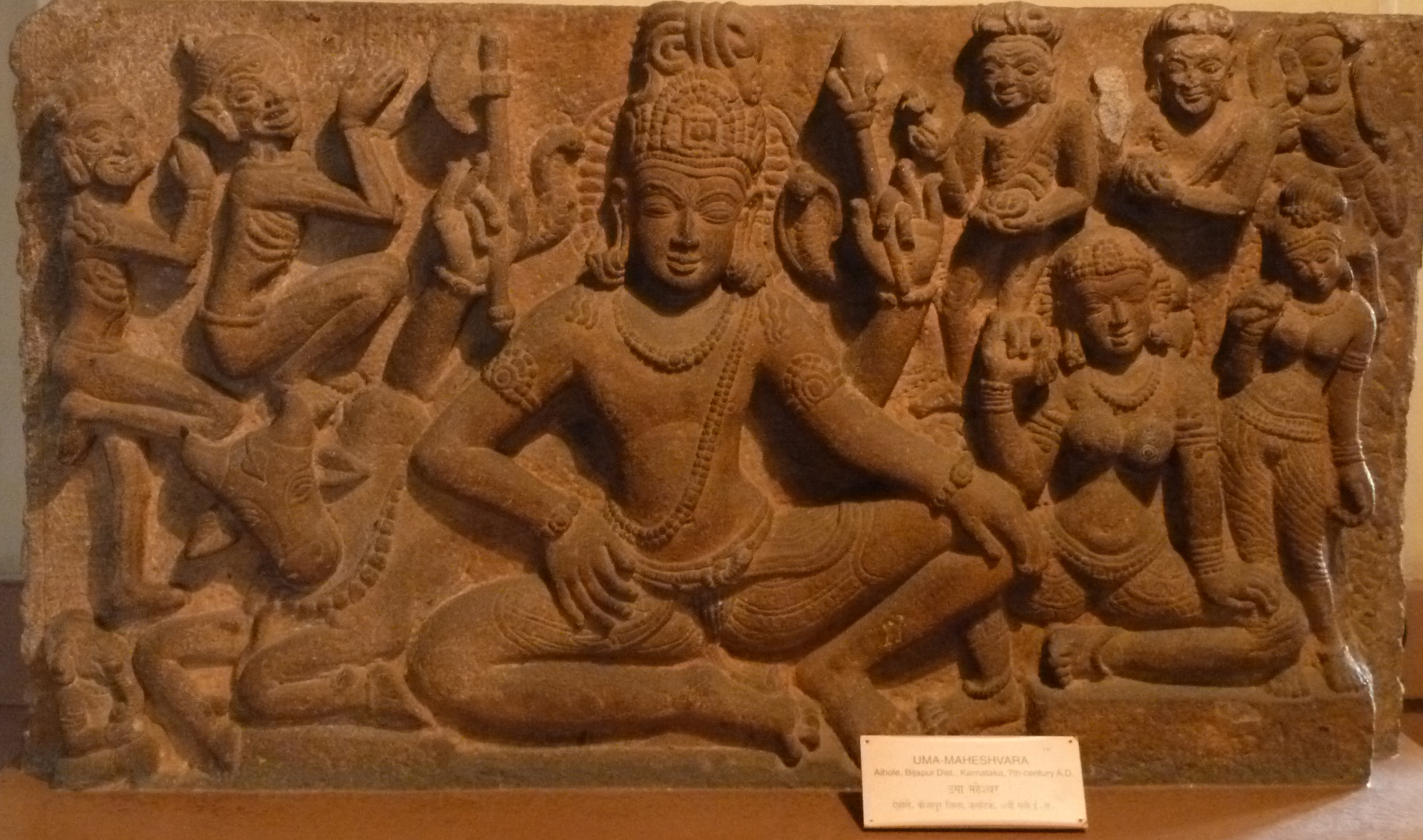
Uma Maheshwara(Sati and Shiva with Bhutaganas); 7th CE wall engravings; Prince of Wales Museum, Mumbai

In stark contrast, Shiva led a modest life. He dwelled among the downtrodden, clad in a tiger skin, his body smeared with ashes. His thick, matted hair framed his face, and he begged with a skull as his bowl. His abode was Mount Kailasa in the freezing Himalayas, where only mountains, rocks, and snow prevailed. Shiva embraced all living beings without distinction—good souls and bad souls alike. His followers, the Bhutaganas (assembly of clan heads), included ghosts, demons, ghouls, and goblins. He wandered through gardens and graveyards alike.

Daksha harboured aversion toward Shiva as a potential companion for his daughter. However, unlike Daksha, Sati Devi loved Shiva profoundly. She had the revelation that Shiva, the Supreme Rudra, was, in fact, The Mahadev or The Paramashwara (The Supreme Almighty-Parabrahmam)

As his daughters grew up, Daksha conducted a Swayamvara yagam. Swayamvara was an ancient form of marriage where the woman had the authority to choose her husband from prospective suitors. Sati undoubtedly chose Shiva. The marriage ceremony between Sati and Shiva took place. Daksha was compelled to accept Shiva as his son-in-law since he did not influence the groom selection process.

=== Brahma's Yaga ===
Once, Brahma Deva Daksha's father conducted a grand yajna. All the Prajapatis from around the world, along with the Adityas and kings, were invited by Brahma to participate in the yajna. Shiva and Sati were also among the invitees. Everyone gathered at the ceremonial place for the yajna, and Daksha arrived last. As he entered, all the attendees stood up in reverence, recognizing him as one of the Prajapatis. However, Brahma, Shiva, and Sati Devi remained seated, not rising to greet Daksha. This was a global event, attended by emperors, kings, and esteemed individuals from various regions. Strict adherence to etiquette was expected. Brahma refrained from standing, being Daksha's father. Sati, too, followed her husband's lead and did not rise.

Shiva's position as Daksha's son-in-law created a complex social dynamic. Given that Brahma was Daksha's father, Brahma's realm was essentially Daksha's ancestral home. Had Shiva risen to greet Daksha upon his arrival, it would have been akin to a son-in-law welcoming his father-in-law in the latter's ancestral abode, a socially incongruous and potentially disrespectful act. Daksha's arrogance and pride, however, clouded his judgment. Unable to comprehend the subtleties of this social protocol, he interpreted Shiva's actions as a deliberate insult, overlooking their familial relationship. In contrast, the other deities, unbound by such intricate family ties, freely expressed their reverence for Daksha as a Prajapati.

Daksha's grudge against Shiva intensified after these incidents. With the primary motive of insulting Shiva, Daksha organized a grand yajna similar to the one conducted by Brahma. Sage Bhrigu was chosen to preside over the yajna. Daksha extended invitations to all the Adityas (Gods), Prajapatis, and kings, deliberately excluding Shiva and Sati.

Dadhichi-Daksha Argument: The Kurma Purana recounts the dialogues between Dadhichi and Daksha (Note: Sage Dadhichi is an embodiment of self-sacrifice, as mentioned in Puranas. Indra was able to make the Vajrayudha using Sage's bones and vanquish Vritra.) After the sacrifices and hymns were offered to the 12 Adityas, Dadhichi—one of the most revered sages—observed that no sacrificial portion (havish) had been allotted to Mahadeva (Shiva) and his wife. Furthermore, no Vedic hymns were used in the yajna to address Rudra, even though they were part of the Vedic tradition. Dadhichi warned Daksha that altering the Holy Vedas for personal reasons was unacceptable. The priests and other sages supported Dadhichi's stance. In response, Daksha not only refused to comply but also directed abusive words toward Shiva. As a result of this heated argument, Dadhichi left the yajna.

=== Sati's Arrival at the Ceremony ===
Sati learned about the grand yagna organized by her father. She requested Shiva's presence at the event. However, Shiva declined, explaining that attending an uninvited function would be ill-mannered. He reminded Sati that, after their marriage, she was now part of Shiva's family rather than Daksha's. Despite social norms, Sati felt a strong personal bond with her parents, leading her to believe that formal invitations were unnecessary. She persistently pleaded with Shiva to allow her to attend the ceremony, ignoring his reasons for not going himself. Eventually, Shiva permitted Sati to visit her parents, accompanied by Nandi, but he did not join her.

Upon reaching the ceremony, Sati tried to interact with her parents and sisters. Daksha, however, arrogantly avoided her. He repeatedly snubbed her in front of the dignitaries. Despite this, Sati maintained her composure. When Sati persisted in seeking interaction, Daksha reacted vehemently, insulting her publicly for attending an uninvited event. He even called Shiva an atheist and a dweller of cremation grounds. Daksha's planned humiliation of Sati and Shiva became unbearable for her. The shameless insults and humiliation pushed her to the brink.

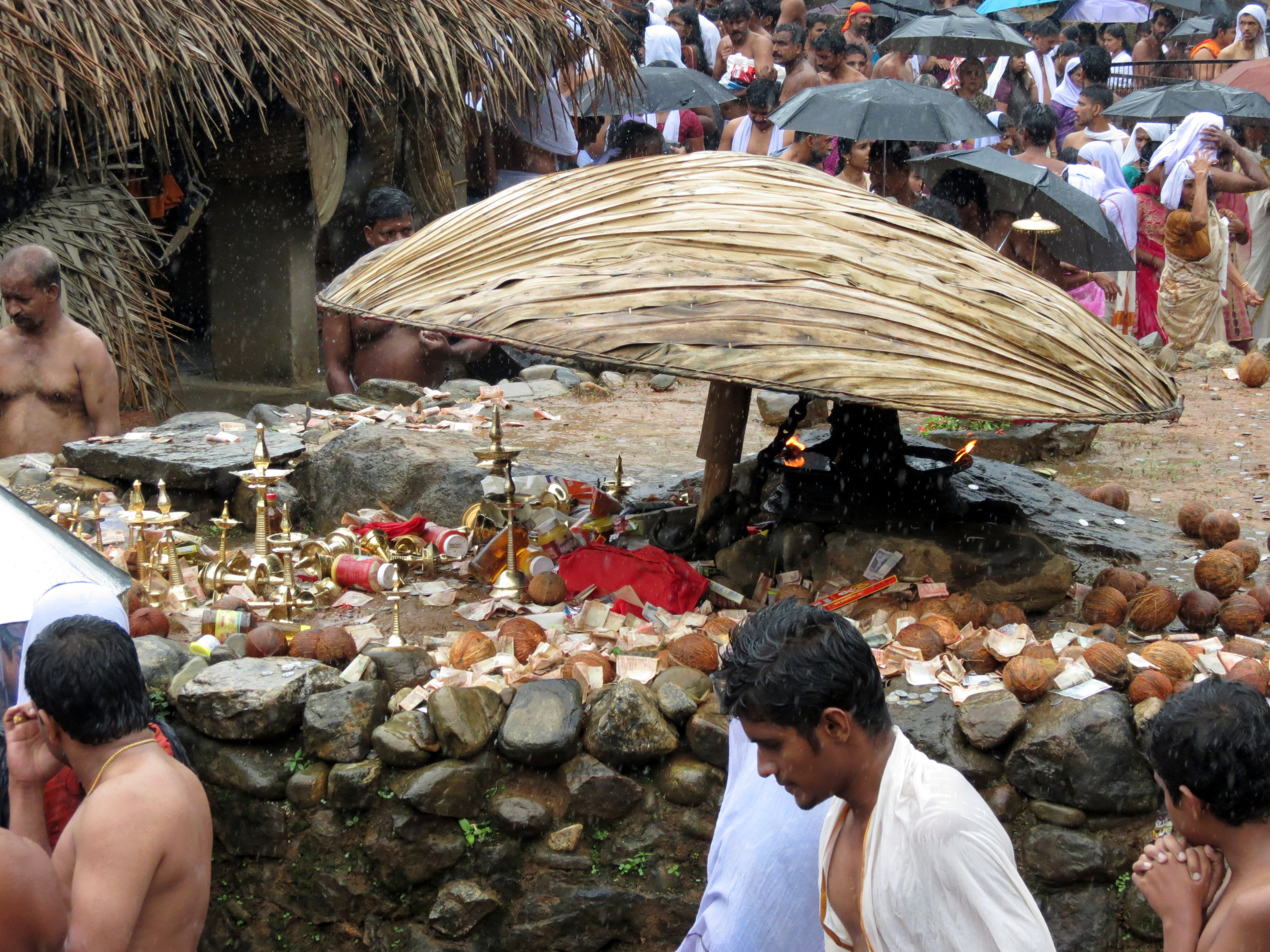
Ammarakkallu-The spot where Sati Devi immolated herself

In deep remorse, Sati cursed Daksha for mistreating his innocent daughter and her respected husband. She reminded him that his haughty behaviour had blinded his intellect. Sati cursed him, predicting that Shiva's wrath would destroy him and his empire. Unable to bear further humiliation, Sati tragically committed suicide by leaping into the sacrificial fire. The beloved daughter of the entire race was consumed by the flames.

Onlookers tried to save Sati, but it was too late. They found only her half-burnt body. The cherished progeny of Daksha's lineage, the source of their happiness, faded away, sacrificed to satisfy her father's pride. Daksha's prejudice against his son-in-law, Shiva, fueled immense hatred within him, ultimately leading to his daughter's demise.

After the incident, Nandi and the accompanying bhootas left the yajna site. Nandi cursed the participants, and Bhrigu responded by cursing the Bhootaganas in return.

=== The wrath of Shiva ===
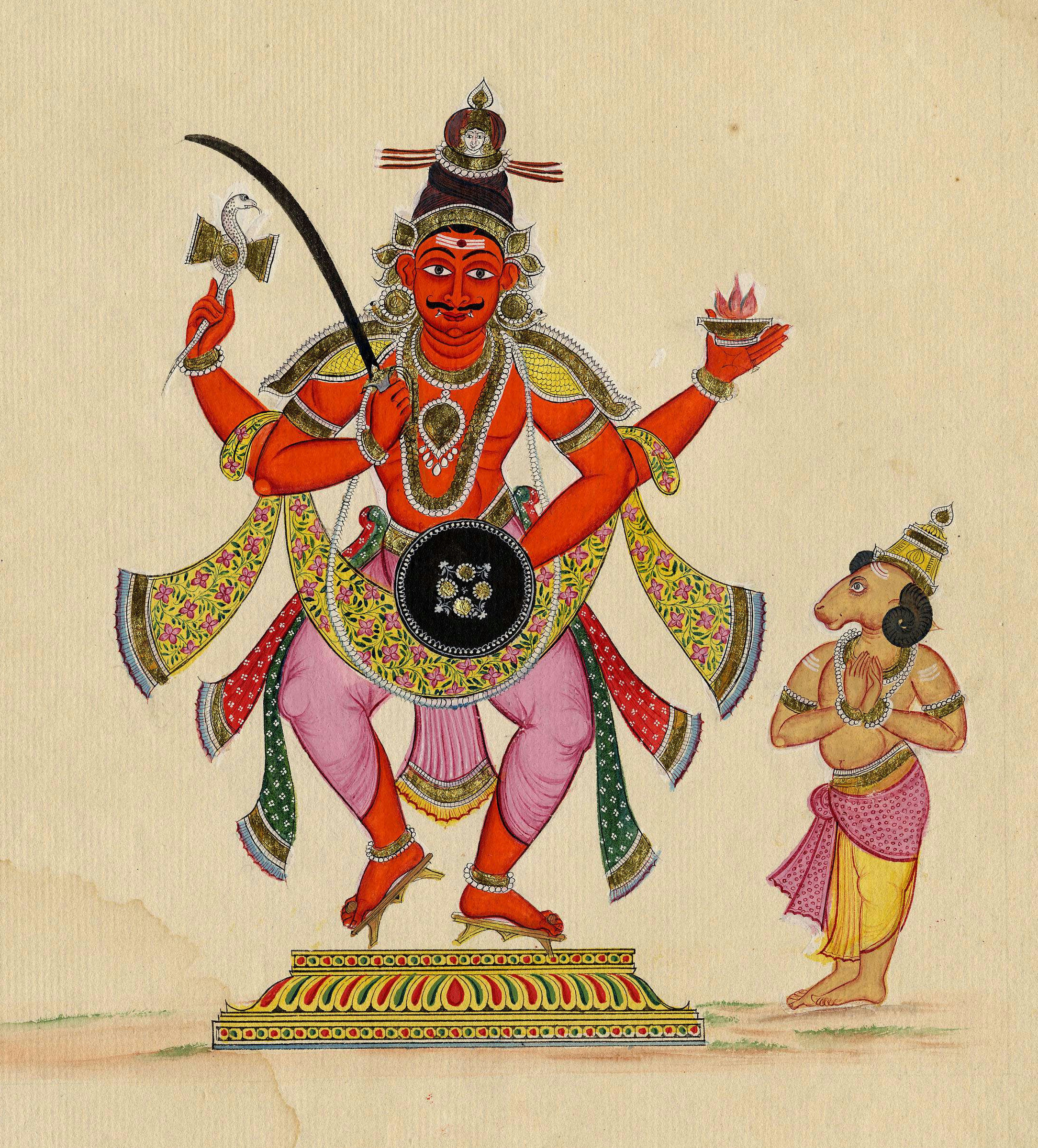
Veera Bhadra and Daksha

Upon hearing the shocking news of his wife's death, Shiva was consumed by grief and anger. He realized how Daksha had cunningly plotted against him, and it was his innocent wife who had fallen into the trap. Shiva learned about Daksha's callous treatment of Sati. Although Sati was once his beloved daughter, Daksha's ego and pride led him to force her into a dishonourable death. Shiva's rage intensified, and plucked a lock of hair from his head and smashed it on the ground, breaking it into two with his foot. From that act emerged the armed and fearsome Veerabhadra and Bhadrakali (as mentioned in the Vayu Purana). Shiva commanded them to kill Daksha and destroy the yajna.

The ferocious Veerabhadra, Bhadrakali, and the Bhutaganas marched south, launching a brutal assault on Daksha. His army was swiftly crushed and slaughtered, and they began destroying the Yajna surroundings. Like a hurricane sweeping through a city, people fled the turmoil, abandoning the ceremony. Sage Bhrigu, using his divine penance powers, created an army to resist Shiva's attack and protect the Yajna. However, Bhrigu's forces couldn't withstand the onslaught; they were demolished, and the entire area lay in ruins. Even the Prajapatis and Adityas (Gods) who participated suffered merciless beatings, wounds, or death. Daksha was captured and beheaded. As a final act of victory, the Bhutaganas plucked out Sage Bhrigu's white beard.

According to the Shaiva and Vaishnava Puranas, the mythology of Daksha Yajna concludes here. The remaining aspects of the story are found in the epilogues mentioned in Shakta Puranas like the Devi Bhagavatha Purana, Kalika Purana, and various regional folklores. The following account represents the Shaiva version, while the Vaishnava versions are also documented in the Notes section.

=== The sorrow of Shiva ===
The grand sacrificial ceremony, the yagna, had been disrupted and lay desolate. Recognizing that such an obstruction could wreak havoc and cause severe ill effects on nature, Brahma and Vishnu went to summon the grief-stricken Shiva to the Yajna site. They offered comfort and sympathy, urging him to come and pacify the bhutaganas, allowing the yagna to proceed. Shiva agreed, and together, the Trimurti arrived at the location. There, Shiva discovered the charred remains of his beloved wife. The poignant scene moved the world as they witnessed Shiva's heart-wrenching sorrow. Vishnu embraced his dear friend, Shiva, providing solace. Shiva granted permission to continue the yagna. Daksha was absolved by Shiva, and the head of a ram (male goat) meant for the yagna was placed upon Daksha's decapitated body, restoring his life. Thus, the yagna was completed.

=== Shiva Wandering with Sati's Corpse ===
Unable to part from his beloved wife, Shiva carried Sati's lifeless body and wandered across the land. Wherever her body parts fell during his journey, those locations became known as the Shakta pithas—51 in total, symbolizing the 51 Sanskrit alphabets. Shiva remained in isolation and solitude for ages until Sati Devi reincarnated as Shri Parvati, the daughter of King Himavana. Parvati renounced her royal privileges, retreated to the forest, and became known as ‘Aparna,’ the one without sustenance. Shiva tested her devotion in disguise, even attempting to dissuade her by speaking ill of himself. However, Parvati's unwavering love for Shiva prevailed. Eventually, Shiva recognized her as Uma, the same soul as Sati. He later married Shri Parvati as Sundareshwara.

== Vaishakha Festival rituals ==
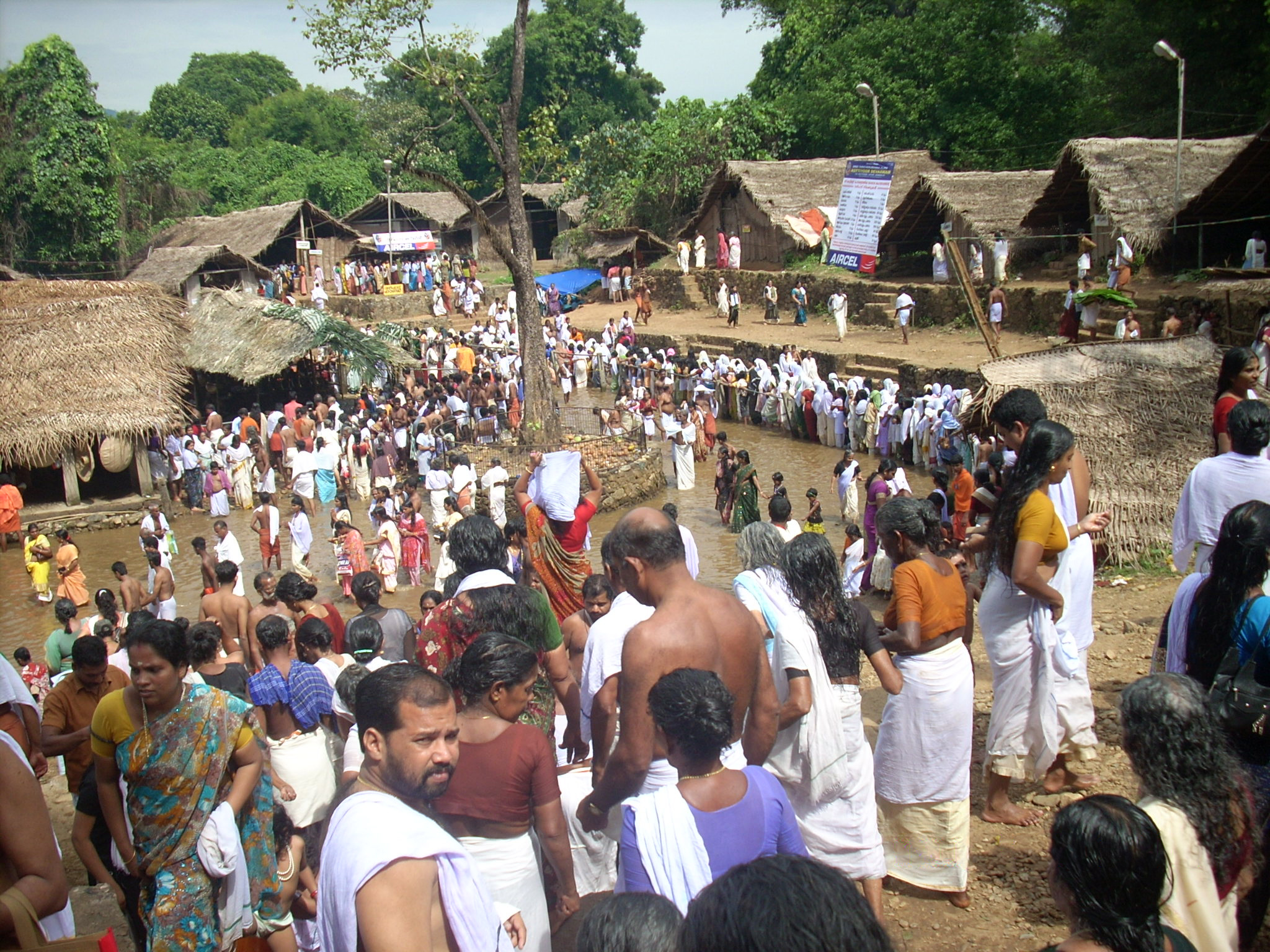
Akkare Kottiyoor

The Kottiyoor Vysakha Mahotsavam (Malayalam: കൊട്ടിയൂർ വൈശാഖ മഹോത്സവം) (Tamil: கோட்டியூர் வைசாக மகோற்சவம்)(Hindi: कोट्टीयुर वैशाख महोत्सव) festival rites are performed by akkare Kottiyoor temple on the east side of Vavali river.

Kottiyoor Ulsavam is conducted in the Tiruvanchira pond in rainy season where only hay thatched huts are allowed. The sacred pond is a spring and a tributary of the Vavali river and is an appealing environment - a reminder of ancient vedic times. Kottiyoor itself is a serene hilly area. It is believed that Bhutaganas brings the materials needed for the rituals from the Tirunelli MahaVishnu Temple (10 km south of Kottiyoor Temple) through the Brahmagiri valley. Kottiyoor Temple, as its name implies, is the meeting of the Trimurti - Brahma, Vishnu and Shiva. The Shivalinga of the Kottiyoor Temple is Swayambhu i.e. formed naturally. Kottiyoor Temple pilgrimage is a rarity where each community is given right to perform specific rituals and duties for their pilgrimage.

The ceremonies for the Kottiyoou Festival, performed in sequential order, are PurakkuvamMalayalam: പുരക്കുവം(പ്രാക്കുഴം, NeerezhunnallathuMalayalam: നീരെഴുന്നെള്ളത്, VavalikettuMalayalam: വാവലിക്കെട്ട്, Neyyattam Malayalam: നെയ്യാട്ടം, Bringing Agni and Ooda (Reed)Malayalam: ഓടയും അഗ്നിയും എഴുന്നെള്ളത്, "Vaal" EzhunnallathuMalayalam: വാൾ എഴുന്നള്ളത്, "Chothi Vilakku" Malayalam: ചോതിവിളക്ക്, "Naallam Thurakkal" Malayalam: നാളം തുറക്കൽ, "Bhandaram Ezhunnallathu" Malayalam: ഭണ്ഡാരം എഴുന്നെള്ളത്, Thiruvona Aaraadhana Malayalam: തിരുവോണ ആരാധന, Ilaneervaipu Malayalam: ഇളനീർ വെയ്പ്പ്, Ilaneerattam Malayalam: ഇളനീരാട്ടം, Revathi Aaraadhana Malayalam: രേവതി ആരാധന, Rohini Aaraadhana Malayalam: രോഹിണി ആരാധന, Thrikur Ariyalavu Malayalam: തൃക്കൂർ അരി അളവ്, Makam Malayalam: മകം, Kalam Varavu Malayalam: കളം വരവ്, Atham naal Malayalam: അത്തം നാൾ, Vallattom Malayalam: വാളാട്ടം, Thengaeru Malayalam: തേങ്ങ ഏറു, Chithra naal Malayalam: ചിത്ര നാൾ, Thrikkaleshattam Malayalam: തൃക്കലശാട്ടം, Thandilmeil Oonu Malayalam: തണ്ടിന്മേൽ ഒന്നു, Vaal madakkam Malayalam: വാൾ മടക്കം, Valiya Vattalam Payasam Malayalam: വലിയ വട്ടളം പായസം, Purakkuvam (Prakuzham, Purakuzham)Malayalam: പുരക്കുവം (പ്രാക്കുഴം, പുരക്കുഴം)

Rohini Aradhana is an important ceremony performed by the Kurumathoor Nayikan Brahman, the head of a local Vaishnavite family who holds the birthright for this ritual. Considered a representation of Vishnu, the Bhattatirippad conducts the ceremony with the assistance of a Namboothiri priest. The highlight of the ritual is the Alingana Pushpanjali, where the Bhattatirippad embraces the Swayambhu Shivalinga. This act commemorates the mythological event during Daksha Yaga when Shiva was inconsolable after witnessing Sati's tragic demise. The Rohini Aradhana serves as a symbolic representation of Vishnu comforting the grief-stricken Shiva.

=== Entry of Parashurama ===
Ages after the dreadful incident and havoc, carrying Sati Devi's tears and curse, the land started being governed by Kali (the personification of Kali Yuga, the reigning power of calamity). Kerala was submerged under water. Parashurama, who donated all his conquered land to Brahmins, needed a place to live. At the request of Varuna, he threw his axe from Gokarna to Kanyakumari and Kerala reemerged from the sea. Parashurama was attacked by Kali in Kottiyoor. He overpowered Kali and, as he raised his axe to kill him, the Trimurti materialised there and stopped Parashurama. He released Kali on the condition that he would never ever come into the premises of the Swyam Bhuu Linga of his Guru, Shiva, in Kottiyoor. He started the twenty-seven-day festival to remember the incidents that happened in the place.

=== Exclusiveness in rites ===
- Usha pooja is only for twenty-four days to match with the standard yaga period. However the rest of the pooja is conducted for all twenty-seven days.
- The quantity of Nivedyam is fixed as in ancient time. It not increased proportional to an increase in the number of pilgrims.
- No pooja is performed at Ammarakkal (Sati Devi's self-immolation site) only Pushpanjali and Nivedyam is offered.
- Punyaham is never performed, as the location is blessed with the congruence of the Shaiva, Shakta, Vaishnava divinities. Kottiyoor is so pure that all impurities are washed away. The location is the origin of a spring which form part of the Vavali River. The festival takes place during the rainy season.
- Ganapathi Homam is performed every day in morning.
- The whole premises is a temporary shelter and it is a replica of the ancient Vedic worship and culture, thousands of years ago. Unlike most pilgrimage sites there is no permanent temple structure. The pradakshinam (circumambualtion) is through a pond.
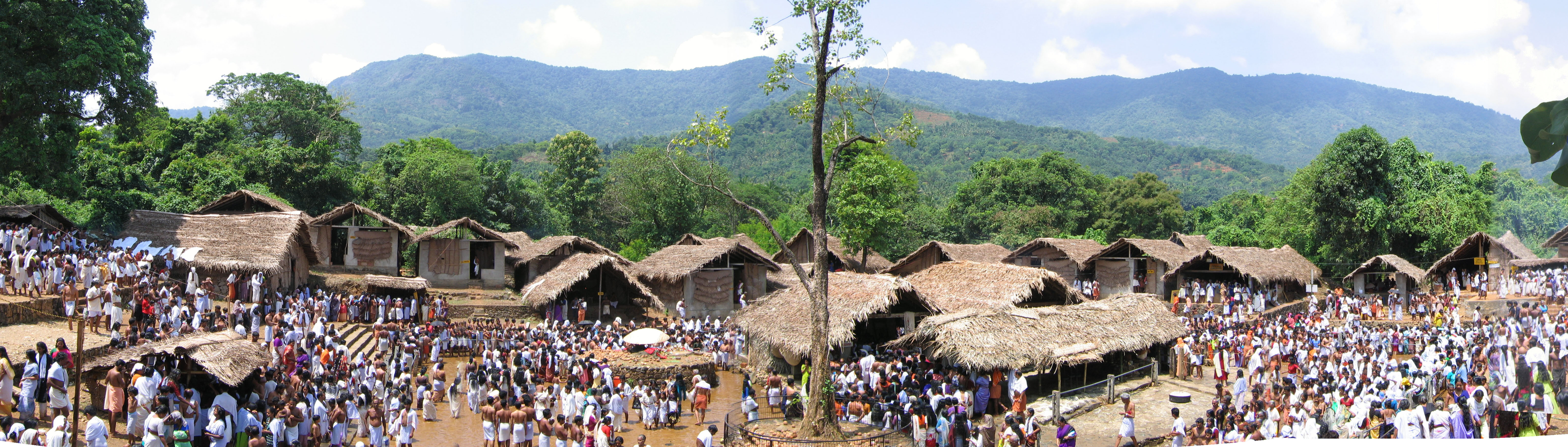
A panoramic view of Ikkare kottiyoor, The Kottiyoor Vyshakha Mahotsavam

== Access ==
The national highway passes through Kannur town. Mangalore and Mumbai can be accessed on the northern side and Cochin and Thiruvananthapuram can be accessed on the southern side. The road to the east of Iritty connects to Mysore and Bangalore. The nearest railway station is Kannur on Mangalore-Palakkad line and the nearest airport is Kannur International Airport.

== Image gallery ==
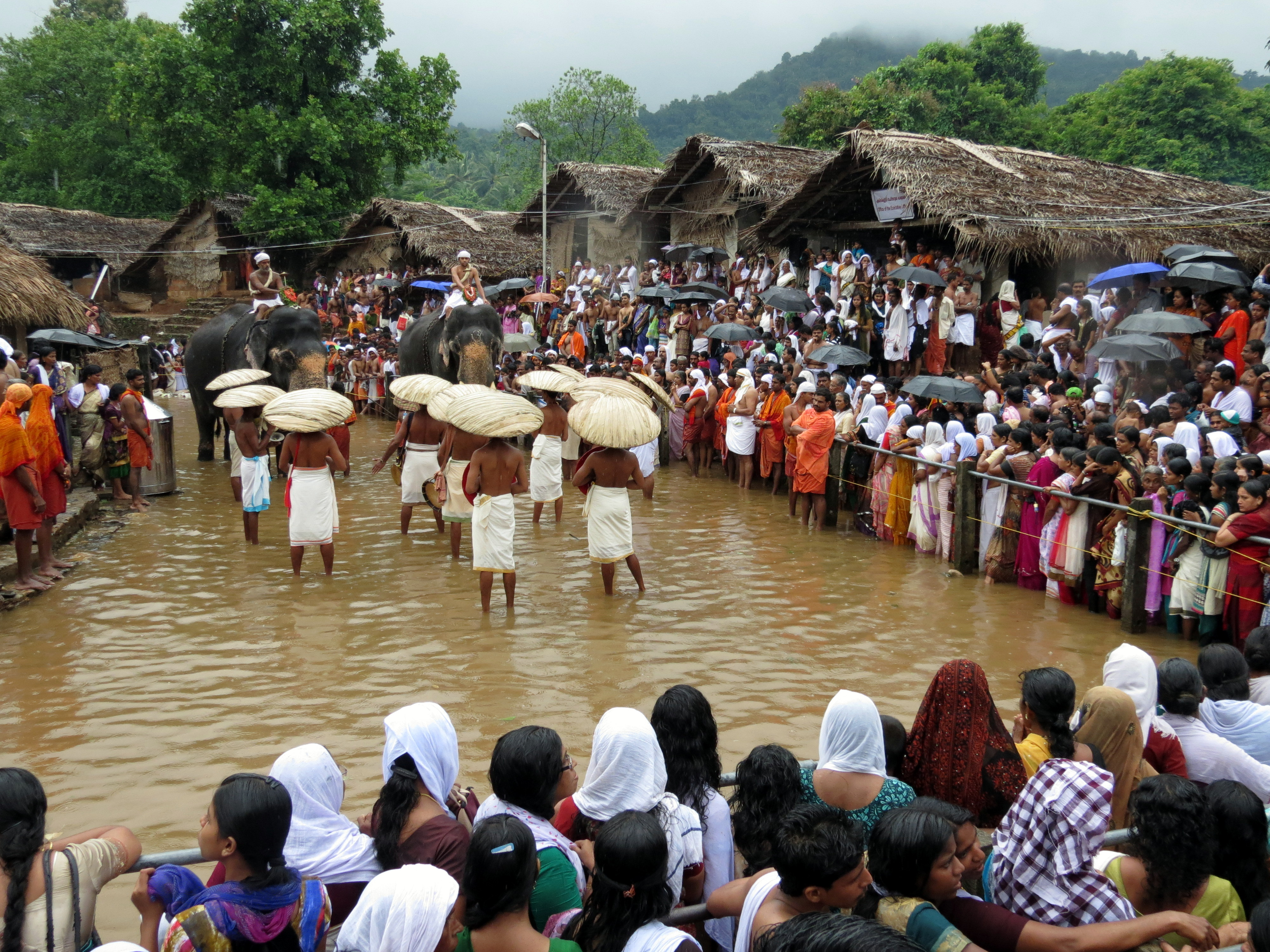
Festival Time

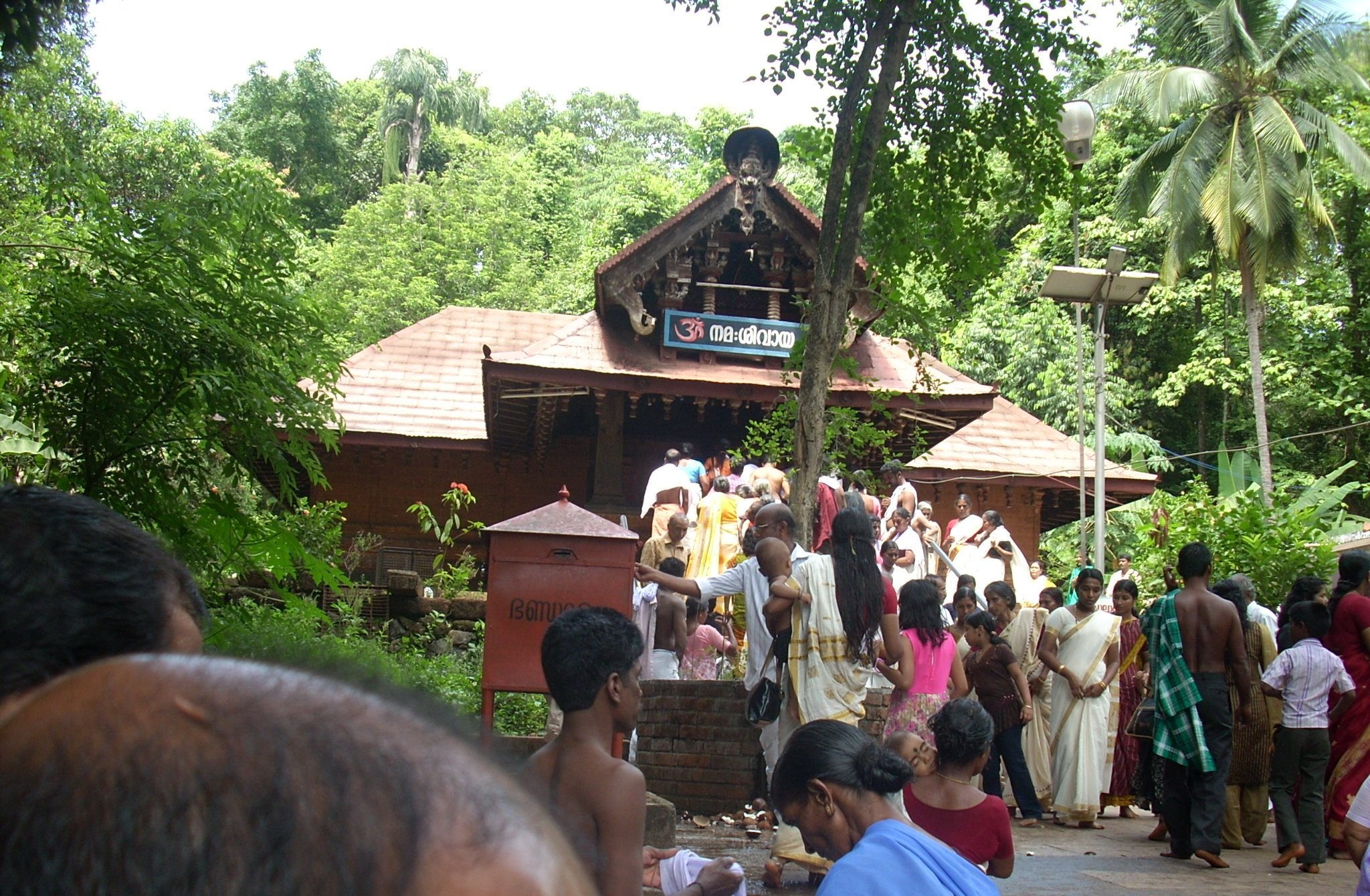
Ikkare Kottiyur

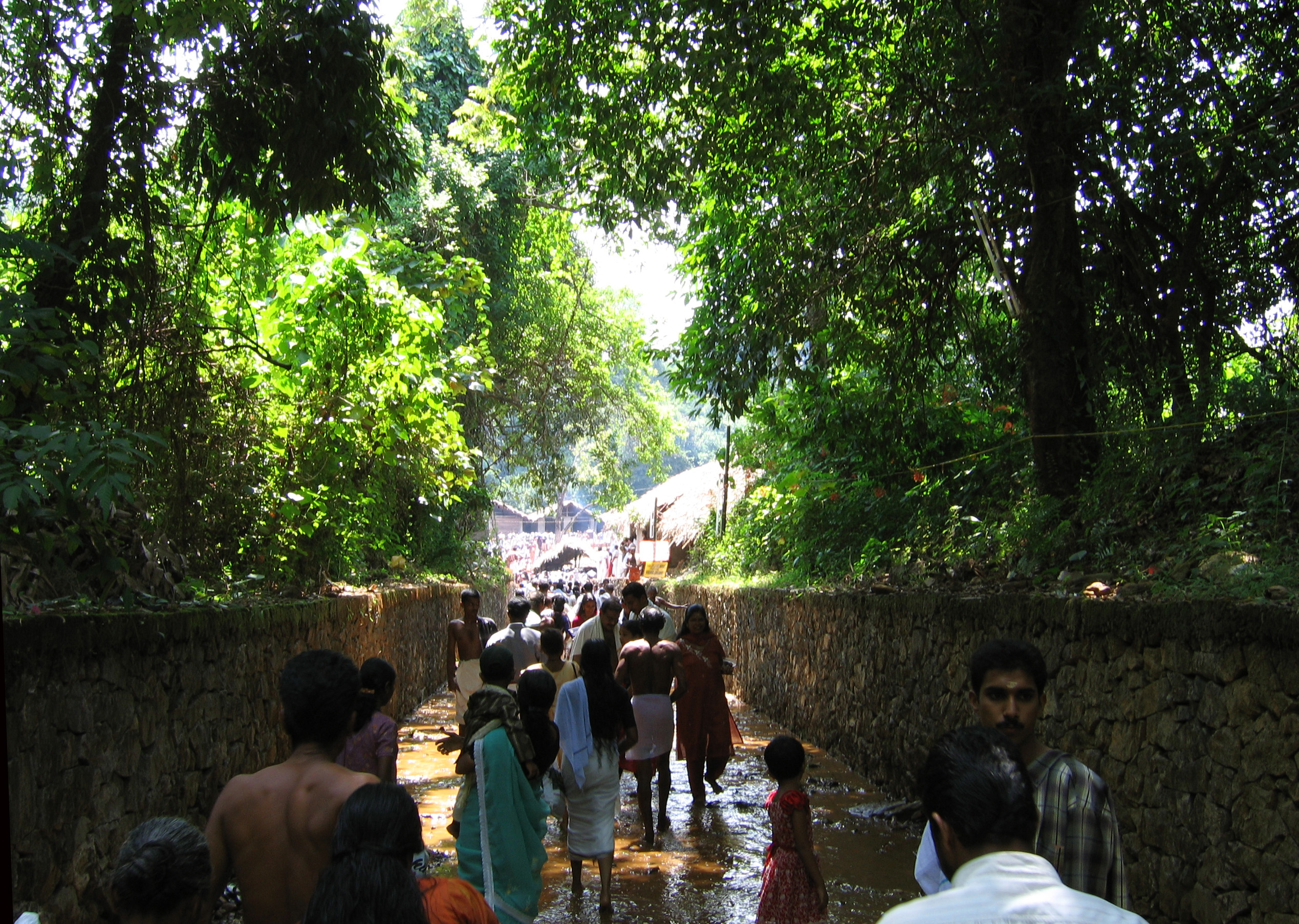
Entry to Akkare

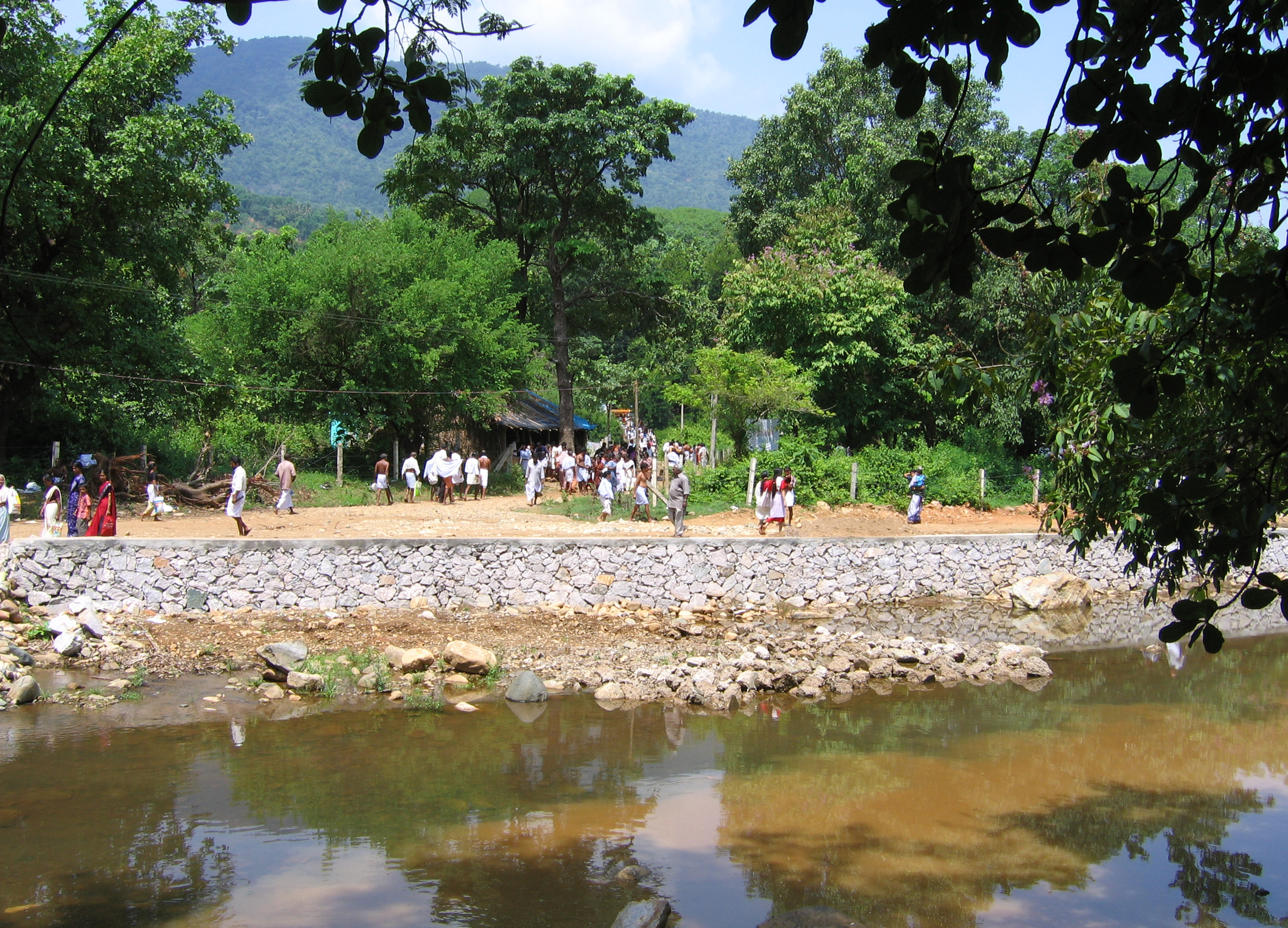
Going to Akkare Kottiyur

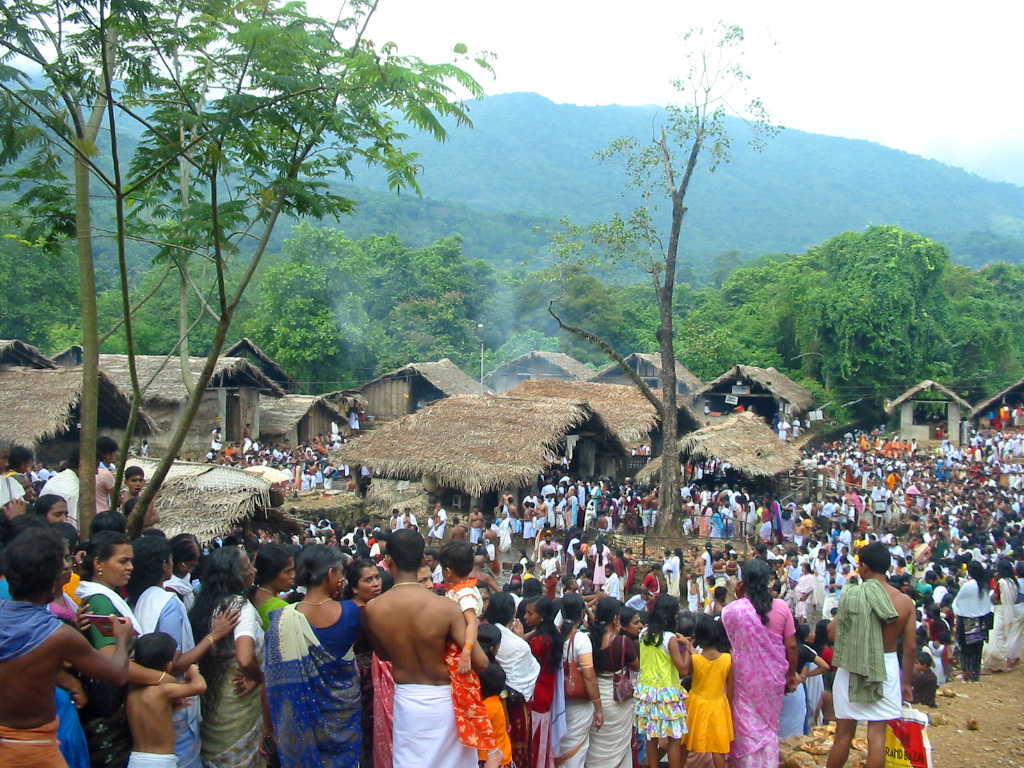
festival view

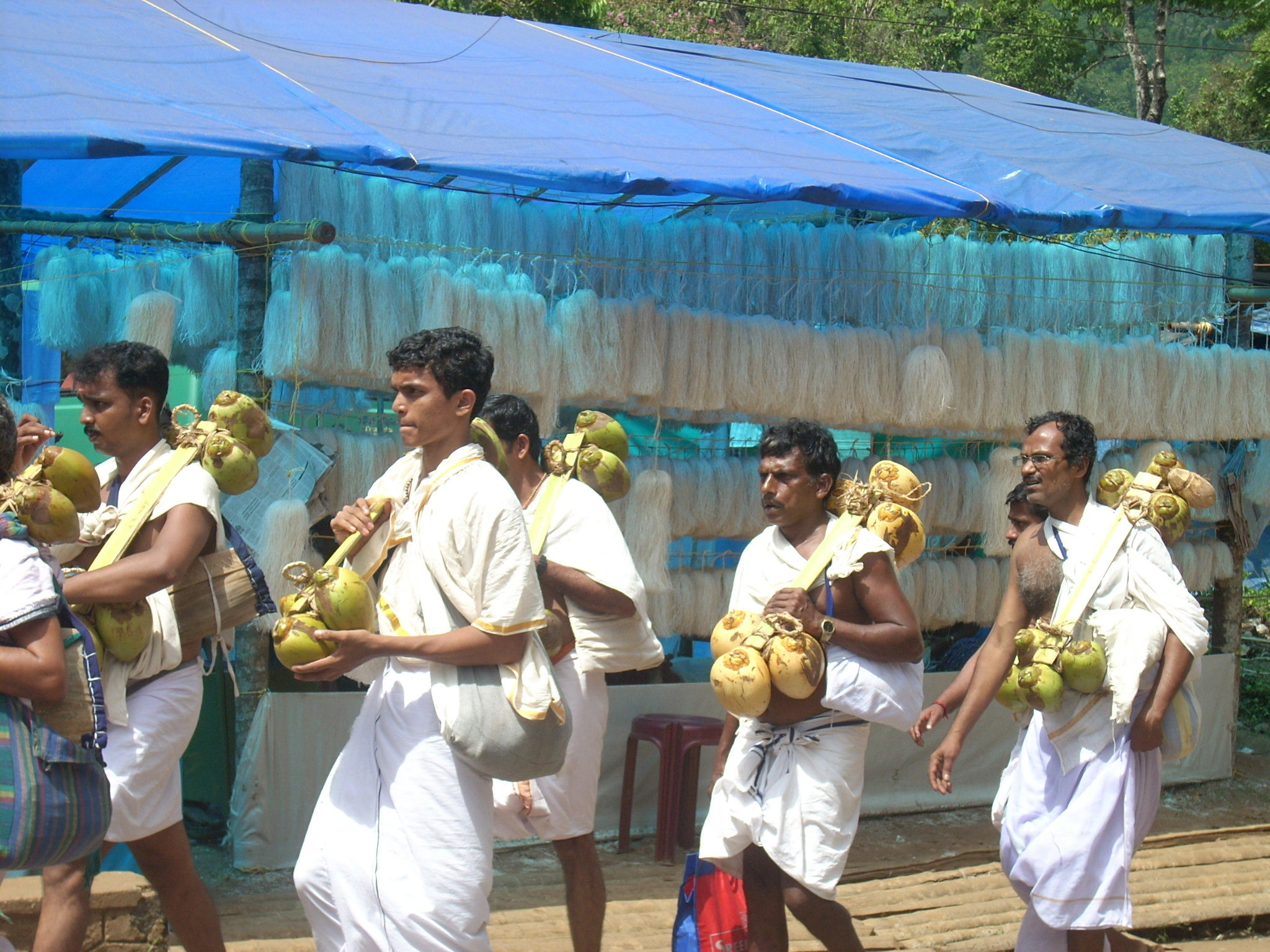
Bringing Tender Coconuts

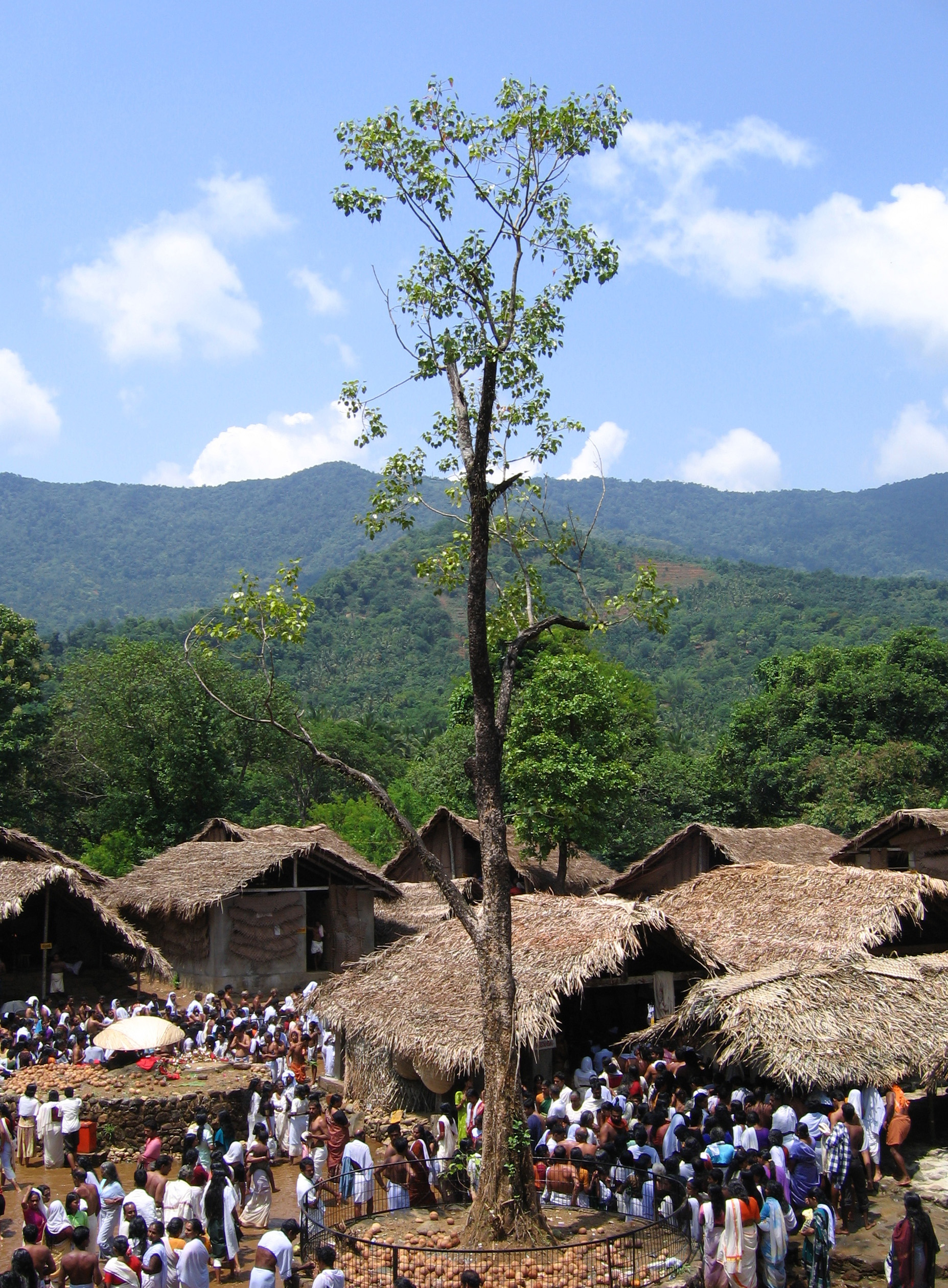
The Peepal Tree

== See also ==
- Virabhadra-Daksha
- Shaivism-Shaktism
- Shiva-Sati-Shakta pithas
- Kottiyoor, Thalassery, Kerala
- Kottiyoor Vadakkeshwaram Temple-Tirunelli Temple

== Bibliography of notable offline sources ==
- Ancient Indian Tradition and Mythology: Mahapuranas-The Vayu Purana. UNESCO Heritage Publishing, (United Nations Organization). 1987. ISBN 9231030175.
- Wilson, H.H. (4 November 2008). The Vishnu Purana - Vol I. Hesperides Press. ISBN 978-1443722636.
- Ramesh Menon (2011). Siva: The Siva Purana Retold (1, Fourth Re-print ed.). Rupa and Co. ISBN 978-8129114952.
- Müller, F. Max (26 July 2004). The Upanishads Part II: The Sacred Books of the East Part Fifteen. Kessinger Publishing, LLC. ISBN 1417930160.
- Vijnanananda, Swami (2007). The Srimad Devi Bhagavatam. Munshiram Maniharlal. ISBN 978-8121505918.
- Dallapiccola, Anna L (2002). Dictionary of Hindu Lore and Legend. Thames & Hudson. ISBN 0500510881.
