= Kandakkai =

- Interactive map of Kandakkai
- Coordinates: 12.01817°N 75.44346°E
- Country: India
- State: Kerala
- District: Kannur
- Time zone: UTC+5:25 (IST)
- PIN: 670602
- Telephone code: 0460
- Vehicle registration: KL-59 (Thaliparamba Sub RTA)

Kandakkai is a local village in local body of Mayyil grama panchayat kannur district Kerala, India, famous for farmers resistance against British colonial government, very strong belt of leftist politics and CPIM.

== Transportation ==
Nearest national highway passes through NH 66 Valapattanam and Dharmasala. Goa and Mumbai can be accessed on the northern side and Cochin and Thiruvananthapuram can be accessed on the southern side. The road to the east of Iritty connects to Mysore and Bangalore. The nearest railway station is Kannur on Mangalore-Palakkad line. Trains are available to almost all parts of India subject to advance booking over the internet. There are airports at KIAL Mattanur, Mangalore and Calicut. All of them are international airports but direct flights are available only to Middle East countries.
