= Narath =

- Census Town
- Location in Kerala, India Narath (India)
- Coordinates: 11.940045°N 75.394932°E
- Country: India
- State: Kerala
- District: Kannur

Government
  - Type: Panchayati raj (India)
  - Body: Narath Grama Panchayat

Area
  - Total: 8.29 km^{2} (3.20 sq mi)

Population (2011)
  - Total: 13,092
  - Density: 1,580/km^{2} (4,090/sq mi)

Languages
  - Official: Malayalam, English
- Time zone: UTC+5:30 (IST)
- ISO 3166 code: IN-KL
- Vehicle registration: KL-13

Narath is a census town in Kannur district in the Indian state of Kerala.

== Demographics ==
As of 2011 Census, Narath had a population of 13,092, which constitutes 5,979 (45.7%) males and 7,113 (54.3%) females. Narath Census Town spreads over an area of 8.29 km^{2} (3.20 sq mi) with 2,557 families residing in it. The male female sex ratio was 1,190 higher than state average of 1,084. In Narath, 12.6% of the population is under 6 years of age. Narath had overall literacy ratio of 93%, higher than the national average of 74% and lower than the state average of 94%. The male literacy stands at 97.3% and female literacy at 90.5%.

== Religion ==
As of 2011 India Census, Narath census town had total population of 13,092, among which 53.34% are Hindus, 46.14% are Muslims and 0.52% others.

== Transportation ==
The national highway passes through Valapattanam town. Goa and Mumbai can be accessed on the northern side and Cochin and Thiruvananthapuram can be accessed on the southern side. The road to the east of Iritty connects to Mysore and Bangalore. The nearest railway station is Kannur on Mangalore-Palakkad line. Trains are available to almost all parts of India subject to advance booking over the internet. There are airports at Mattanur, Mangalore and Calicut. All of them are international airports but direct flights are available only to Middle Eastern countries.
