= Chengalai =

- village
- Location in Kerala, India Chengalai (India)
- Coordinates: 12.04°N 75.46°E
- Country: India
- State: Kerala
- District: Kannur

Government
  - Type: Panchayati raj (India)
  - Body: Chengalai Grama Panchayat

Area
  - Total: 21.18 km^{2} (8.18 sq mi)

Population (2011)
  - Total: 15,800
  - Density: 746/km^{2} (1,930/sq mi)

Languages
  - Official: Malayalam, English
- Time zone: UTC+5:30 (IST)
- PIN: 670631
- Telephone code: 0460
- ISO 3166 code: IN-KL
- Vehicle registration: KL 59
- Nearest city: Sreekandapuram
- Lok Sabha constituency: Kannur
- Vidhan Sabha constituency: Irikkur

Chengalayi is a village in Kannur district in the Indian state of Kerala. The village is also known as Chengalayi.

== Demographics ==
As of 2011 India census, Chengalai had a population of 15,800 with 7,462 males (47.2%) and 8,338 females (52.8%). Chengalai village spreads over an area of 21.18 km^{2} with 3,270 families residing in it. The male female sex ratio was 1,117 higher than state average of 1,084. In Chengalai, 12.5% of the population was under 6 years age. Chengalai had overall literacy of 92.7% lower than state average of 94%.

== Transportation ==
The national highway passes through Taliparamba town. Mangalore and Mumbai can be accessed on the northern side and Cochin and Thiruvananthapuram can be accessed on the southern side. The road to the east connects to Mysore and Bangalore. The nearest railway station is Kannur on Mangalore-Palakkad line. There are airports at Mattannur, Kannur

== See also ==
- Koyyam
