= Koyyam =

- village
- Interactive map of Koyyam
- Coordinates: 12.04°N 75.46°E
- Country: India
- State: Kerala
- District: Kannur
- Taluk: Taliparamba

Government
  - Body: Chengalayi Grama panchayat

Languages
  - Official: Malayalam, English
- Time zone: UTC+5:30 (IST)
- PIN: 670142
- ISO 3166 code: IN-KL
- Vehicle registration: KL-59
- Assembly constituency: Irikkur
- Lok Sabha constituency: Kannur
- Climate: cool (Köppen)

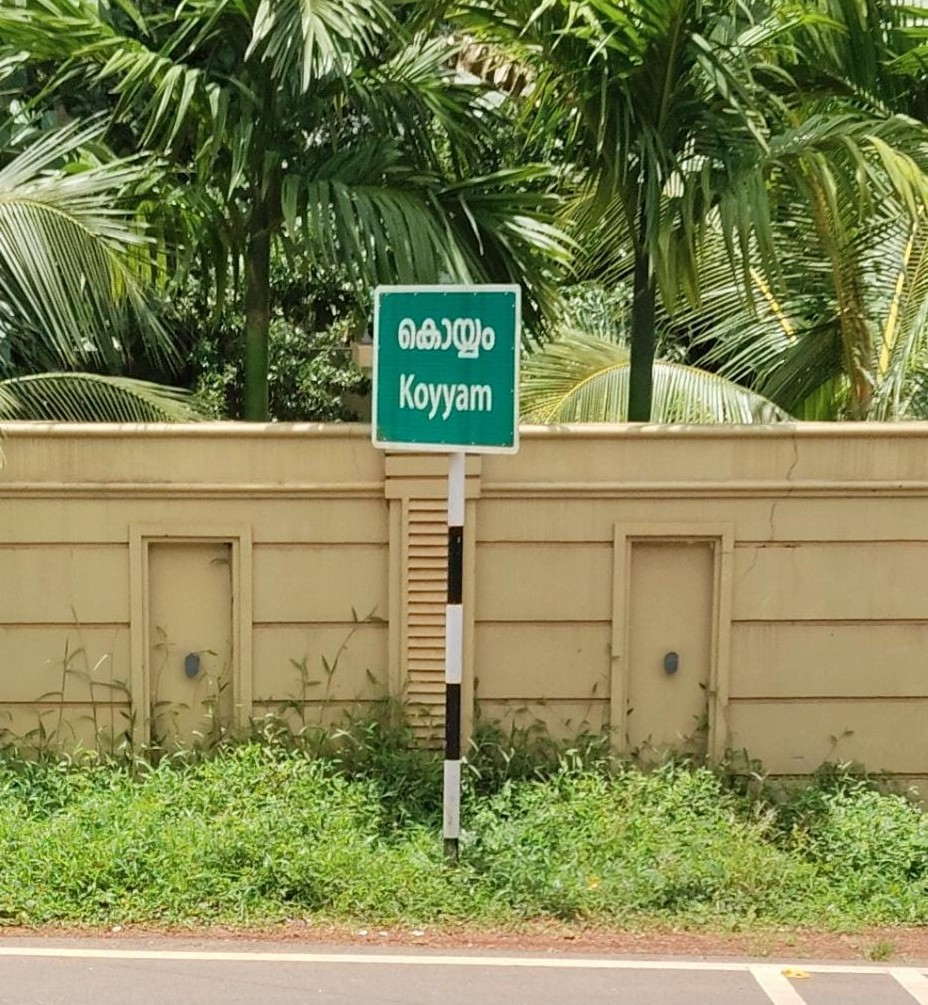

Koyyam is a town part of Chengalai panchayat, Kannur district, in the state of Kerala on the southwestern coast of India.

== History ==
The area that now comprises Kannur was once part of the Chera dynasty, a prominent southern kingdom ruling Kerala between the 9th and 12th centuries. Following that era, the Mooshaka dynasty—later known as the Kolathiris—rose to prominence, governing the region, including areas around Koyyam. Their kingdom engaged in extensive trade with Persia and Arabia during the 12th and 13th centuries.

Medieval travelers such as Marco Polo, Faxian, and Ibn Battuta mentioned and visited the region around Kannur, reflecting its significance in trade and culture. The area was even referred to as “Naura” in ancient Greek texts such as the Periplus of the Erythraean Sea, underscoring its maritime importance.

Name of the Koyyam River / Valapattanam River was Khritha Thadini and it is mentioned in Puranas and Ithihasas. The meaning of the Sanskrit Word is - Khritham means Milk and Thadini means River.

During the British Raj era, the Uppu Satyagraha Salt March was supported by people from Koyyam.

== Places of Interest Nearby ==
- Maha Vishnu Kshetram.Koyyam
- Puthiya Bhagavathi Kavu.Koyyam
- Muthappan Temple.Parassinikkadavu
- Maha Ganapathi Temple.Velam
- Paithalmala Tourism
- Rajarajeshwara Temple Taliparamba
- Kottiyoor Temple
- Madayi Kavu
- Parassinikkadavu Snake Park, Parassinikkadavu.

== Transportation ==
Regularly scheduled buses are available from Kannur town through Taliparamba and Mayyil to Koyyam. The national highway passes through Valapattanam town/ Puthiya theru Jn or the new Kannur Bypass can be accessed at Kottakkunnu/ Mundayad/ Pulluppi Kadavu Goa and Mumbai can be accessed on the northern side and Cochin and Thiruvananthapuram can be accessed on the southern side. The road to the east of Iritty connects to Mysore and Bangalore. The nearest railway station is Kannur on Mangalore-Palakkad line. Trains are available to almost all parts of India subject to advance booking over the internet. There are airports nearby are at Mattanur, Mangalore and Calicut. All of them are international airports. direct flights are available to different countries and different states in India. Kannur International Airport is 20 to 25 km distance řrom Koyyam.
