= Valapattanam =

Subrub in Kerala, India

- Census Town/Suburb
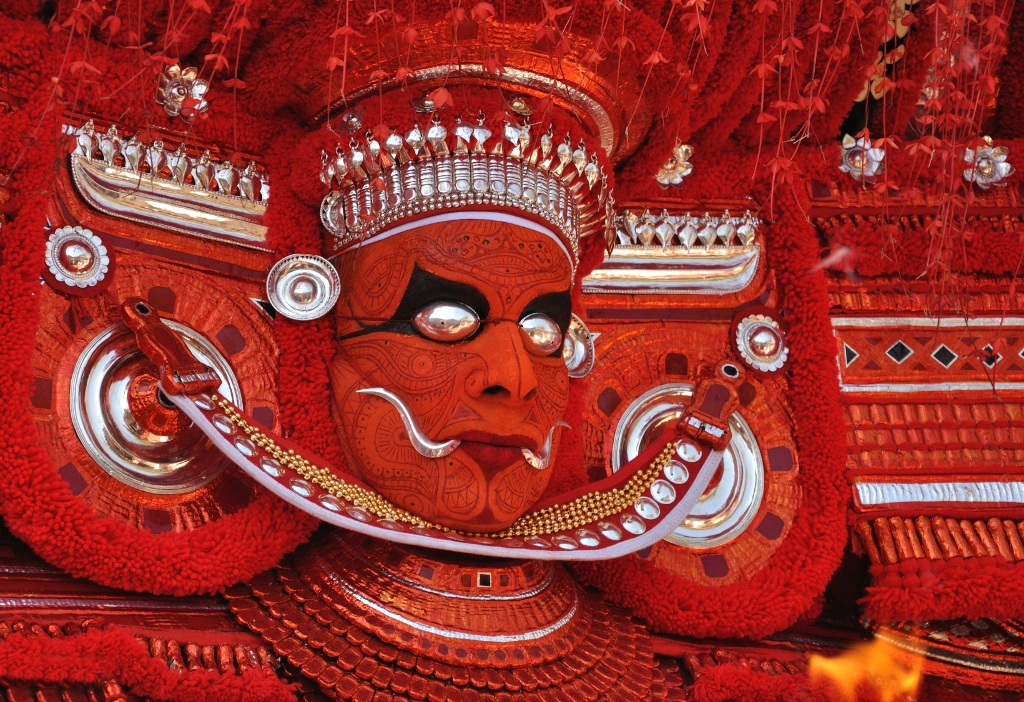
- Muchilottu Bhagavathi Theyyam
- Interactive map of Valapattanam
- Coordinates: 11°55′38″N 75°20′47″E
- Country: India
- State: Kerala
- District: Kannur

Government
  - Type: Panchayat raj
  - Body: Valapattanam Grama Panchayat

Area
  - Total: 2.04 km^{2} (0.79 sq mi)
- Elevation: 6 m (20 ft)

Population (2011)
  - Total: 7,955
  - Density: 3,900/km^{2} (10,100/sq mi)

Languages
  - Official: Malayalam, English
- Time zone: UTC+5:30 (IST)
- ISO 3166 code: IN-KL
- Vehicle registration: KL-13

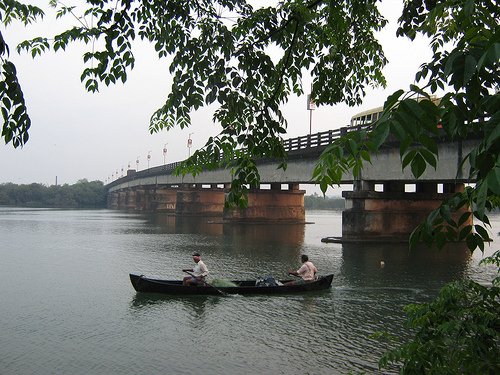
Valapattanam Bridge

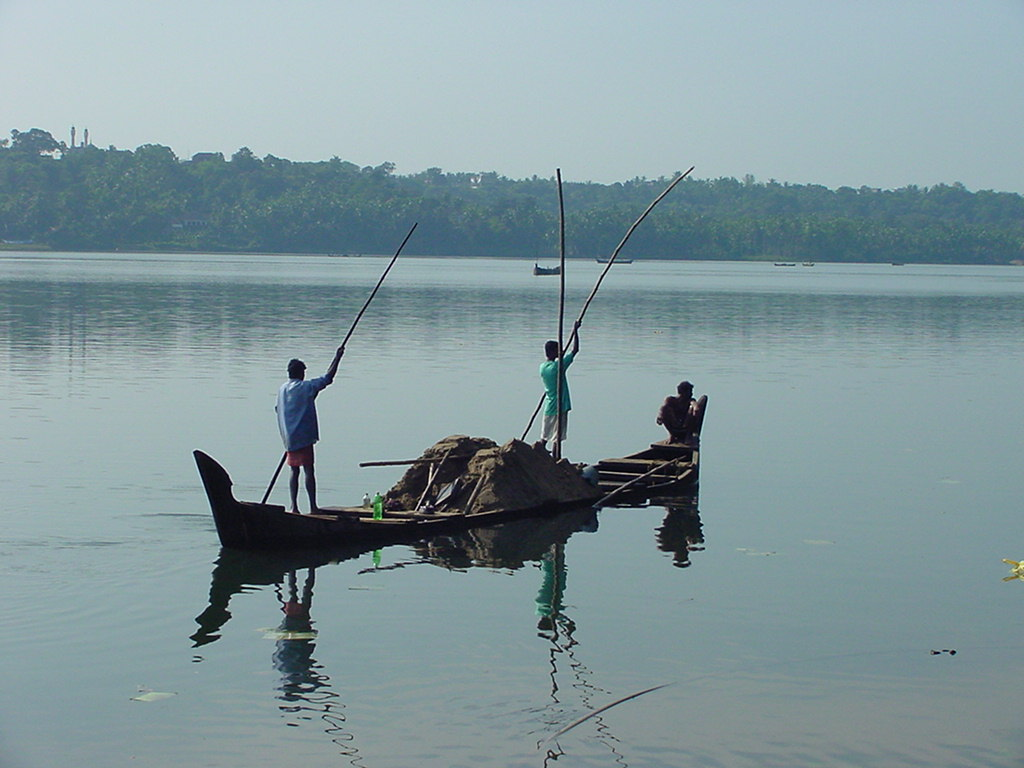
Sand Mining

Kalari Vathukkal Temple

Valapattanam is a census town and a suburb of Kannur city in the Kannur district, located in the Indian state of Kerala. It is also the smallest panchayat in Kerala with an area of 2.04 km^{2} (0.79 sq mi). It is located about 7 km (4.3 mi) north of Kannur towards Taliparamba. Valapattanam is known for its communal harmony. On one side is Kalarivathukkal Temple and on the other bank there is "Kakkulangara Mosque".

== Etymology ==
This town is also known as Balyapattanam. This town is situated on the banks of the Valapattanam river. Centuries back Valapattanam River (വളപട്ടണം പുഴ ) was the main ship route for trading and Valapattanam was the main town, because of this the town got this referred as "Valya pattanam" which means "big town" in Malayalam language.

== History ==
This town is named after its historical founder Vallabha II of the Mooshika dynasty (Kolathiri family) and was originally known as Vallabha-Pattanam and served as the capital of the Mooshika dynasty during the medieval ages. The fourteenth-century narrative of Ibn Battuta refers to the ruler of Ezhimala as residing at Baliapatanam and offers a clue that by this time, the centre of the political authority had shifted from Ezhimala to Baliapatanam. It is also possible that the 'Budfattan' visited by Abraham Ben Yiju, a Jewish merchant who lived in Mangalore in the 1230s and 1240s, was also Valapattanam. In the sixteenth century AD, a Portuguese official Duarte Barbosa also mentions Baliapatanam (Baliapatam in European records) as the residence of the ‘king of Cannanore’.

== Commerce ==
Western India Plywoods Ltd., the largest wood-based industry in the country and once Asia's biggest plywood factory is located on the bank of Valapattanam River. Apart from the dense presence of booming plywood and timber based industries, Valapattanam has small scale sand mining and fisheries activities. Warehouses of many prominent industries in Kannur is situated at Valapattanam.

== Religion ==
Known for its communal harmony and tradition of peaceful coexistence, numerous religious centers with centuries of tradition is located here.

The Muthappan temple is on the bank of Valapattanam river.

== Geography ==
Valapattanam is located at 11.9°N 75.37°E. It has an average elevation of 6 metres (19 feet).

== Suburbs and villages ==
- Manna, Valappattanam

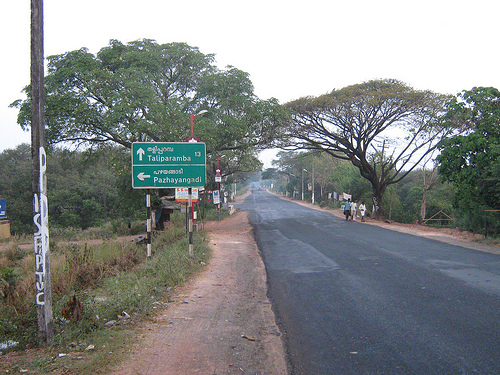
Valapattanam Junction

== Demographics ==
The Valapattanam Census Town has population of 7,955 of which 3,677 are males while 4,278 are females as per report released by Census India 2011.

Children aged 0 to 6 years number 1077, which is 13.54 % of the population. The female sex ratio is 1163 against state average of 1084. The child sex ratio is around 962 compared to Kerala state average of 964. Literacy rate of Valapattanam city is 95.43%, higher than state average of 94.00%. The male literacy is around 97.15% while female literacy rate is 94.00%.

Valapattanam census town has total administration over 1,329 houses to which it supplies basic amenities like water and sewage. It is also authorize to build roads within census town limits and impose taxes on properties coming under its jurisdiction.

== Images ==
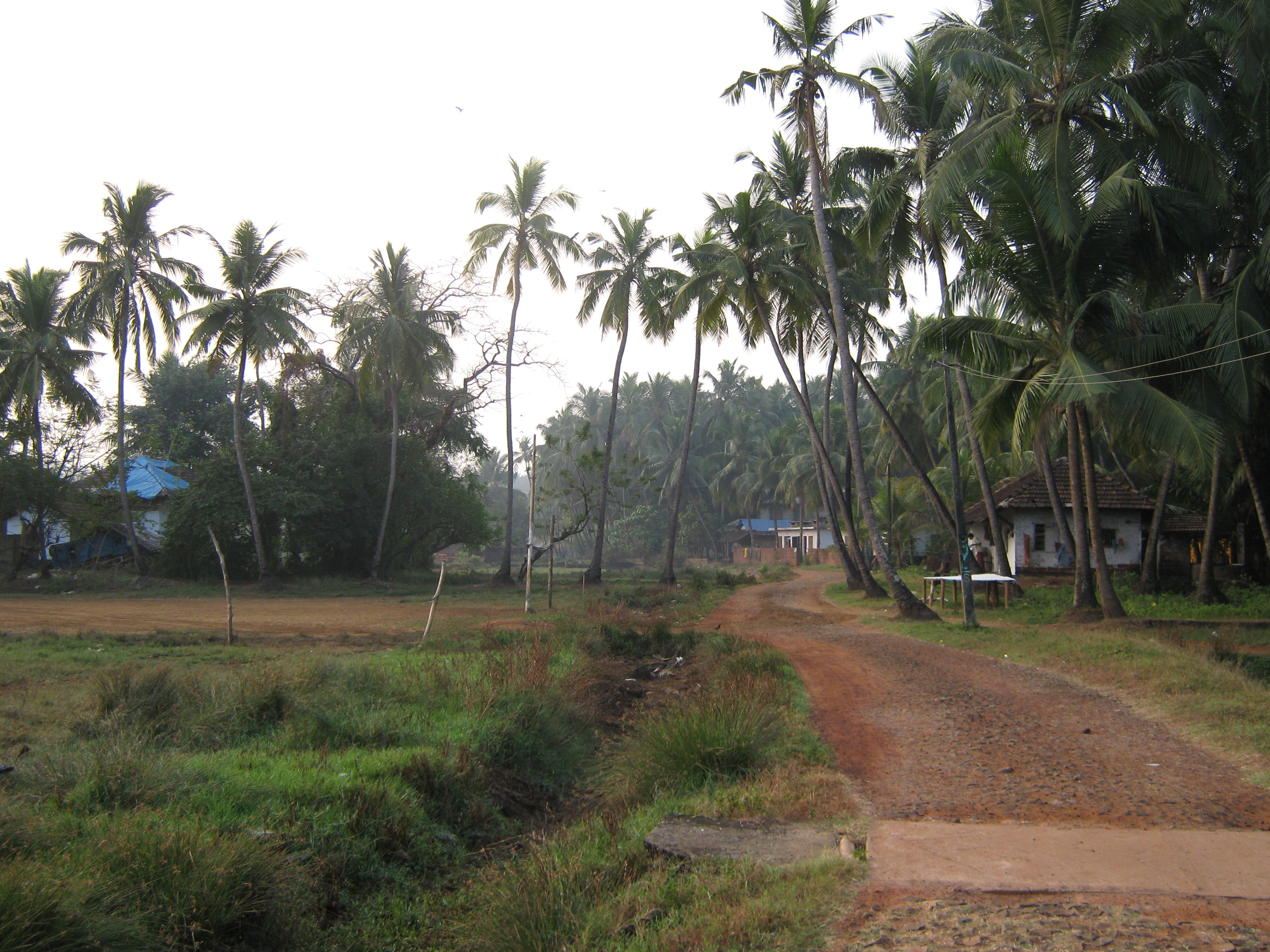
Village footpath

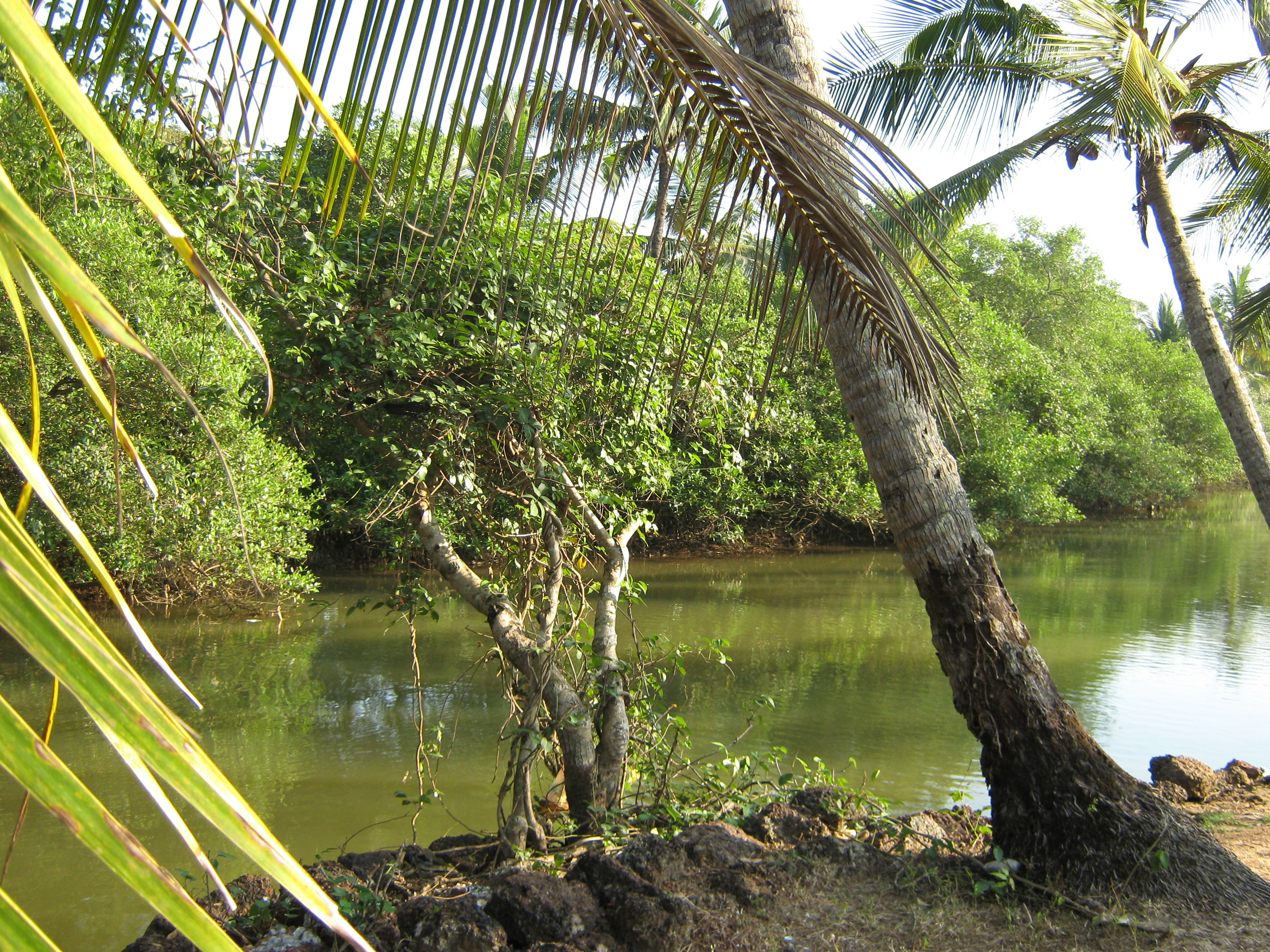
Coconut in serenity

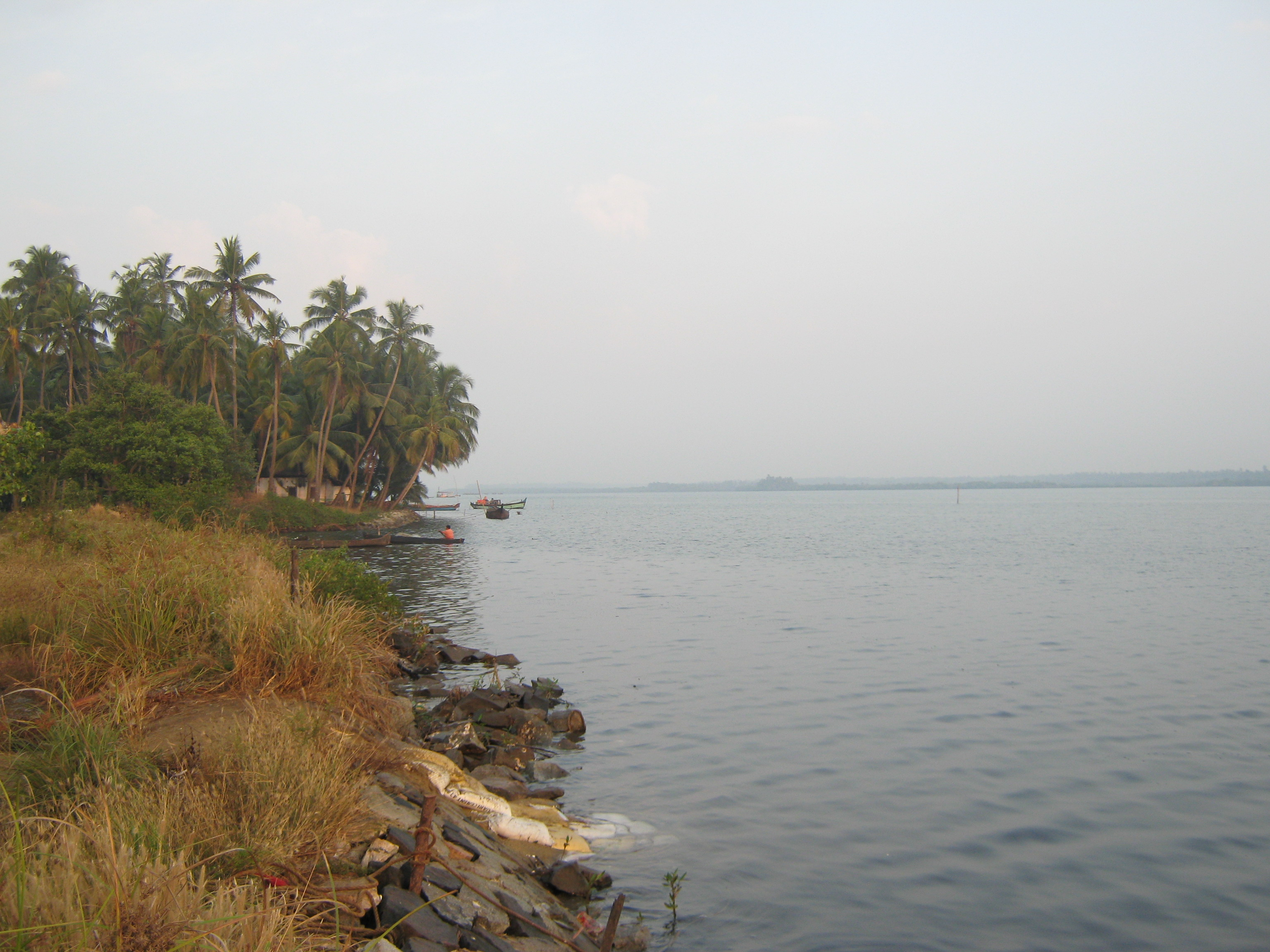
Poithum Kadavu

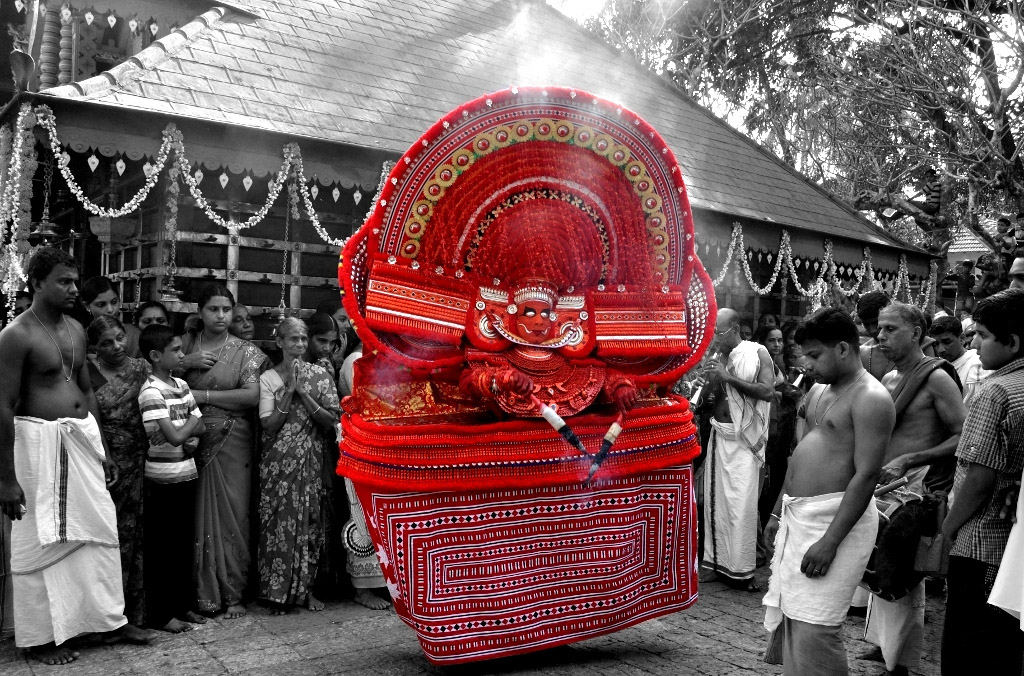
Kaliyattam at Valapattanam

Valapattanam Panchayath is rated among the best panchayaths in Kerala. The development activities of the panchayat has been commended by both the district and state authorities, as well as the public at large.

== See also ==
- Muthappan temple
- Sree Muthappan
- Kannur
