= Nileshwar Muthappan Madappura =

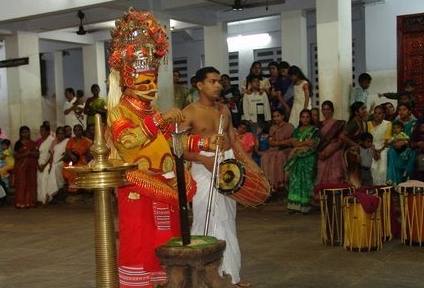
- Muthappan Theyyam as Vishnu

Religion
- Affiliation: Hinduism

Location
- Interactive map of Nileshwar Muthappan Madappura
- Coordinates: 12.25063°N 75.13005°E

Nileshwar Muthappan Madappura is a temple of the Hindu god Muthappan in the town of Nileshwar of Kasaragode district, Kerala state, South India.

== See also ==
- Parassinikkadavu
- Muthappan temple
- Kunnathoor Padi
- Rajarajeshwara Temple
- Sree Muthappan Temple Nileshwar
- Altharakkal Sree Muthappan Madapura
- Temples of Kerala
