= Trichambaram Temple =

Hindu temple in Kerala, India

Trichambaram Shree Krishna Temple
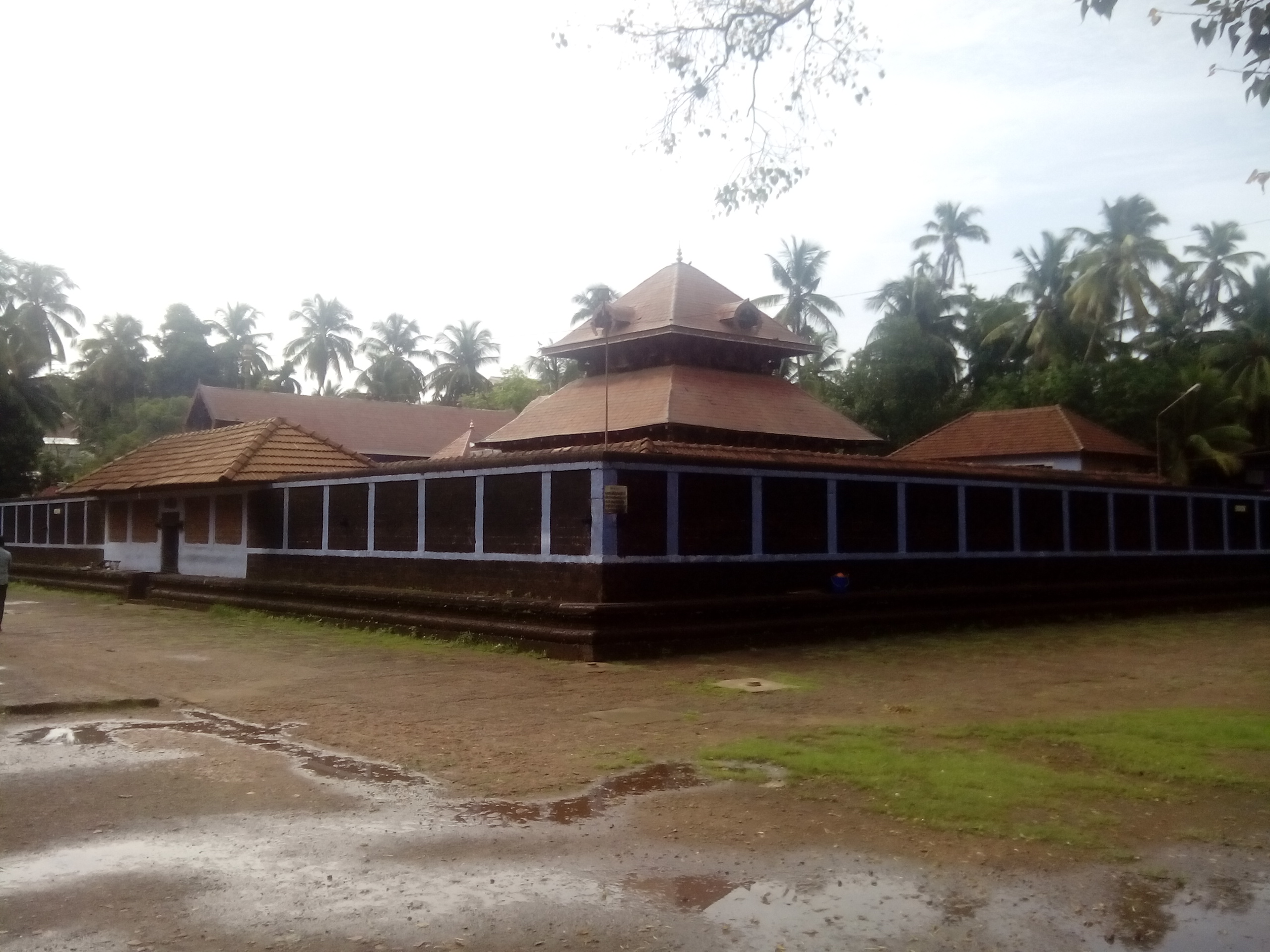
- Trichambaram Shree Krishna Temple, Taliparamba

- Location within Kerala

Religion
- Affiliation: Hinduism
- District: Kannur district
- Deity: Krishna
- Governing body: TTK Devaswam, Malabar Devaswom Board

Location
- Location: Taliparamba
- State: Kerala
- Country: India
- Coordinates: 12.0313°N 75.3680°E

Architecture
- Type: Kerala Architecture

Website
- Trichambaram_Shree_Krishna_Seva_Samithi

Trichambaram Temple is a Krishna temple located in Taliparamba, in the Kannur district of Kerala, South India. The main deity of the temple is Krishna after "Kamsavadham" sitting in His "Raudra" posture (ferocious posture). The Temple is among the Abhimana Kshethrams, which is a list of holy Vaishnavite shrines.

The temple is also mentioned in the 11th century CE Sanskrit kāvya "Mūṣikavaṃśa".

The sanctum has carvings and murals from the 15th and 16th centuries. In the temple complex there is also a shrine dedicated to Durga, which is in middle of a tank. This shrine is one of the 108 Durgalayas of Ancient Kerala. There are shrines for Shiva, Ganapathi, Sastha, Vishvaksena and Snake deities near the temple complex. There are three ponds near this temple.

== Administration ==
The temple is managed by TTK Devaswom (Taliparamba, Thrichambaram, Kanjirangad Devasom) which is a major devaswom board administering around 15 temples in the Kannur District of Kerala.

== Festival and Thitambu Nriththam ==
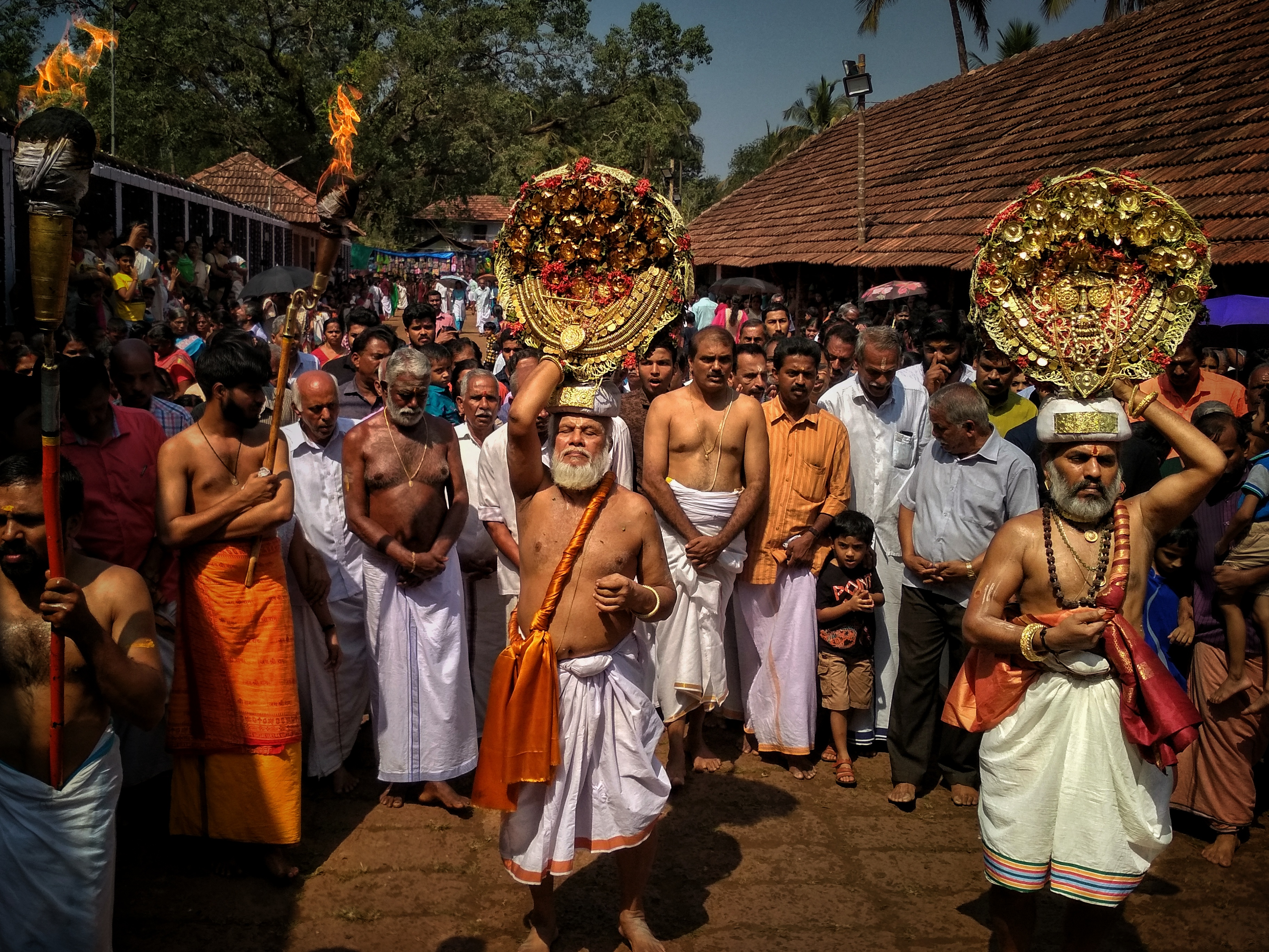
Krishna and Balaram - Trichambaram

The annual temple festival (Utsavam) is an event lasting two weeks, beginning on Kumbham 22 of the Malayalam calendar (which generally falls on 6 March) with the Kodiyettam (hoisting of a religious flag). It ends on Meenam 6 (which generally falls on 20 March) with the Koodipiriyal ceremony. In between these dates, for 11 days, Thitambu Nriththam (a form of dance with the idols of Krishna and Balarama) is held at Pookoth Nada (1 km from Trichambaram temple).

== See also ==
- Taliparamba
- Parassinikkadavu
- Parassinikkadavu Temple
- Muthappan temple
- Kunnathoor Padi
- Rajarajeshwara Temple
- Temples of Kerala
- Trichambaram inscription
- Trichambaram uthsavam
