= Malabar Devaswom Board =

Administrative body for Malabar's temples

- Formation: 1956; 70 years ago
- Type: Trust
- Purpose: Management of 1300 temples
- Headquarters: Kozhikode
- Location: Malabar Devaswom Board, Housefed Complex, Eranhippalam PO., Kozhikode - 673006.
- Region served: Kerala
- Chairman: Sri.M.R.Murali
- Website: www.malabardevaswom.kerala.gov.in

Malabar Devaswom Board is a statutory and Independent body created for the governing and management of nearly 1401 temples in South Malabar and North Malabar assigned to it. The board came into existence in its present form on 2 October 2008 following the Madras H.R & C.E (Amendment) Act, 2008 by Kerala Legislative Assembly.

== History ==
Till Pre-British era temple management was with local members of town. Temple was a place of many cultural activities and social development place with rest houses, cow dwelling places, community halls etc. In Northern Kerala most temples were controlled by aristocratic families with feudal background.

With the passing of Madras Regulation Act in the year 1817, temples were brought under the control of East India Company, a corporate organisation. However, from 1925, temples were brought under government control with the passing of State Religious and Charitable Endowments Act. Under this Act, the state governments exercised power for the formation of Temple Development Boards for major temples with the members from local city. The concept of temple included its premises and wealth and Temple Development Boards for many temples in India are created for the maintenance and governing of the affairs of temple. Thus the temples under Malabar District came under Madras H.R & C.E Act 1926.

After States Reorganisation Act, 1956, the temples in erstwhile Malabar District excluding Lakshadweep and including Kasaragod taluk of South Canara governed by Madras H.R & C.E Act 1926 came under the control of Government of Kerala. The Malabar Devaswom Board came into being in 2008, firstly through an ordinance and subsequently through the amendment of the act.

== Organisation ==
Temple Development Board includes Chairman, and seven other members appointed by State Government. Malabar Devaswom Board is presently headed by M.R. Murali, a Communist Party of India (Marxist) politician from Shoranur.

The temples are managed by a Devaswom Commissioner from Kozhikode. Under the commissioner there are five geographical divisions each headed by an Assistant Devaswom Commissioner namely;

- Kasaragod - 215 temples spread across Kasaragod district and Taliparamba taluk of Kannur district.
- Thalassery - 231 temples spread across Vatakara taluk of Kozhikode, Mananthavady taluk of Wayanad and Kannur district
- Kozhikode - temples spread across rest of Kozhikode and Wayanad districts and Eranad taluk of Malappuram.
- Malappuram - nearly 350 temples spread across Malappuram district, Ottapalam taluk, Chavakkad and Kodungallur taluks of Thrissur district.
- Palakkad - 346 temples in Palakkad district and one in Fort Kochi

There are nearly 1401 temples and over 6,000 employees under Malabar Devaswom Board. The temples under board are categorised based on revenue.

- Super Grade - above 4 crore revenue - 10 temples and 500 staff.
- First Grade - between 75 lakhs and 4 crore revenue - 25 temples and around 1000 staff.
- Second Grade - between 25 lakhs and 75 lakhs - 40 temples and around 250 staff.
- Third Grade - 10 - 25 lakhs revenue.
- Fourth Grade - less than 10 lakhs revenue.

== Roles and Responsibilities ==
Roles and Responsibilities of Temple Development Board includes the following:

- Ensuring performance of rituals.
- Ensuring accounting of collections.
- Development and maintenance of temples in other towns.
- Ensuring security of the temple property.
- Ensuring welfare of pilgrims.
- Look after welfare of staff.
- Hygiene preparation of Prasad.
- Road Maintenance and drinking water supply in premises.

== List of famous temples maintained by the Board ==
Following is the list of famous temples maintained by the Board:

Sl No	Temple	Division	Taluk
1	Rajarajeshwara Temple	Kasaragod	Taliparamba
2	Sree Subrahmanya Swami Temple, Payyannur	Kasaragod	Taliparamba
3	Muthappan Temple, Parassinikkadavu	Kasaragod	Taliparamba
4	Srimath Anantheshwara Temple, Manjeshwar	Kasaragod	Manjeshwaram
5	Ananthapura Lake Temple	Kasaragod	Manjeshwaram
6	Madhur Temple	Kasaragod	Kasaragod
7	Trikkannad Tryambakeshwara Temple	Kasaragod	Kasaragod
8	Madayi Kavu	Thalassery	Kannur
9	Peralasseri Temple	Thalassery	Kannur
10	Kottiyoor Temple	Thalassery	Thalaserry
11	Lokanarkavu Temple	Thalassery	Vatakara
12	Thirunelli Temple	Thalassery	Mananthavady
13	Chinakkathoor Temple	Palakkad	Ottapalam
14	Valayanad Devi Temple	Kozhikode	Kozhikode
15	Mammiyoor Temple	Malappuram	Chavakkad
16	Thirumandhamkunnu Temple	Malappuram	Perinthalmanna
17	Kadampuzha Devi Temple	Malappuram	Tirur
18	Thirunavaya Navamukunda Temple	Malappuram	Tirur
19	Thrikkandiyur Shiva Temple	Malappuram	Tirur
20	Vairankode Bhagavathy Temple	Malappuram	Tirur
21	Alattiyur Hanuman Temple	Malappuram	Tirur
22	Triprangode Shiva Temple	Malappuram	Tirur

Sree Parthasarathisaradi Temple Guruvayoor

== See also ==
- Hindu Religious and Charitable Endowments Department
- Devaswom boards in Kerala
- Travancore Devaswom Board
