= Vismaya =

Water park in Kannur, Kerala, India

Vismaya Water Theme Park

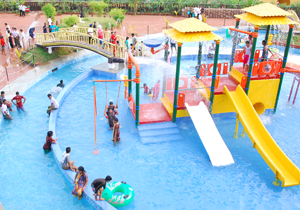
- Wavepool, one of the water rides in Vismaya
- Location: Parassinikadavu, Kannur, Kerala, India
- Status: Operating
- Opened: 2008
- Owner: Malabar Tourism Development Corporation
- Slogan: "ഉല്ലാസം എല്ലാര്‍ക്കും" (Fun for everyone)
- Website: www.vismayakerala.com

Vismaya is an amusement water theme park near Taliparamba in Kannur district, Kerala. The park is developed and run by Malabar Tourism Development Co-operative Limited (MTDC). It is situated near to the famous Muthappan temple in Parassinikadavu. It was officially inaugurated in August 2008 and since then it has become one of the favorite holiday destination in Malabar. The park is completely operated by the rain water collected by the reservoir spread over two acres (0.81 ha) of land with a capacity of 50,000,000 L (11,000,000 imp gal; 13,000,000 US gal) of water.

== Developments and the future ==
Malabar Tourism Development Cooperative Limited (MTDC) was registered on 15 February 2000. And one month later on 9 March 2000 kick-started its operations with E.P. Jayarajan as the chairman. The job sector of Malabar, mainly Kannur focused on textile industry especially handloom, khadi and other industries such as beedi, pottery etc. an integral part of conventional occupation of the region. But all these occupations faced many challenges which gradually lead to an economic decline. In such scenario, to meet the growing market and to create more job opportunities in addition to catering to the growing tourism industry, MTDC came into existence.

The main objects of MTDC are to promote, establish, maintain and manage the business related to tourism and hospitality industry by setting up establishment such as:

- Amusement park, museum.
- Tour operations for foreign and domestic tourists.
- Hotels, restaurants, cool bars, ice cream stall, motels etc.
- Shops for selling handicrafts, curious etc.
- Water sports and river cruises.
- Hill and beach resorts with all modern facilities to attract foreign and domestic tourists, etc.

Vismaya park is one of the first projects started by MTDC.

In 2025, the park added a new Italian adventure thrill ride called Wrodix (Rodix), imported from Italy, as part of its expansion of dry rides for the holiday season.

== Features ==
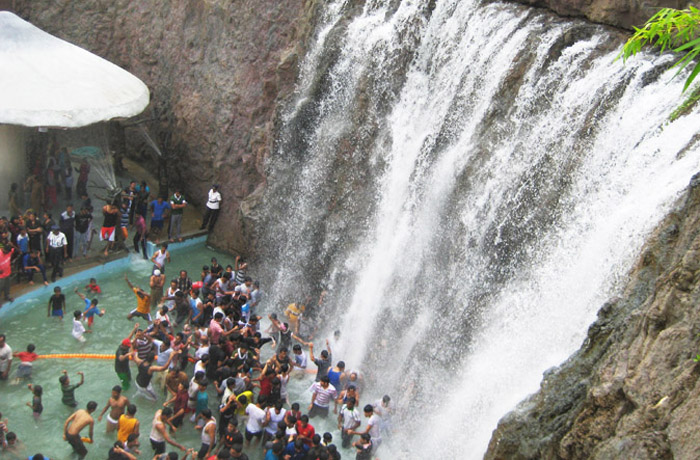
Virtual Waterfall is one of the major attractions of Vismaya

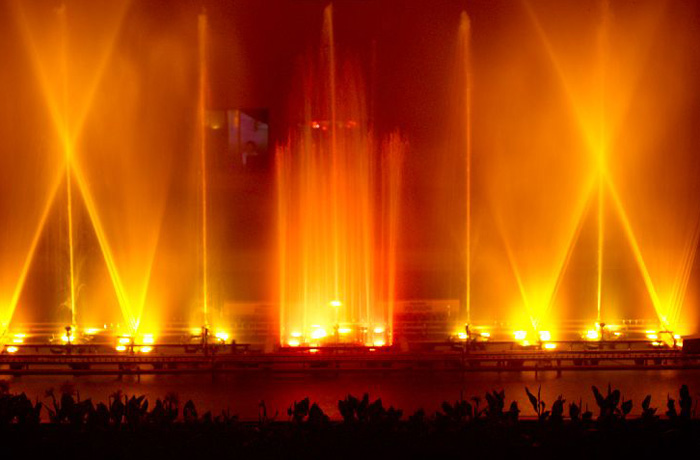
Laser show

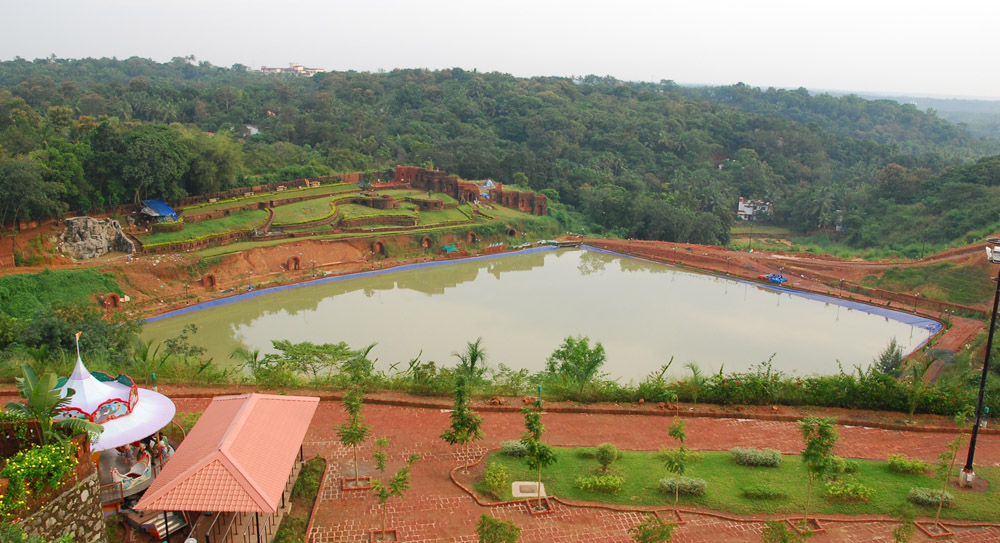
Rainwater reservoir at Vismaya park

Vismaya is a blend of amusement, water theme and infotainment park. It has got water rides, informative and entertaining activities for kids and adventurous rides for adults. 56+ rides for just 990 INR is the major attraction why vismaya park is considered as the no.1 amusment park in North Kerala

=== Main attractions ===
Virtual waterfall and Laser show are the two main attractions of this amusement park. Virtual waterfall is a musical waterfall where the visitors dance under the water stream to the background music. This crowd puller is open everyday starting 2 pm and usually ends by 3 pm. Laser shows are usually staged in the evening, and are a major attraction.

=== Rides ===
Major rides are:

- Aqua Trail
- Electric swing
- Giant wheel
- Jumping frog
- Merry go round
- Sky Train
- Striking car
- Tide pool
- Tornado
- Twister

=== Rain water harvesting ===
The rain water harvesting plan undertook by Vismaya is spread over two acres of reservoir and all the water requirements of the park is met with this collected water. This green policy undertaken by Vismaya makes it one of the environmental friendly water theme parks in the world.

== Nearby attractions ==
- Aralam Wildlife Sanctuary
- Bekal Fort
- Dharmadam island
- Ezhimala
- Meenkunnu Beach
- Muthappan temple
- Muzhappilangad beach
- Paithalmala
- Parassinikkadavu Snake Park
- Payyambalam Beach

== Other attractions ==
- Theyyam
- Kolkali
- Poorakkali
- Thidambu Nritham

== Cuisine ==
- Kalathappam
- Kinnathappam
- Pathiri

== See also ==
- North Malabar
- Kerala Tourism

== Image gallery ==
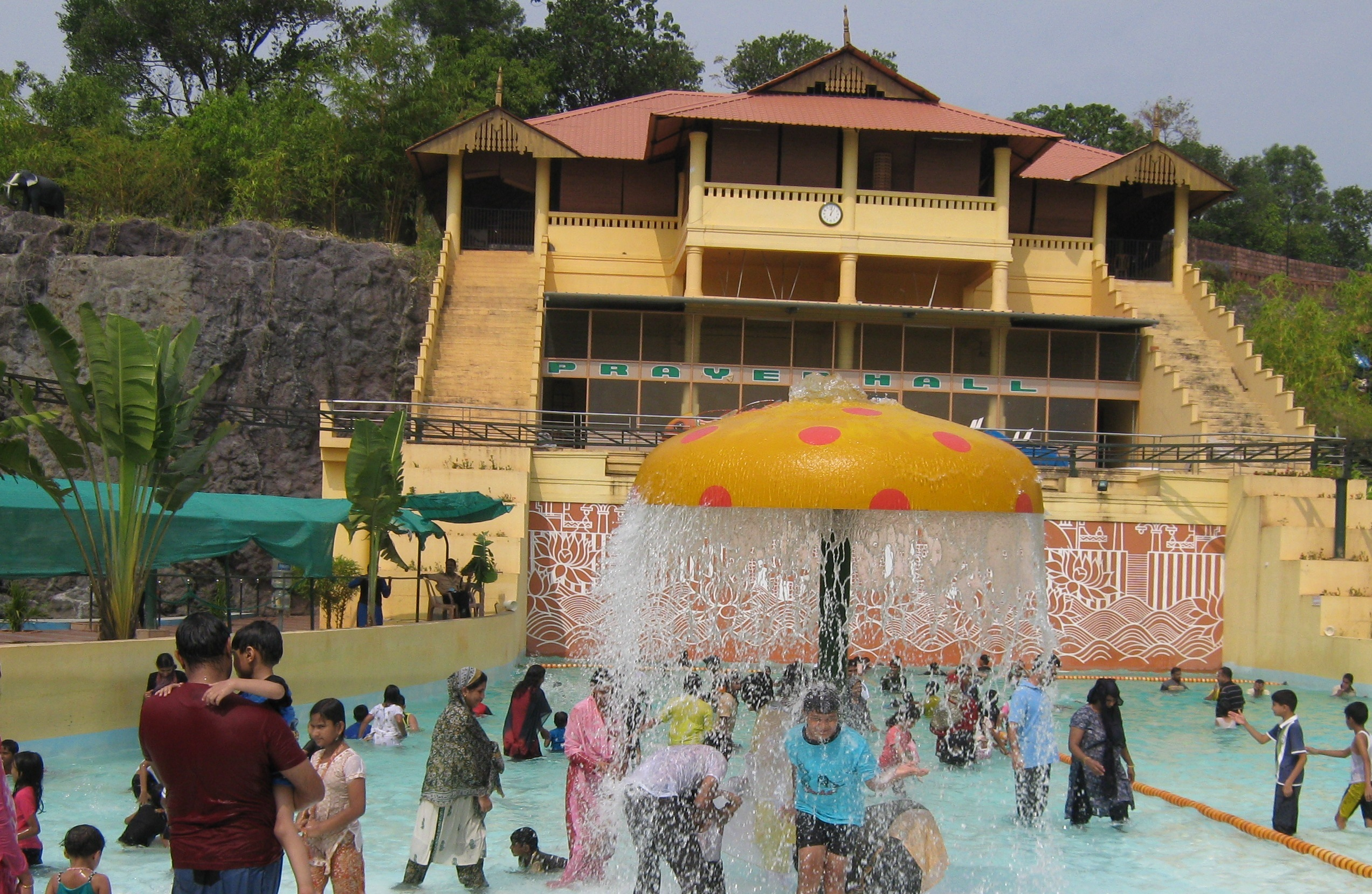
Vismaya Park

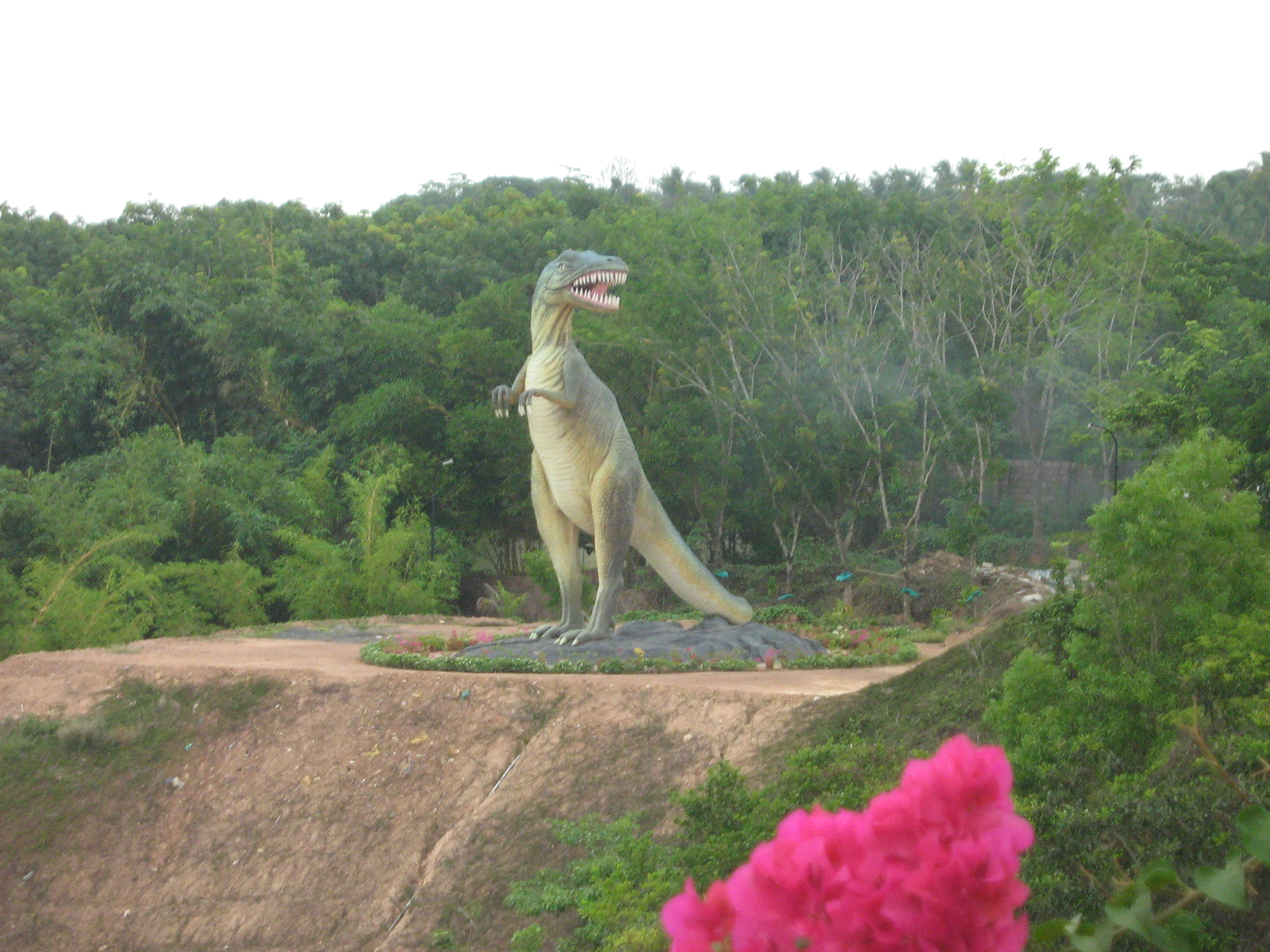
The main attraction

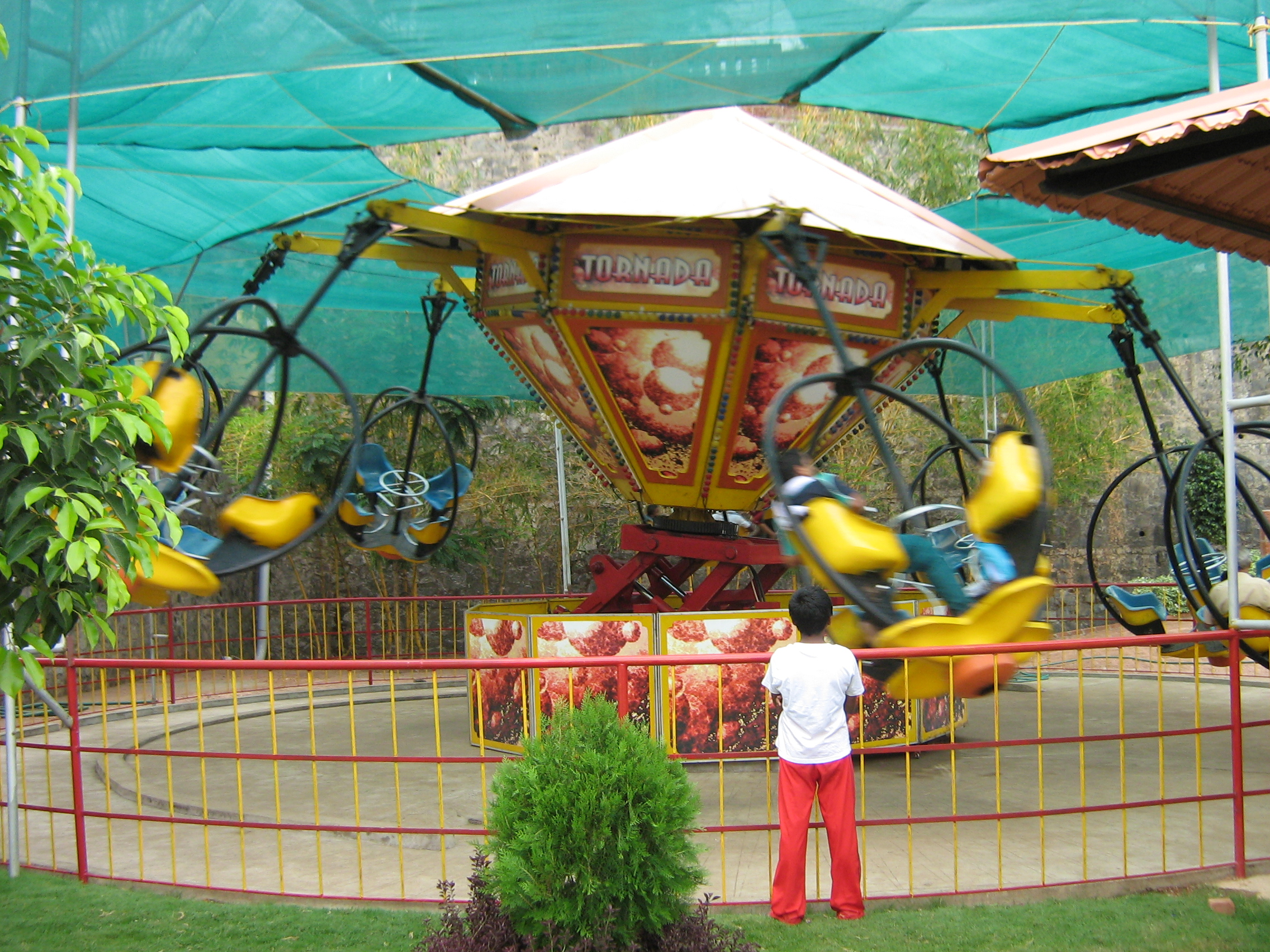
The Cradle

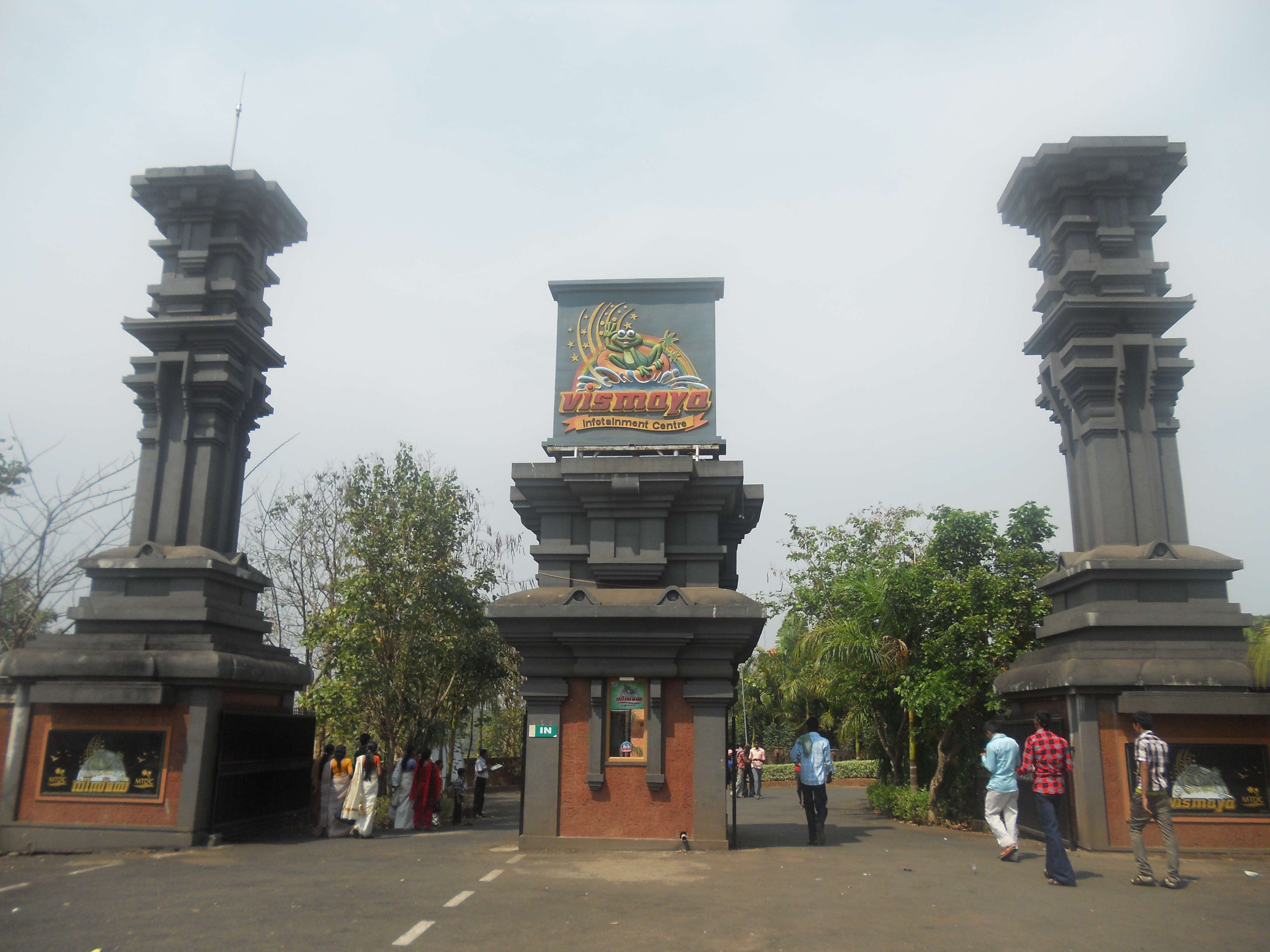
The entrance

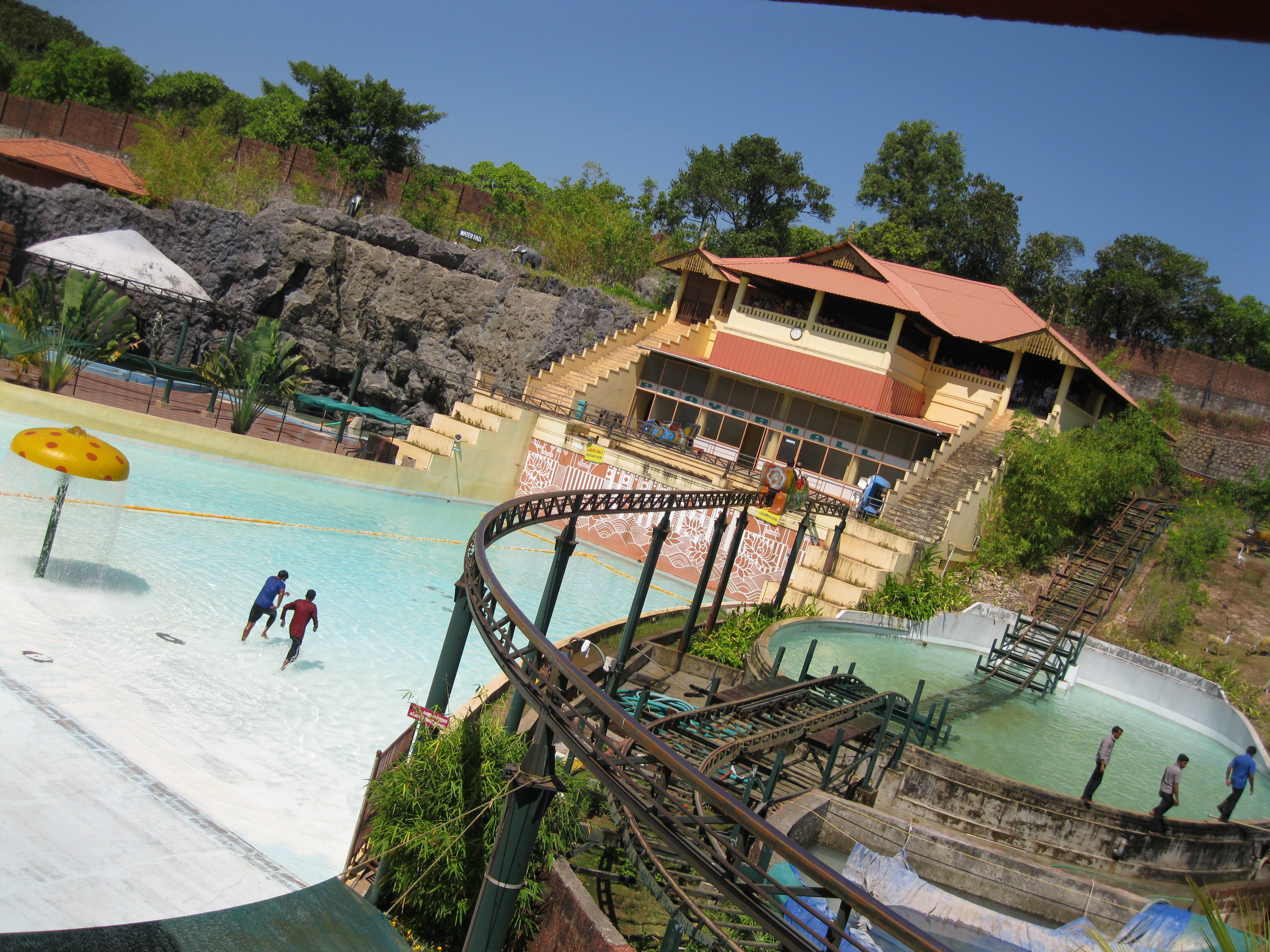
Inside the park

== Sources ==
- Keralatourism.org
- Asianetindia.com
- Livekerala.blogspot.com
- My-kerala.com
- Zonkerala.com
