= Sree Maheswara Temple =

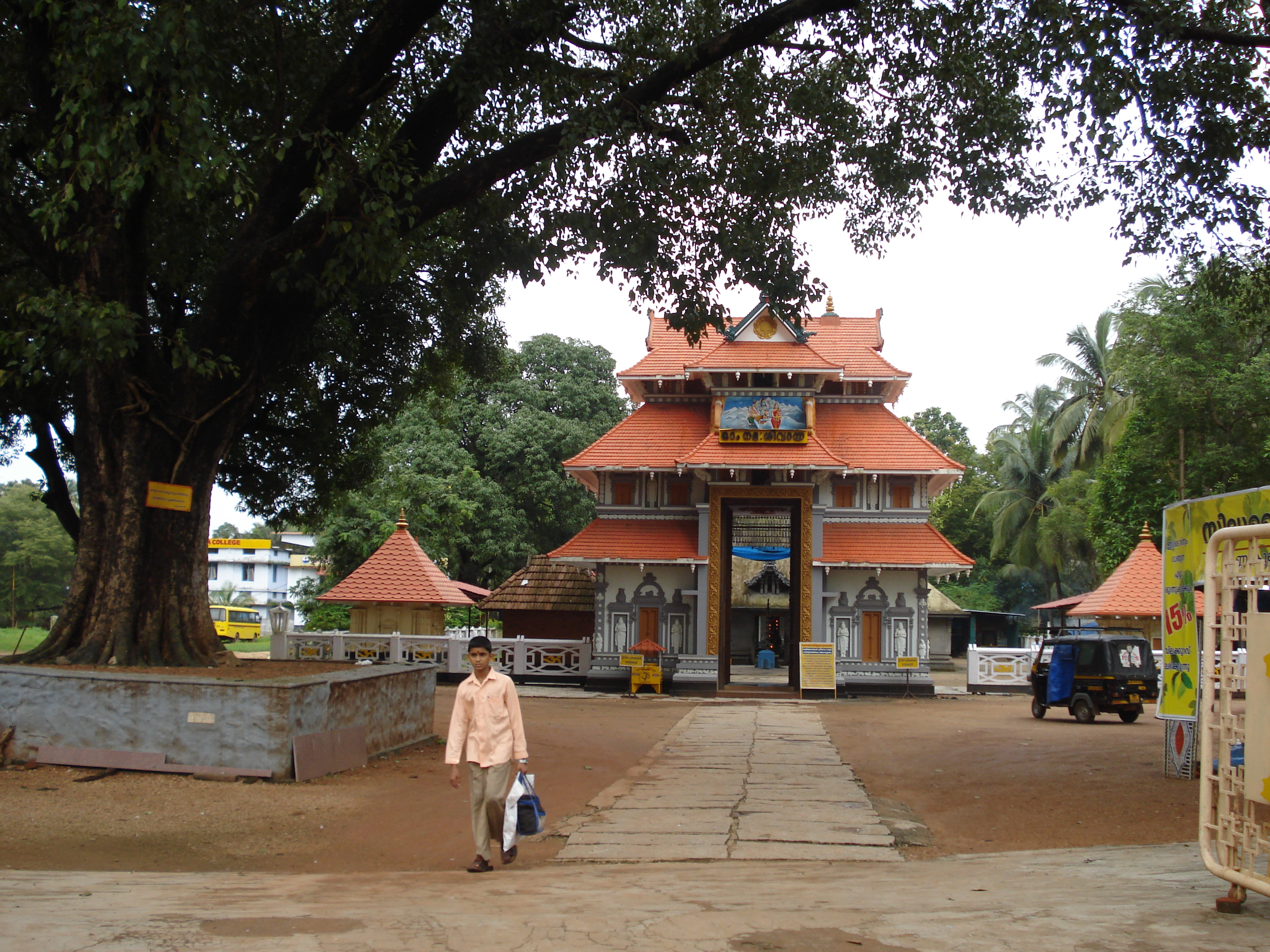

- Sree Maheswara Temple, Koorkenchery, Thrissur, Kerala

Religion
- Affiliation: Hinduism
- District: Thrissur
- Deity: Shiva
- Festival: Thaipooya Mahotsavam

Location
- Location: Koorkenchery, City of Thrissur
- State: Kerala
- Country: India
- Interactive map of Sree Maheswara Temple
- Coordinates: 10.5026°N 76.2125°E

Architecture
- Type: Architecture of Kerala
- Elevation: 39.51 m (130 ft)

Sree Maheswara Temple is a Hindu temple situated at Koorkenchery in Thrissur city of Kerala state. The main idol in this temple is Shiva and was consecrated by Narayana Guru in M. E. 1092. There are sub-shrines for Parvathi, Ganapathi, Murugan, Ayyappan, Krishna, Muthappan, Bhadrakali, Navagrahas and Nāgas (serpent deities). Even though Shiva is the main deity of the temple, Thaipooya Mahotsavam, a seven-day festival dedicated to Subramanya, is the main festival held here. It is one among the biggest festivals in the vicinity of Thrissur, perhaps second only to Thrissur Pooram.
