= Kapalikulangara Sree Mahavishnu Temple =

- Location within Kerala

Religion
- Affiliation: Hinduism
- District: Kannur district
- Deity: Mahavishnu

Location
- Location: Taliparamba
- State: Kerala
- Country: India
- Coordinates: 12°3′8.6934″N 75°21′23.3136″E

Architecture
- Type: Traditional Kerala style
- Completed: Modern temple

The Kapalikulangara Sree Mahavishnu Temple is located in Taliparamba, Kannur district, Kerala, India, near the Sree Rajarajeshwara temple.

== See also ==
- Rajarajeshwara temple
- Trichambaram Temple
