= Vismayam =

Vismayam may refer to these Indian films:

- Vismayam (1998 film), a 1998 Malayalam film directed by Raghunath Paleri
- Vismayam (2016 film) or Manamantha, a 2016 Malayalam film directed by Chandra Sekhar Yeleti

== See also ==
- Vismaya, water park in Kannur, Kerala, India
- Vismaya (film), a 2017 Indian film
- V. K. Vismaya, Indian sprinter
- Vismayathumbathu, a 2004 Indian Malayalam-language film
