= Muthappan =

Deity

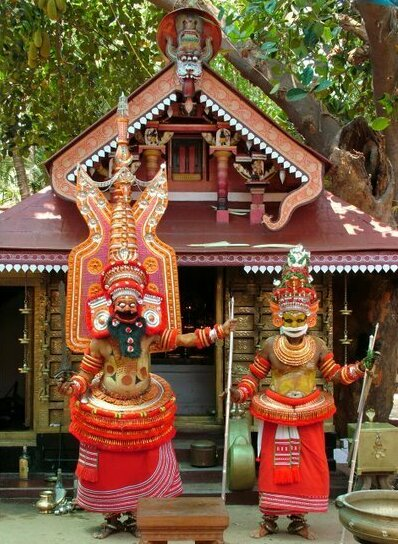
- Thiruvappan or Valiya Muthapan Shiva during the creation of Kaalabhairavan on left and the Vellatom or Cheriya Muthapan Kalabhairavam on right
- Weapon: Spear‚ Sword‚ Bow & Arrow
- Mount: Wild Hound (Hunting Dogs)

Muthappan is a deity commonly worshipped in the northern region of Kerala in India. Muthappan is considered a personification of two gods: Thiruvappan or Valiya Muthapan, and the Vellatom or Cheriya Muthapan worshipped in an ancestral form. All the puja rituals and rites performed for Muthappan are performed by the Thiyyar community of Malabar, as it is regarded as the Kulapoorvikan (group ancestor) of the Thiyyar community in Malabar.

Practices in Muthappan temples are distinct from those in other Hindu temples of Kerala. The rituals are related to Shakteyam where Panja-ma-kara are offered, sometimes including madyam (in this case, Toddy) and mamsam (generally flesh, in this case fish). Muthappan is worshipped in the form of Theyyam and is not represented through a traditional prathishta (consecrated idol). As such, Madappuras, the shrines dedicated to Muthappan, do not contain idol forms or structures such as the kodimaram (temple flagstaff), which are commonly found in conventional Hindu temples.

While most temples in Kerala traditionally restrict entry to non-Hindus, Muthappan temples are more inclusive, allowing entry regardless of caste or religion. In the Malabar region, festivals held at Muthappan Madappuras often see enthusiastic participation from Muslims, reflecting broad involvement across the local community.

== Myths and legends ==
=== Muthappan stories ===
==== Parassinikkadavu Muthappan ====
The belief in Muthappan likely originated in Eruvessy, a village located in the hilly eastern region of Kannur district, in northern Kerala. Eruvessy lies in the remote valley hills of the Kodagu (Coorg) mountains in the Western Ghats. A significant site associated with its origin is the Paddikutty Devi Temple, where the goddess is believed to be the foster mother of Muthappan. This temple is situated near the palaces of Mutedath Aramana and Elayidath Aramana, which belonged to the anjaramanakkal (of 5 aramanas or royal house) Mannanar dynasty of Eruvessy, believed to be the last Thiyya dynasty in Kerala. Ruins of this palace are still visible today along the banks of the Eruvessy River.

Legend says that Muthappan decided to look for a more favorable residence so that he could achieve his objective of his Avataram. He reached Parassini, where the Parassini Temple stands today. Since then, Muthappan has been believed to reside at Parassinikkadavu.

== See also ==
- Parassinikkadavu
- Muthappan temple
- Kunnathoor Padi
- Rajarajeshwara Temple
- Sree Muthappan Temple Nileshwar
- Altharakkal Sree Muthappan Madapura
