= Trichambaram inscription =

11th century inscription in Kerala

Trichambaram Inscription
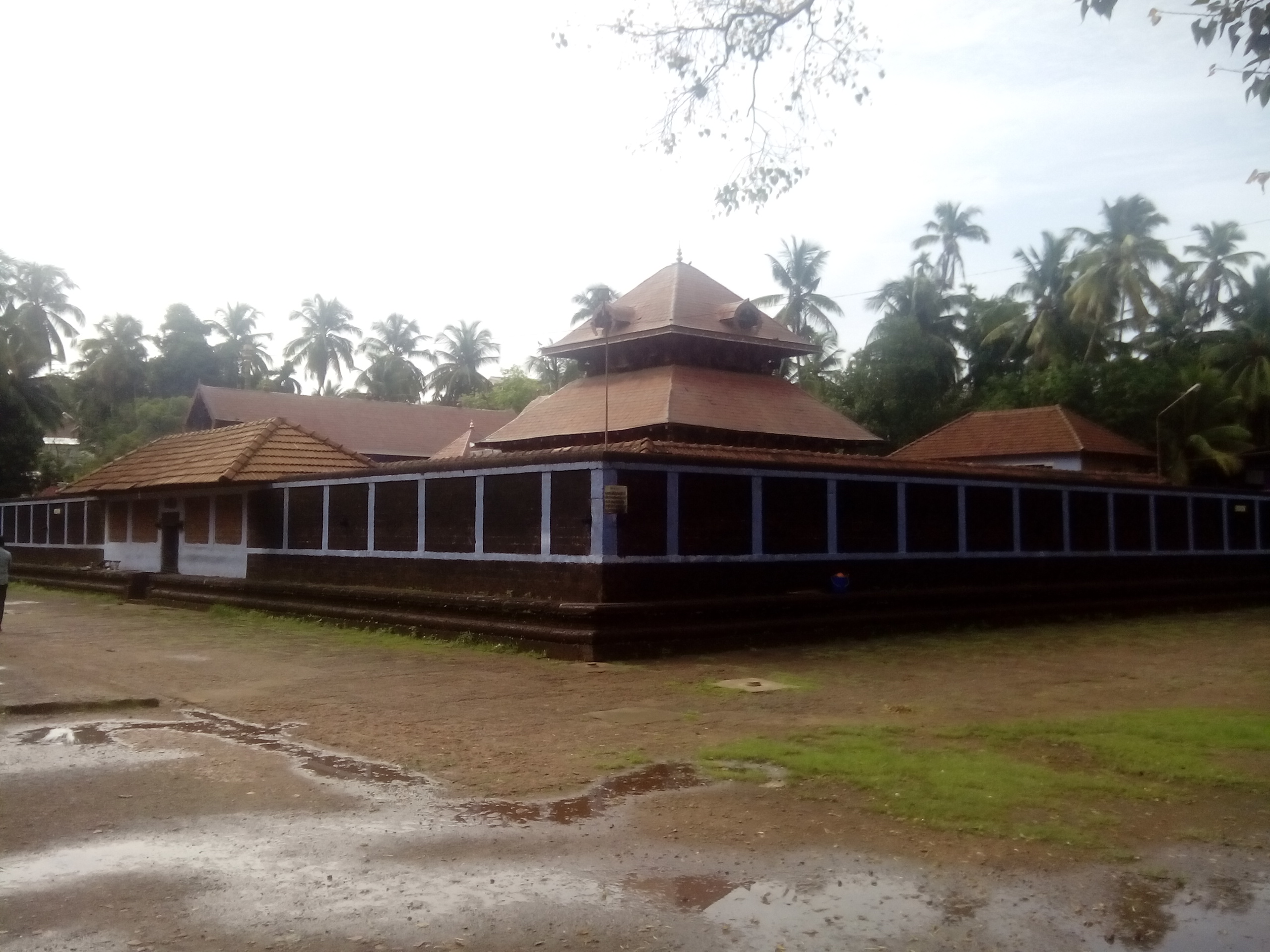
- Trichambaram Temple
- Material: Granite
- Writing: Early Malayalam
- Created: c. 11th century AD; Kerala
- Present location: Trichambaram Temple

The Trichambaram inscription (c. 11th century AD) is a medieval record from Trichambaram, near Taliparamba in north Kerala. The old Malayalam inscription, in Vattezhuthu script with additional Grantha characters, is engraved on two blocks of granite at the base of the central shrine of the Trichambaram Temple (12 lines, inscribed on one side).

- The inscription records an endowment made by "Manavepala Manaviyadan", the chieftain of Eranadu, for the thiruvilakku at "Trichemmaram Temple".
- It also mentions an individual named Kapali Narayanan Bhattavijayan, a plot of land, and the arrangements for the weekly supply of oil for the thiruvilakku.
- "Manavepala Manaviyadan" was the hereditary title of the chieftains of Eranadu in central Kerala.

== See also ==
- Jewish copper plates of Cochin
