= Alattiyur Hanuman Temple =

Hindu temple in Kerala, India

Alathiyur Hanuman Temple
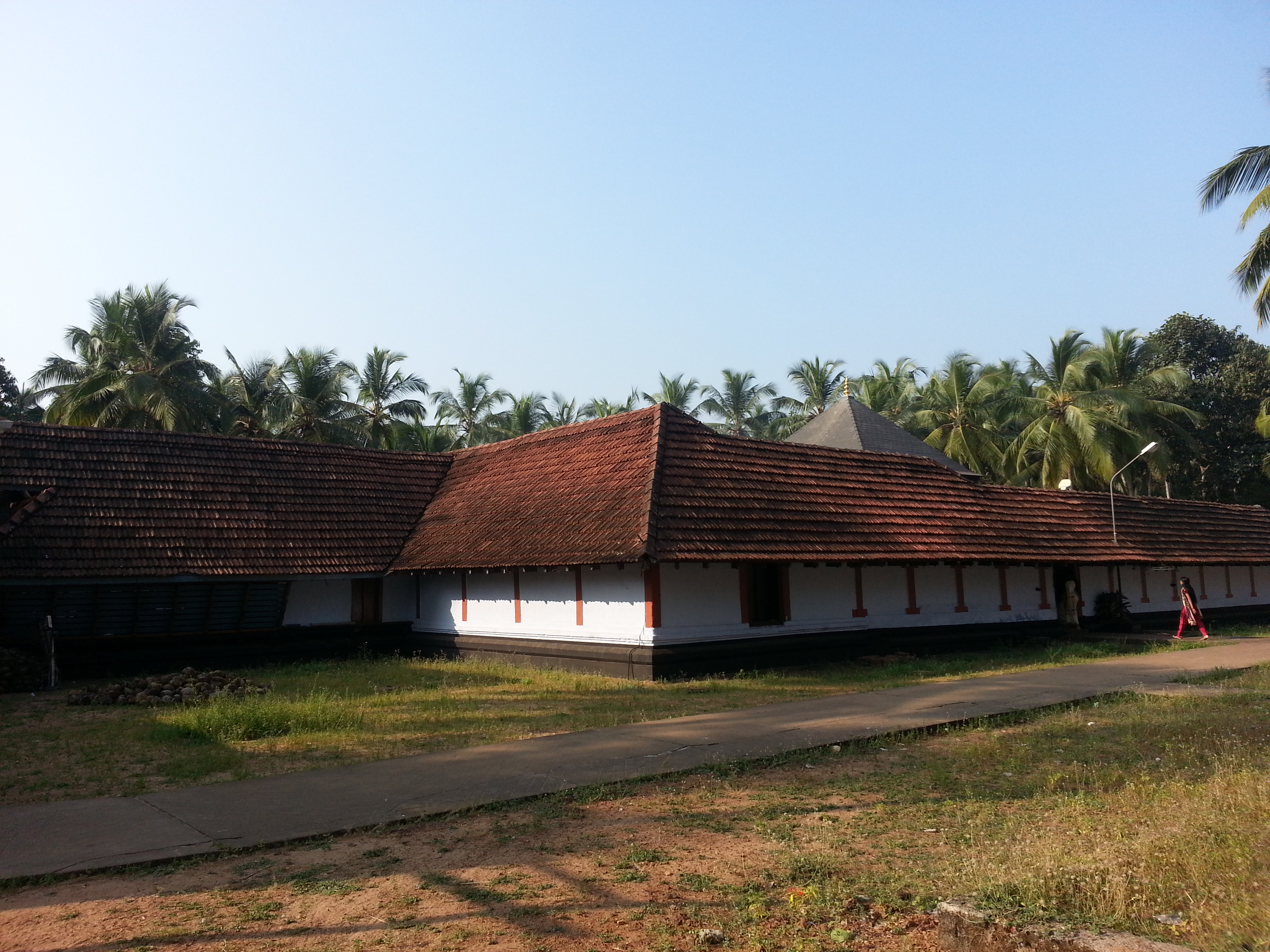

- Hanuman Temple, Alathiyoor, Malappuram, Kerala

Religion
- Affiliation: Hinduism
- District: Malappuram
- Deity: Rama

Location
- Location: Alathiyur, Tirur
- State: Kerala
- Country: India
- Coordinates: 10.872040°N 75.939264°E

Architecture
- Elevation: 31.7 m (104 ft)

Website
- http://www.alathiyoorhanumankavu.org/

Alathiyur Hanuman Temple, also known as Alathiyur Perumthrikkovil or Hanuman Kavu, is a famous Hindu temple between the Ponnani River and the Bharathappuzha at Alathiyur near Tirur, Malappuram district, Kerala state, India. Although the main deity is Rama, the seventh avatar of Vishnu, Hanuman, believed to be an incarnation of Shiva and a devotee of Rama and a Chiranjivi, is as famous as the main deity in the temple. Also reside in the temple as sub-deities of equal importance: Lakshmana, Ganesha, Maha Vishnu, Durga, Bhadrakali, Ayyappan, and Naga deities. According to legend, the idol of Hanuman was consecrated 3000 years ago (1000 AD) by Sage Vasishtha, one of the Saptarishis. Over the years, the custodians of the temple were the Alathiyur village Nambudiri Clan, the King of Vettathunad, and the Samuthiri of Kozhikode. Aval is the main offering in this temple. The main annual event here is the festival held on the days corresponding with the Stars of Pooradam, Uthradam and Thiruvonam in the month of Thulam corresponding to mid-October to mid-November. The month of Karkidakam, corresponding to mid-July and mid-August, popularly called the Ramayana month, is usually crowded. The weekdays of Tuesday, Thursday and Saturday are also important as they are considered auspicious for Hanuman. The temple is administered by a Trust under the Malabar Devaswom Board, with the Samuthiri royalty as the Chief Trustee. This is believed to be the most important temple among the temples under the administration of the Malabar Devaswom Board.

== The Legend ==
Although the main deity of this temple is Rama, this temple is popularly known as the Hanuman temple. It is believed that Rama gave instructions and advice to Hanuman here before Hanuman went to Lanka in search of Sita. The idol of Hanuman is placed next to that of Rama. Hanuman is leaning forward as if to listen to Lord Rama's words, holding a stick in his hand. The temple of Lakshmana is a few meters away. It is believed that Lakshmana stood aside so that Hanuman and Rama could talk privately. Here, a structure has been built to commemorate Hanuman's leap across the ocean to Lanka. At one end of this structure is a large black stone symbolizing the sea. Devotees run along this ridge and jump over the black stone. Jumping in this temple is believed to bring good luck, health, longevity and wealth. It is believed that Hanuman at Alathiyur not only removes all the sorrows and fears of the devotees but also fulfils their wishes.

== Temple Architecture ==
=== Temple Premises and Walls ===
The temple is located near Alathiyur village, facing the East. A number of shops can be found right in front of the temple. The entrance to the temple is very narrow, posing difficulties for large vehicles to enter and exit. A parking facility is allotted on the northeastern side. To the north of the Gopuram is the Temple tank. This wide and beautiful tank is where the priest and the devotees take baths before entering the temple. A small Peepal tree can be seen before the tank. According to Hinduism, Brahma resides at the top of the sacred tree, Vishnu in the middle and Shiva at the bottom. It is believed that circumbulating the tree seven times a day in the morning gives health and wellness. A Cluster fig tree can also be found in the vicinity. It is believed that the place got its name as Alathiyur (a combination of the vernacular names of these trees, namely, 'Aal'(ആൽ) and 'Athi' (അത്തി) respectively, and the term 'Oor' (ഊർ) meaning a village). They are two of the famous four trees (Nalpamaram or നാല്പാമരം) extensively used in Ayurvedic preparations. A two-story ramshackle tower built on the Eastern side looks decayed due to age. Atop the Gopuram is a plaque with the figures of Rama, Hanuman and Lakshmana.

If one enters through the Eastern corridor, the first thing one will encounter is an Elephant enclosure. This relatively large Elephant enclosure was built not long ago. There is no Temple flagstaff, as there is no flag-hoisting festival in the temple. There are plans to install it. A large Altar has been built in front of the Rama deity. The central Altar of the temple is here. Although the Altar is quite high, it is built slightly lower so the deity can be seen from the outside. An image of Hanuman is also hung above it. A small door can be seen on the Southern side of the Altar. This door faces Hanuman's feet. It is built for those who cannot enter the temple. The Offerings/Donation collection office is located on the Southeastern side. The main offerings to the deities are Palpayasam to Rama and Aval to Hanuman. Offerings of Nivedyams to these deities are considered very special. Many devotees offer these Nivedyams to achieve their desired goals. They are provided in quantities such as 1 Nazhi, 50 Nazhi, or 100 Nazhi (Nazhi, which is approximately 312 millilitres, is a measurement unit used in ancient Kerala to measure volume). There were reports that the former Chief Minister of Tamil Nadu, J. Jayalalitha, was a devotee of this temple who made offerings seeking positive outcomes in litigations involving her. A small shrine of Vishnu can be found right next to the Offerings Counter. It is believed that Vishnu, who used to be the main deity of the Irani temple in the nearby Kalpakancheri village, was brought here and installed here due to some local issues. Though it is an idol of Vishnu, the deity is seen as Sri Krishna facing the West.

While circumambulating Vishnu, one can see a small sand mound in the southwest and a granite pedestal to jump upon. It depicts Hanuman's journey to Lanka. Running towards it and jumping on the stone platform without stepping on is considered good for overcoming obstacles in life. Therefore, many devotees perform this, which attracts the devotees who come to the temple. There are no noteworthy sights on the Western side. The temple of Lakshmana is on the Northern side. Here, Lakshmana is not just a deity but a deity of equal importance. Lakshmana resides outside the Nalambalam on the premise of avoiding hearing the private conversation between Rama and Hanuman. The deity of Lakshmana, the incarnation of Adisesha, is four-armed, facing the East, and housed in a small square covered with copper. A small prayer hall is also found in the front. There is a Ganesha shrine on the Southern side of Lakshmana's shrine. At the back, one can also see the Naga shrines. An offering counter has also been built specifically for Lakshmana. Palpayasam itself is important here, too.

== The Sanctum Sanctorum ==
The temple's sanctum sanctorum (Srikovil in the vernacular) is in a large two-story square. Both the floors of the granite shrine are covered with Copper. A golden dome shines above. There are three rooms inside the shrine. Among them, the Garbhagriha where the deity is placed is at the Western end. Rama resides in a four-armed Vishnu idol, about five feet high, facing East. The idol is made of Black stone. However, it is covered with Panchaloha. Sudarshana Chakra Wheel is carried on the rear right hand, the Panchajanya on the rear left hand, the Kaumodaki on the front left hand and a Lotus flower on the front right hand. It is conceived as Rama, who is lonely during his quest for Sita. Hence, there is no shrine for Sita here. The shrine of Hanuman is in another temple built on its Southern side. Hanuman is about three feet tall and standing with both hands folded and facing the left. It is believed to be the form of listening to Rama's instructions.

The sanctum sanctorum is decorated with exquisite murals and sculptures. These are apparently not very old. Mainly, scenarios taken from Ramayana are used here, such as Rama's birth, Sita Svayamvara, Jatayu Moksha, Hanuman in Kadalivanam, etc., are important among them. But the most important of these is an image of Bhadrakali with eight arms. There is a story behind this picture, according to which, once upon a time, the Bhagavati temple at the great Kapalathinkal near here had the same Priest. When it was difficult to manage both places at the same time, he requested Bhagavati to be always present. That is how the presence of Bhadrakali came to be here.

== Abode of Hanuman ==
The temple of Sri Hanuman is adjacent to the main Temple of Sree Rama. Sree Hanuman has his head tilted to left (to Rama's Adobe), to hear his master's words. Sree Rama is confiding in Hanuman the cue-word ( Abhignana Vaakyam ) that would enable him to gain the confidence of Sita. Hanuman has a mace in his hand. The numerous Gods bestowed their enormous power on Sree Hanuman. He is all set to accomplish his mission, which is seeking the whereabouts of Sita. Here he is the personification of divine strength, confidence, concentration of purpose, Bhakti, and above all humility. He is the symbol of supreme self-sacrifice. He seems to be assuring Sree Rama: "Your wish is my command". Devotees of Hanuman throng to this temple to make their wishes and be heard by the mighty Hanuman.

As the situation in Ramayana, Lakshmana is away from Rama and Hanuman so that he can't be hearing the cue-word.

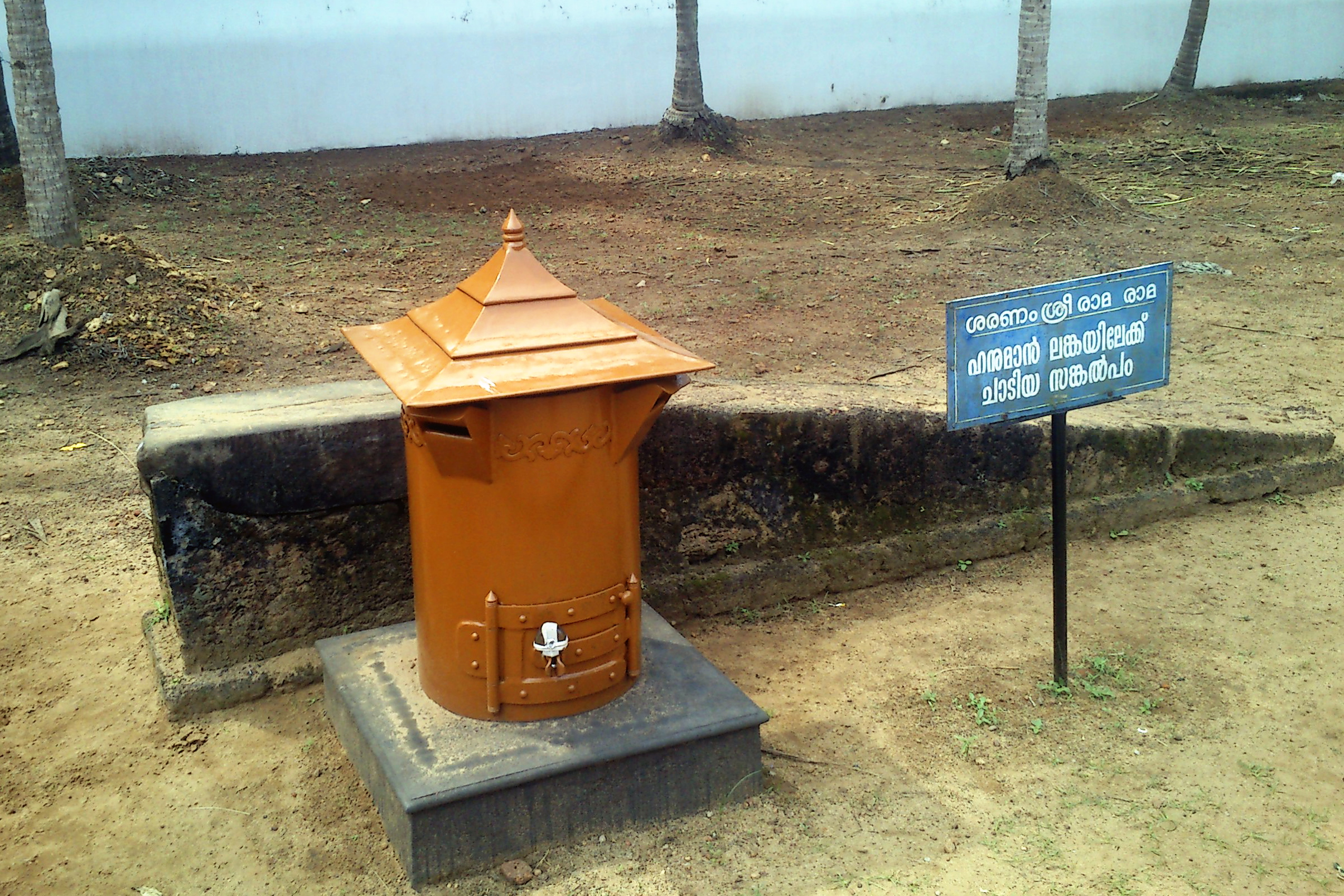
Alathiyoor Temple Stone

== Location and transport ==
The nearest railway station is about 7 km away from here. The nearest airport is at Kozhikode.

== See also ==
- Religions of Kerala
- Temples of Kerala
