= Pullur, Kasaragod =

Pullur
- Village
- Location in Kerala, India Pullur (India)
- Coordinates: 12°18′0″N 75°5.4′0″E
- Country: India
- State: Kerala
- District: Kasaragod

Government
  - Body: Pullur Periya Grama Panchayath
- Time zone: UTC+5:30 (IST)
- PIN: 671531
- Telephone code: 467
- Taluk: Hosdurg
- Lok Sabha constituency: Kasaragod

Pullur is a small town located in the Hosdurg taluk of Kasaragod district, Kerala.

It is situated 10 km from the sub-district headquarters, Kanhangad and 30 km from the district headquarters, Kasaragod. As of 2009, Pullurperiya is the Gram Panchayat of Pullur village.

The total geographical area of the village is 2859 hectares. Pullur has a total population of 15,565 peoples, with about 3,667 houses in Pullur village. As of 2019, Pullur villages falls under the Uduma assembly and Kasaragod parliamentary constituency. Kanhangad is the nearest town to Pullur, approximately 10 km away.

== Places of worship ==
- Kodavalam Sree Mahavishnu Temple
- Pullur Sree Mahavishnu Temple
- Vishnu mangalam Sree Mahavishnu Temple
- Altharakkal Sree Muthappan Madapura
- Thalikkundu Sri Vishnu Chamundeshwari Temple

== Institutions ==
- Govt UP School Pullur
- UNHS Pullur
- Govt ITI Pullur
- Laxmi Meghan College of Nursing

== Location ==
Pullur is located between Periya and Kanhangad on National Highway 66. The town has grown in prominence because of a large number of new organisations being established there.
