= Trichambaram uthsavam =

Annual Hindu festival in Kerala, India

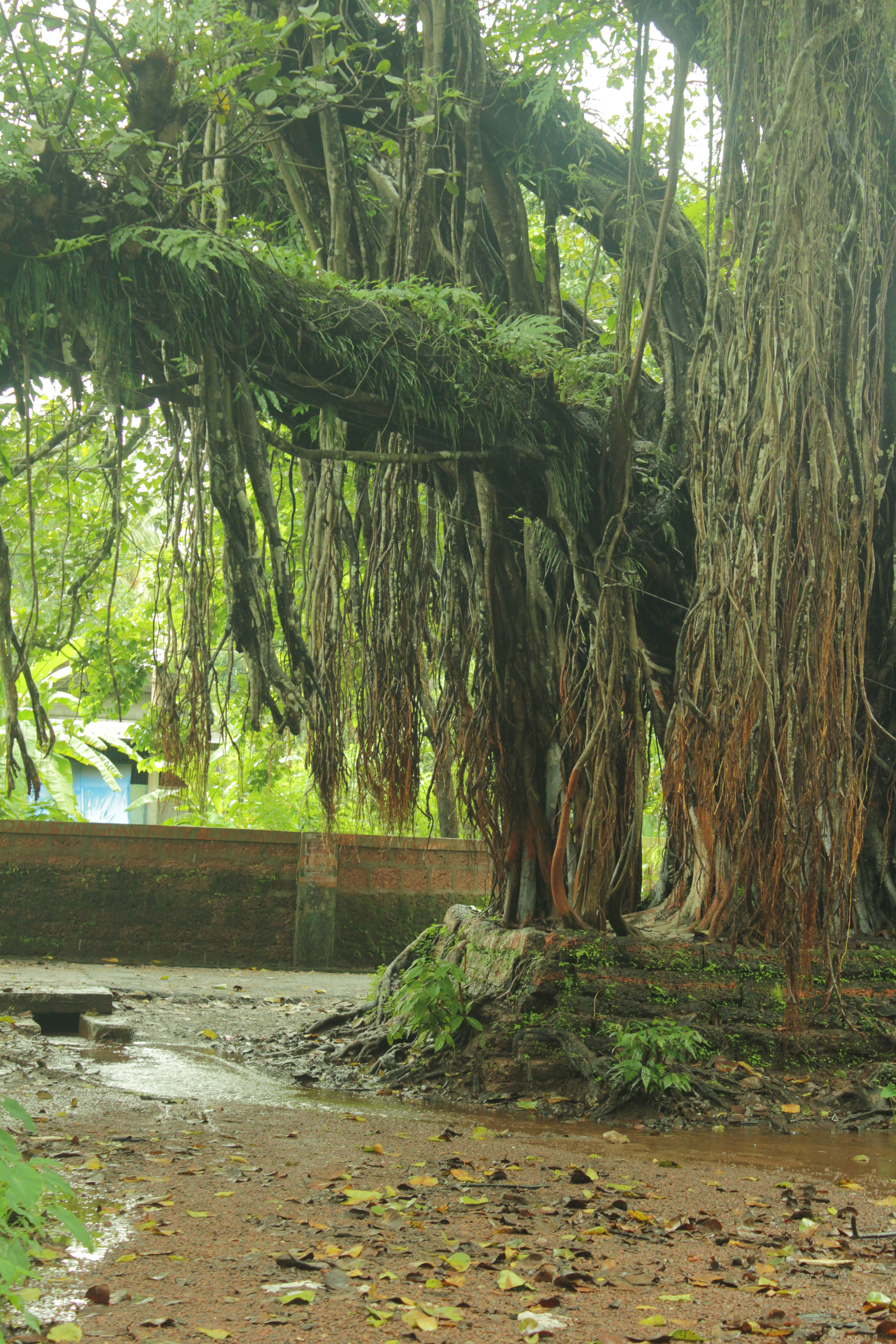
Banyan Tree at Trichambaram Temple

Trichambaram uthsavam is the annual festival of Trichambaram Temple in Kerala, South India. The festival lasts 14 days, beginning on Kumbham 22 of the Malayalam calendar, which generally falls on 6 March. It opens with the kodiyettam ceremony (hoisting of a religious flag), and comes to an end with Koodipiriyal on Meenam 6 (which generally falls on 20 March). In between these dates, for 11 days, thitambu nriththam (a sort of dance with the deities of Krishna and Balarama) is held at Pookoth Nada (1 km from Trichambaram temple). On the last day of the festival, the devotees run from Trichambram temple to Mazhur temple shouting Govinda!, Govinda!.

== Temple ==
The Trichambaram Temple is a sacred place of the Vaishnava sect that predates the 10th century, and the deity of the temple is Krishna. The inner part of the temple contains unique sculptures on the walls.

== Final procession ==
The procession on the final day of the festival starts from Taliparamba and proceeds to Mazhur village through the Chinmaya Mission Road. The devotees shout Govinda, Govinda all the way and they carry lighted cloth torches in the procession and Yellow sticks held by Yellow Stick Bearers who is referred to as the Security guards of The Deity.This procession is fast-paced and all the participants have to run during the ceremony. Even the policemen on duty inside the procession have no other option as the rituals require a running ceremony.
