= Altharakkal Sree Muthappan Madapura =

Hindu Temple in India

- ആൽത്തറക്കാൽ ശ്രീ മുത്തപ്പൻ മടപ്പുര
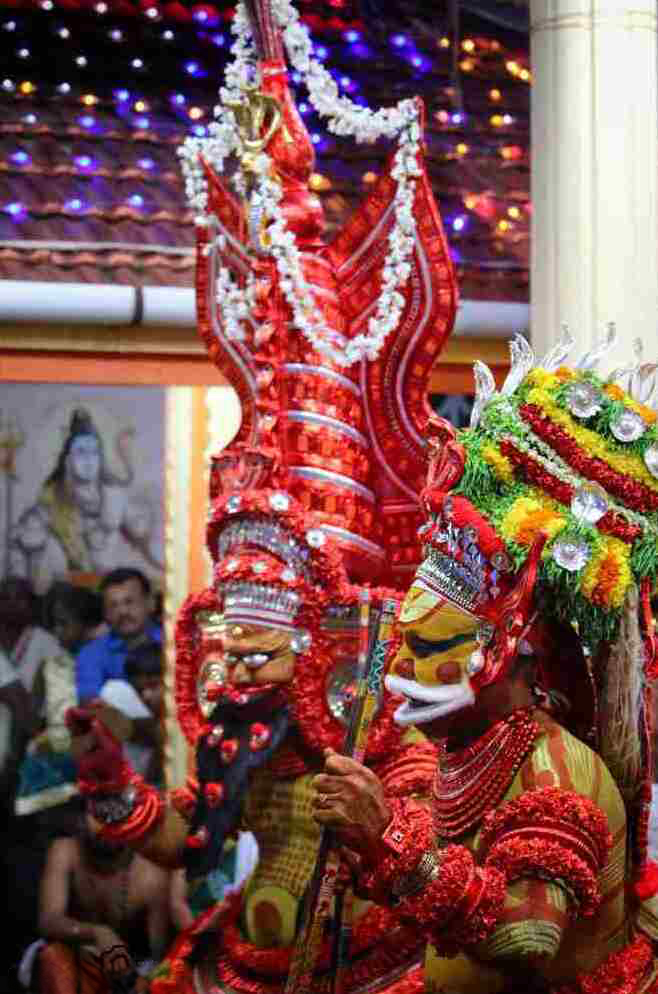
- Muthappan

- Location within Kerala

Religion
- Affiliation: Hinduism
- District: Kasaragod district
- Deity: Muthappan
- Governing body: Altharakkal Sree Muthappan Madapura Trust

Location
- State: Kerala
- Country: India
- Interactive map of Altharakkal Sree Muthappan Madapura
- Coordinates: 12.3645301°N 75.10438158°E

Architecture
- Type: Kerala Kavu Architecture

Altharakkal Sree Muthappan Madapura is a temple, located at Pullur Village about 6.2 km from Kanhangad and 25 km from Kasaragod City in Kasaragod District, Kerala. According to the local tradition the temple's deity, Muthappan, is a manifestation of the Hindu god Shiva.
