= Muthappan Temple =

Hindu temple in Parassinikadavu, India

Parassinikadavu Muthappan Temple
- Parassinikadavu Madappura
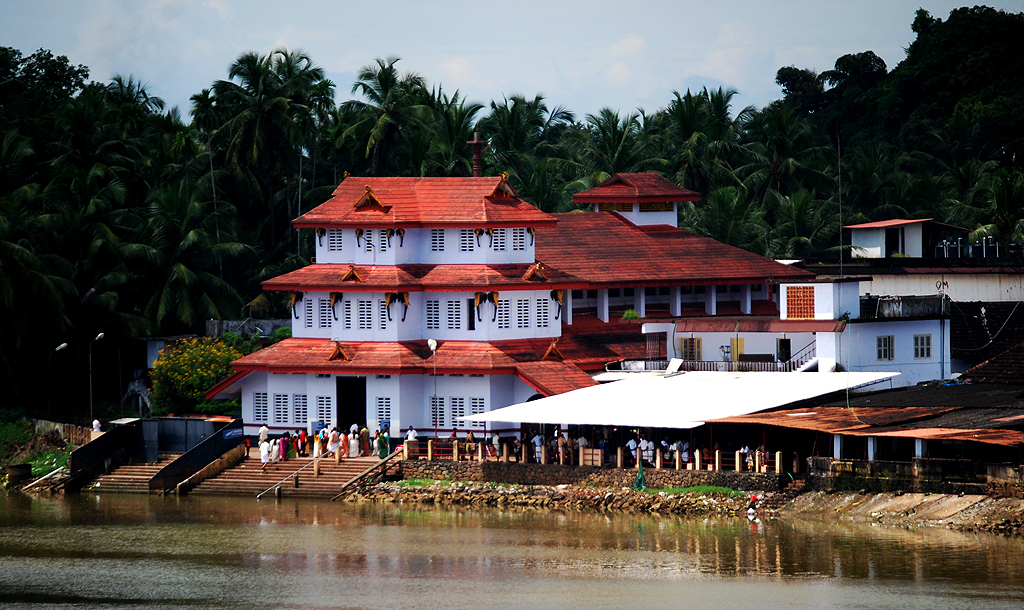
- Parassinikadavu Temple

- Location within Kerala

Religion
- Affiliation: Hinduism
- District: Kannur
- Deity: Muthappan
- Governing body: Malabar Devaswom Board

Location
- State: Kerala
- Country: India
- Coordinates: 11°58′56.87″N 75°24′7.22″E

Architecture
- Type: Kerala Kavu architecture

Parassini Madappura Sree Muthappan temple is a temple located at Parassinikadavu in Anthoor municipality on the banks of the Valapattanam river about 10 km (6.2 mi) from Taliparamba and 20 km (12 mi) from Kannur town in Kannur district, Kerala, India. Principal deity of the Thiyya community temple is Sree Muthappan, whose divinity is presented as a ritualistic theyyam enactment in two versions called Thiruvappan and Vellattam. According to the local tradition the presiding deity is a manifestation of Lord Shiva.

Vellattam and Thiruvappan are the generic names for two types of 'Theyyam Ketti-aadal'.

Vellattam is a minor version of the ritual enactment where the ornaments, decorations and parapharnelia are minimal thanks to which all actions including vaaythari (speech) is maximum and Attam (dance) will be at its peak. If one compares this level of enactment to the idol of a deity in a temple sanctum which is installed as per sathwic sasthra and vedic rituals, Vellattam is at par with the idol alone without the prabha-mandalam which circles it. An easier example is the Seeveli ceremony with only the small idol on top of the elephant.

On the other hand, Thiruvappana is the full version, with royal regalia and bigger dimension of prabhamandalam. Because the decorations are more and are of binding nature, the action is minimal and sluggish and the uriyaadal (replies to prayers) will be crisp, to the point and predictions will be accurate. To compare, Thiruvappana stands at par with temple idol with the Prabha-mandalam (representing the auric circle) around it and the Seeveli with the big Swarna-Kolam covering the small idol on top of the elephant.

Muthappan is considered as the manifestation of Lord Shiva himself in Nayattu (hunter) format. The Vellattam which comes initially is Siva himself as the said minimal version. But the Vellattam which comes along with the grand Thiruvappana of Muthappan later on, is the minimal version of Vishnu who according to mythology, comes to Siva's assistance when he started travelling with the poykannu (blindfold) and started suffering serious difficulties to travel and hunt for food.

The rituals of the temple are unique in that it does not follow the Satvic Brahminical form of worship, as in other Hindu temples of Kerala. The main mode of worship is the ritual enactment of both the versions of Muthappan, through a traditional dance known as Muthappan Theyyam. Fish, meat and toddy are the customary offerings to Muthappan. Muthappan Thiruvoppana Mahothsavam is the major festival of the temple, celebrated for three days every year on 19, 20 and 21 of Kumbham (the days correspond to 3, 4 and 5 March).

== The legends of Muthappan ==
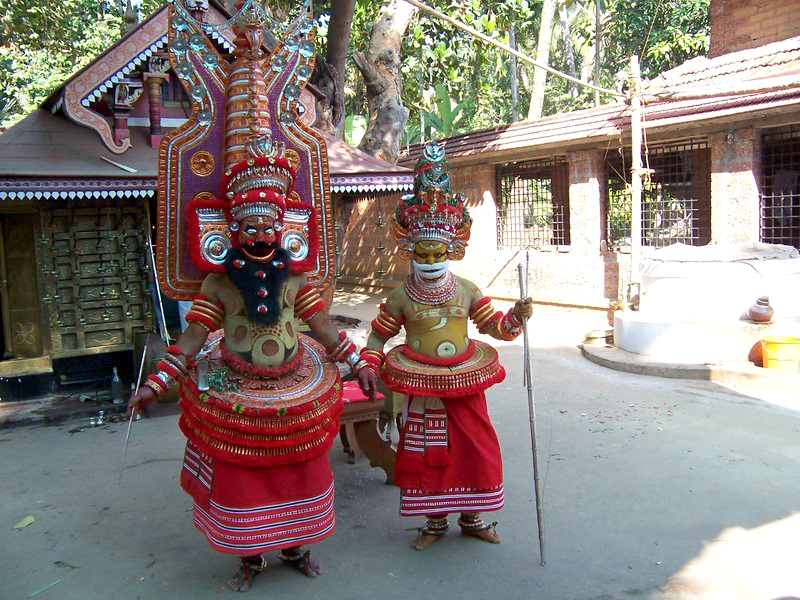
Thiruvappana or Valiya Muttapan (Vishnu) on left and the Vellatom or Cheriya Muttapan (Shiva) on right

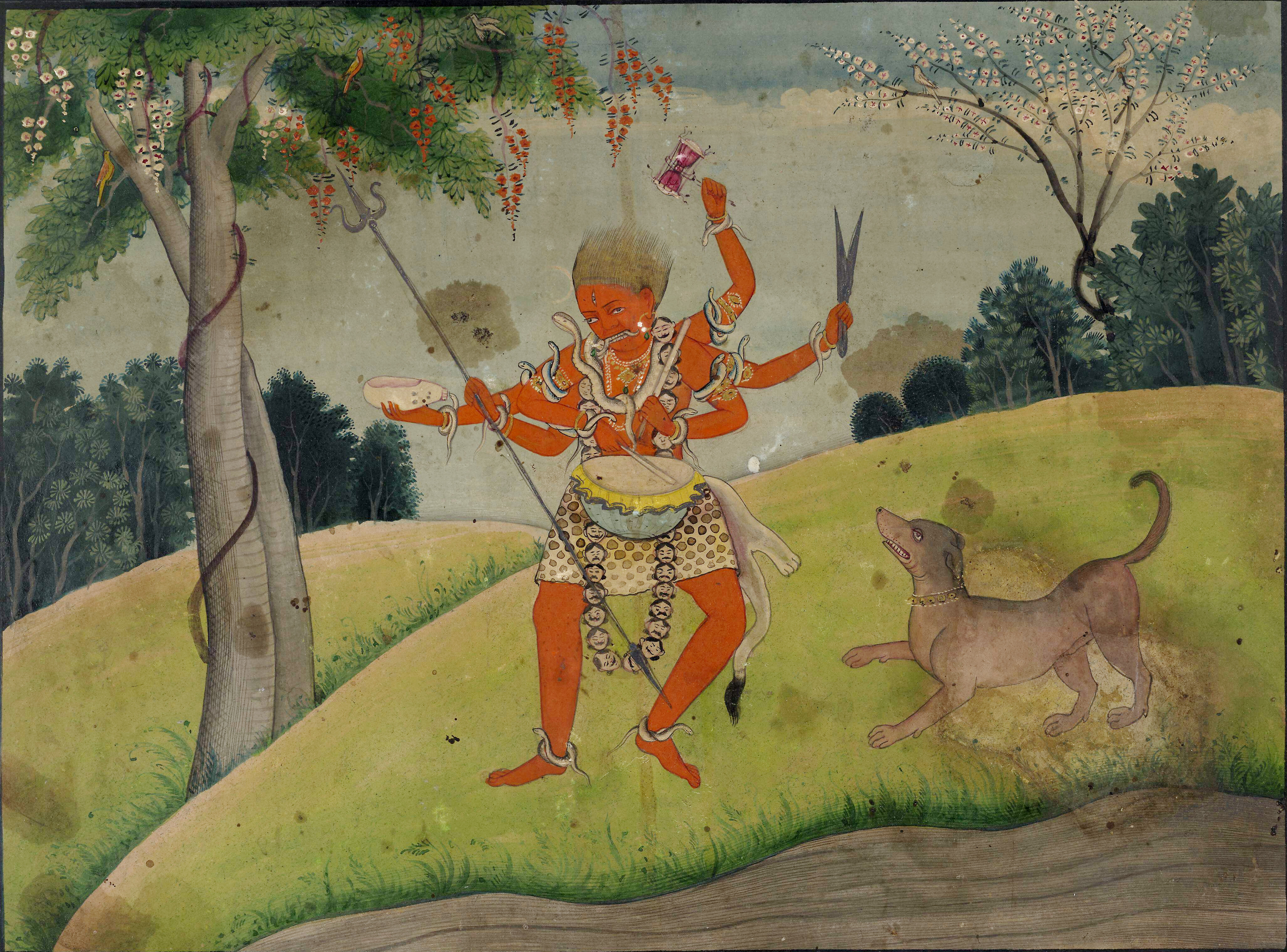
Lord Śiva in the form of Bhairava accompanied by a dog

A version of the legend of Ponnu Muthappan is narrated here: The King of Ayyankara Vazhunnor of Eruvessi village and his wife, Padikutty Amma, had no offspring. Padikutty was an ardent devotee of Shiva and when she found a baby floating in a basket of flowers in the river water when she was coming back after a bath in the river, she took it as the blessing of Lord Shiva, and so was her husband. The child grew up and in his boyhood, he was always for the benefit of downtrodden and poor people. However, to the agony of his family he practiced hunting, and also started eating flesh, which was not allowed for a Naduvazhi. Unable to bear the indictments from his family, the boy decided to leave home. When his mother attempted to stop him, he looked at her in fury and appeared in his original godly figure before the parent. She bowed down before her son. Nonetheless, she requested him to cover his eyes with a Poikannu, a type of shield for the eyes, since she was afraid that such a fiery look on another occasion may cause to emanate the cosmic force, Shakti, that could change the entire world. Wearing a shield on his eyes, he left the family, and passed through various villages in Malabar, such as Kunnathurpadi, Puralimala, Padavil, Thillenkeri, Kannapuram, Parassinikadavu and Valluvankadav.

The legend relates Muthappan with a tribal family for the divine boy started being called as "Muthappan". Accordingly, when he reached a village called Kunnathurpadi, he got a tribesman, Chantan as his friend. One day, when he saw Chantan tapping toddy from Palm tree the boy asked for it but was denied. All of sudden, Chantan was cursed and became a stone. His wife prayed and offered to perform the rituals, Oottu, Tiruvappana and Amruthakalasam, to propitiate the boy in the month of Dhanu. The boy relented and gave her husband back. The Chantan family started to conduct pooja to propitiate the boy and they called him in the name: "Muthappan".

However, according to another version of the legend Muthappan climbed the coconut tree and emptied the toddy jar in the absence of Chantan. When Chantan returned and saw Muthappan holding the jar, he was provoked and defied the latter. It was at this instant, Chantan was cursed.

The legend also describes a dog which always followed Muthappan throughout his journey. Hence, in the temple of Muthappan, dogs are considered divine and the temple entrance has an idol of dog, at both sides.

== Rituals and festivals ==
The ritualistic enactment of both the minimal and maxima versions of Sree Muthappan, Thiruvappana and Vellattam, is performed daily in the early morning and in the evening. Puthari Thiruvappana festival, conducted on 16 Vrichikam (this Malayalam day corresponds to 1 or 2 December), is the first Thiruvappana of the temple year. It is associated with the harvesting season of the region. The last Thiruvappana of the temple year is on 30 Kanni every year.

== See also ==
- Anthoor
- Lokanarkavu Temple
- Sree Muthappan
- Parassinikkadavu
- Rajarajeshwara Temple
- Kannur
- Kunnathoor Padi
- Sree Muthappan Temple Nileshwar
- Temples of Kerala

== Photo gallery ==
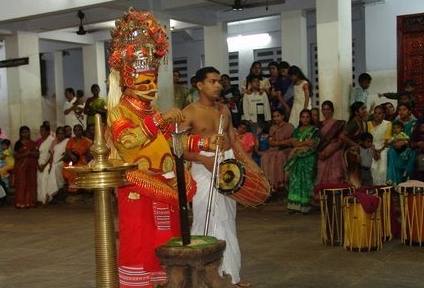
Muthappan Theyyam as Lord Vishnu

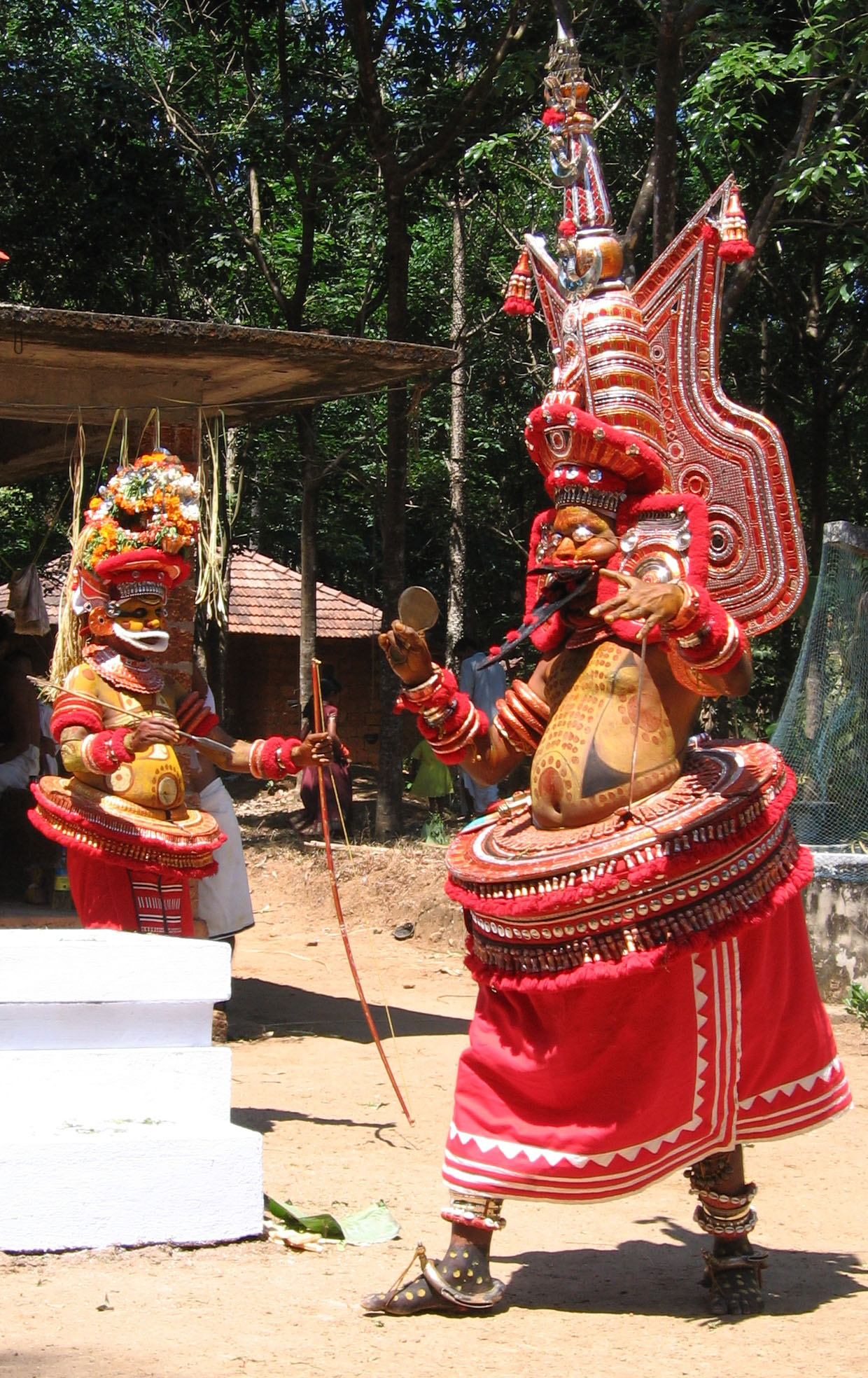
Muthappan Theyyam as Lord Vishnu and Lord Shiva

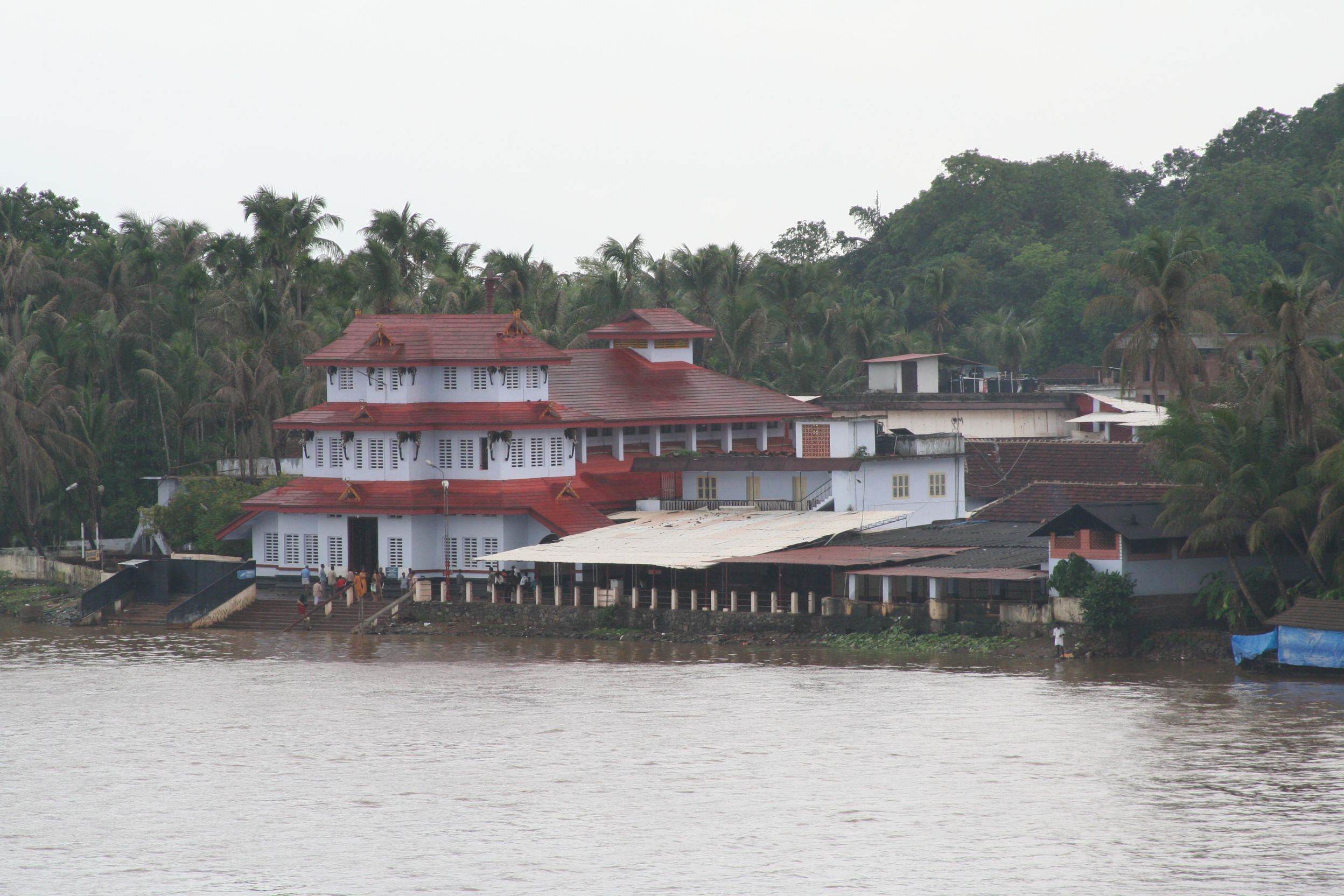
Muthappan Temple view
