= Kunnathoor Padi =

- village
- Location in Kerala, India Kunnathoor Padi (India)
- Coordinates: 12.0786°N 75.6199°E
- Country: India
- State: Kerala
- District: Kannur

Government
  - Body: Payyavoor Panchayat

Languages
  - Official: Malayalam, English
- Time zone: UTC+5:30 (IST)
- ISO 3166 code: IN-KL

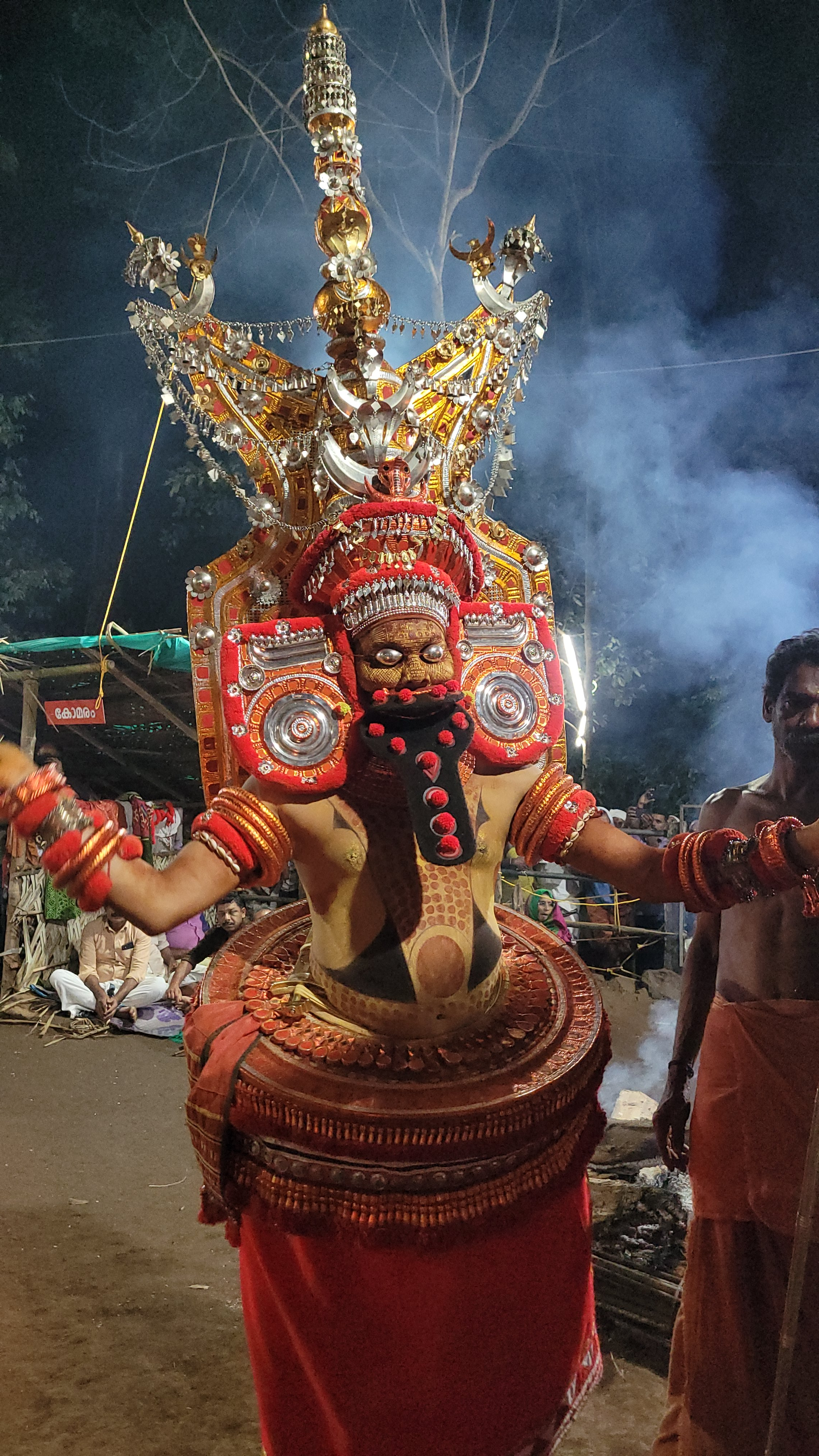
Thiruvappana At Kunnathoorpadi

Kunnathoor Padi (also Kunnathur Padi) is a village in the Payyavoor Grama Panchayat of the Kannur district in Kerala, India. It serves as the historic center and abode (Aroodam) for the folk Hindu deity Sree Muthappan. Located 3,000 feet above sea level atop Udumbumala in the Sahyadri (Western Ghats) mountains, the region was historically ruled by the Mannanar dynasty. According to regional tradition, this historical era coincides with the lifetime and travels of Sree Muthappan. The site was managed by the Kunnummal Idathil Thiyyar family, a feudal lineage under the Mannanars, from whom the name Kunnathoor Padi originated.

Unlike conventional Hindu temples, Kunnathoor Padi features no permanent architecture. The sacred rituals and the annual festival are conducted entirely within a natural forest clearing. According to local belief, this open-air setting honors a declaration by Sree Muthappan, who stated, "Fallen leaves, a spring, a large mountain, a round stone, forest and palm trees are enough for me." During the festival season, a temporary thatched clearing (Madapura) is erected to serve as the sanctum.

== History ==
This forested, hilly area known as Kunnathoor Padi serves as a historic shrine (Aroodam) closely tied to the regional ruling dynasties of North Malabar. The area was connected to the ancient Kuttan dynasty, who ruled from the nearby Purali hill. It later became the central shrine of the Mannanar royal family, a prominent Thiyya dynasty. Traditional beliefs also hold that the Mannanar palace was the birthplace of Sree Muthappan's foster grandfather. On top of the hill sits the shrine of Patikutiyamma, where distinct rituals take place. During the thirty-day annual festival, the Mannanar rulers were traditionally required to fast by drinking thinakkanji (millet porridge). Only the Mannanar king and his queen (the Patni) were permitted to sit on designated seats. All other visiting nobles and citizens had to sit on wild leaves spread across the ground. The traditional priests (Shanthikars) at the site belong to two Thiyya lineages holding the titles of Mandakurup and Rairukurup.

The traditional administrative and ritual structure shifted under British colonial rule. Following the murder of the last Mannanar ruler, Kunhikelappan Mannanar, in 1902, the British government seized the dynasty's lands. The Karakkatidam Nayanar family subsequently secured the right to collect taxes for the region from the British base at Thalassery, using gold as security at local temples. Through this tax-collecting role, management of the Kunnathur Padi shrine was transferred to the Karakkatidam Nayanars.

Following India's independence, the legacy of this arrangement led to legal disputes. The Karakkatidam Nayanar family claimed ownership rights over a related shrine, the Parassinikkadavu Muthappan Madapura, citing their historical role as British tax collectors. The Parassinikkadavu family challenged the claim in court, which ultimately dismissed the Nayanar family's ownership assertions.

== Annual Festival ==
During the annual festival season, a temporary Sreekovil (sanctum sanctorum) known as the Madappura is erected in a forest clearing. This site features a natural glade and a central cave, flanked on either side by a palm tree. On the west of the Madappura is a stone, a rock stand, and a mud platform. To the north lies a natural spring called Thiruvankadavu, beyond which is Aadipadi.

The Thanthris (chief priests) perform the purification rituals, which include Sudhi, Pasudanam, Punyaham, Ganapati homam, and Bhagavathiseva. The Malayirakkal (invocation ritual) of Sree Muthappan is conducted by the Puralimala temple authorities, contrasting with other madappuras where the ritual is typically performed by Kunnathoor Padi priests themselves.

Unlike most other Sree Muthappan centers, the Thiruvappana and Vellattam (the two ritualized deity personifications) do not appear simultaneously at the Padi.

The festival commences in the Malayalam month of Dhanu and concludes in Makaram (falling between mid-December and mid-January).

== Worship Information ==
Sree Muthappan is a Hindu deity worshipped commonly in Kannur district of Kerala, India. Muthappan and Thiruvappan are considered to be a manifestation of Shiva and Vishnu and hence, Muthappan wholly represents the idea of Brahman, the unity of God, as expressed in the Vedas.

Worship of Muthappan is unique in that it does not follow the Sattvic (Brahminical) form of worship as in other Hindu temples. The main mode of worship is not by idol worship, but using a ritual enactment of Muthappan. Fish is used as an offering to Muthappan and people of all castes, religions and nationalities are permitted to enter the temple and take part in the worship.

Muthappan is also the principal deity in the worship ritual. The ritual performers of Muthappan Theyyam belong to the tribal community of Kerala. It is unique because in Kerala both the upper-caste Brahmins and the lower-caste tribals have a significant contribution to the major forms of worship.

Kunnathur Padi, the Aroodam of Sri Muthappan, is located in Payyavoor Village of Taliparamba Taluk in Kannur District. Kunnathurpadi festival which starts in Malayalam month of Dhanu and ends in Makaram is conducted in a natural setting because Sree Muthappan said that "Fallen leaves, a spring, a large mountain, a round stone, forest and palm trees are enough for me." There are no temples for Muthappan in Kunnathur Padi. This area is beautiful with its greenery and is 3,000 feet above sea level atop Udumbamala in the Sahyadri Mountains. The divinity and the purity of this place with its breathtaking beauty have been maintained for centuries. Any visitor coming to this area will feel the blessing hand of Sri Muthappan and will be able to cross the thin line that separates the spiritual existence and the miseries of the material world. There is an open place and a cave in the middle of the forest. During the festival season, a temporary Madappura is erected here which is called Sreekovil. On the west side of this Madappura, there is a stone, a rock stand and a mud platform. On each side of the cave there is a palm tree. On the north side, there is a spring called Thiruvankadavu. Beyond that is Aadipadi.

Thanthries do the purifying rituals (Sudhi, Pasudanam, Punyaham, Ganapati Homam and Bhagavathiseva). The Malayirakkal (invoking) of Sri Muthappan is done by Puralimala. In all other Madappuras this is done by Kunnathurpadi.

== Invoking Sri Muthappan ==
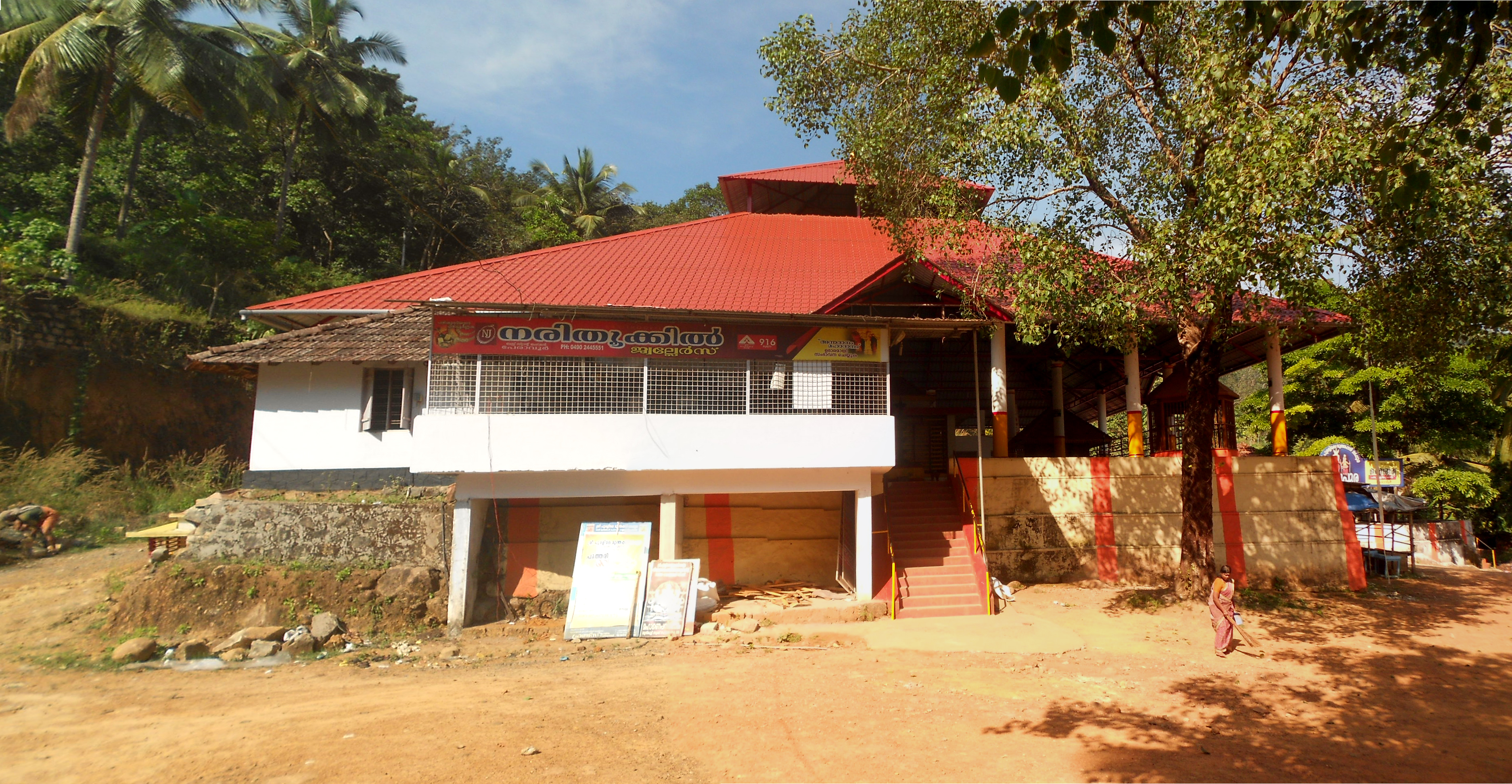
Puralimala muthappan temple

At Kunnathurpadi, the invoking of Sri Muthappan (malayirakkal) is from Puralimala whereas at Puralimala, it is from Kunnathurpadi. In all other madappuras, this is done from Kunnathurpadi.

On the first day of the festival four theyyams appear at Padi: Puthiya Sri Muthappan, Puramkala Sri Muthappan, Naduvazhissan Daivam and Thiruavappana. The concept of Vannan about Sri Muthappan is that of Eiver Muthappan (five Muthappans) – Puramkala Sri Muthappan, Puralimala Sri Muthappan (Thiruvappana), Nambala Sri Muthappan (Nambala is ant hill) Sri Muthappan (Vellattam), Thoovakkally Sri Muthappan and Andu Muthappan. Muthappan does Pallivetta and accepts veethu (madhu). One of the acts depicts the Lord's writing on the granite stone with His arrow. He is writing moola mantras.

One thing at Padi is that Thiruvappana and Vellattam do not appear simultaneously as in many other Sri Muthappan centres. He comes at night and goes at night. After the divine dance is over, he sits on the platform and asks Nayanar also to sit in front of him. Sri Muthappan recites the pattola. It is the history of the Lord and His relationship with the Vanavar. Bhandaram (coffer) is brought. Devotees do not put anything directly into the coffer. Offerings are given to the Lord in hand, and Bhagvan places them in the coffer. Then begins the most important aspect of the festival: Sri Muthappan starts His arulapadu; the long wait of the devotees is over and He hears their grievances, consoles them and blesses them. Then Vellattam appears after that.

== See also ==
- Kottiyoor Temple
- Muthappan temple
- Parassinikkadavu
- Rajarajeshwara temple
- Temples of Kerala
