= Parassinikkadavu Snake Park =

Parassinkkadavu Snake Park
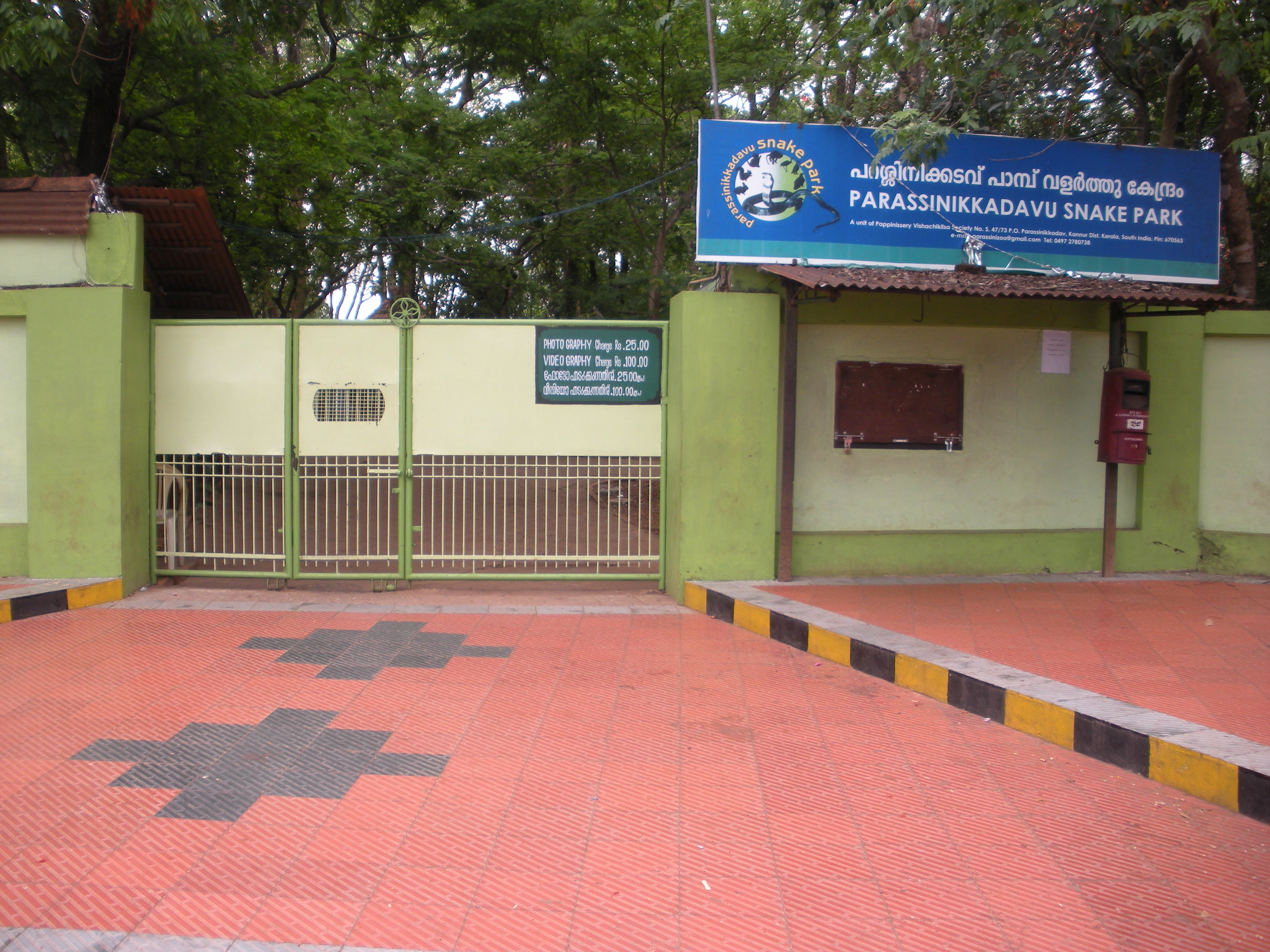
- Entrance
- Interactive map of Parassinkkadavu Snake Park
- 11.9902°N 75.3893°E
- Location: Parassinikkadavu, Kannur, India
- Memberships: CZA

The Parassinkkadavu Snake Park is located in Parassinikkadavu, Anthoor Municipality, Kannur district, north Kerala in south India. It is about 16 kilometres (9.9 mi) from Kannur city and about 2 kilometres (1.2 mi) from National Highway (NH) 17, en route to Taliparamba from Kannur.

== Snakes on exhibition ==
The park houses a variety of snakes and other small animals, including the Spectacled cobra, King Cobra, Russell's viper, Krait and various pit vipers. There is also a large collection of non-venomous snakes including pythons. The park is dedicated to the preservation and conservation of snakes, many species of which are gradually becoming extinct. In a live show, trained personnel play and 'interact' with a variety of snakes, including cobras and vipers, and try to quell mythical fears and superstitions about snakes.

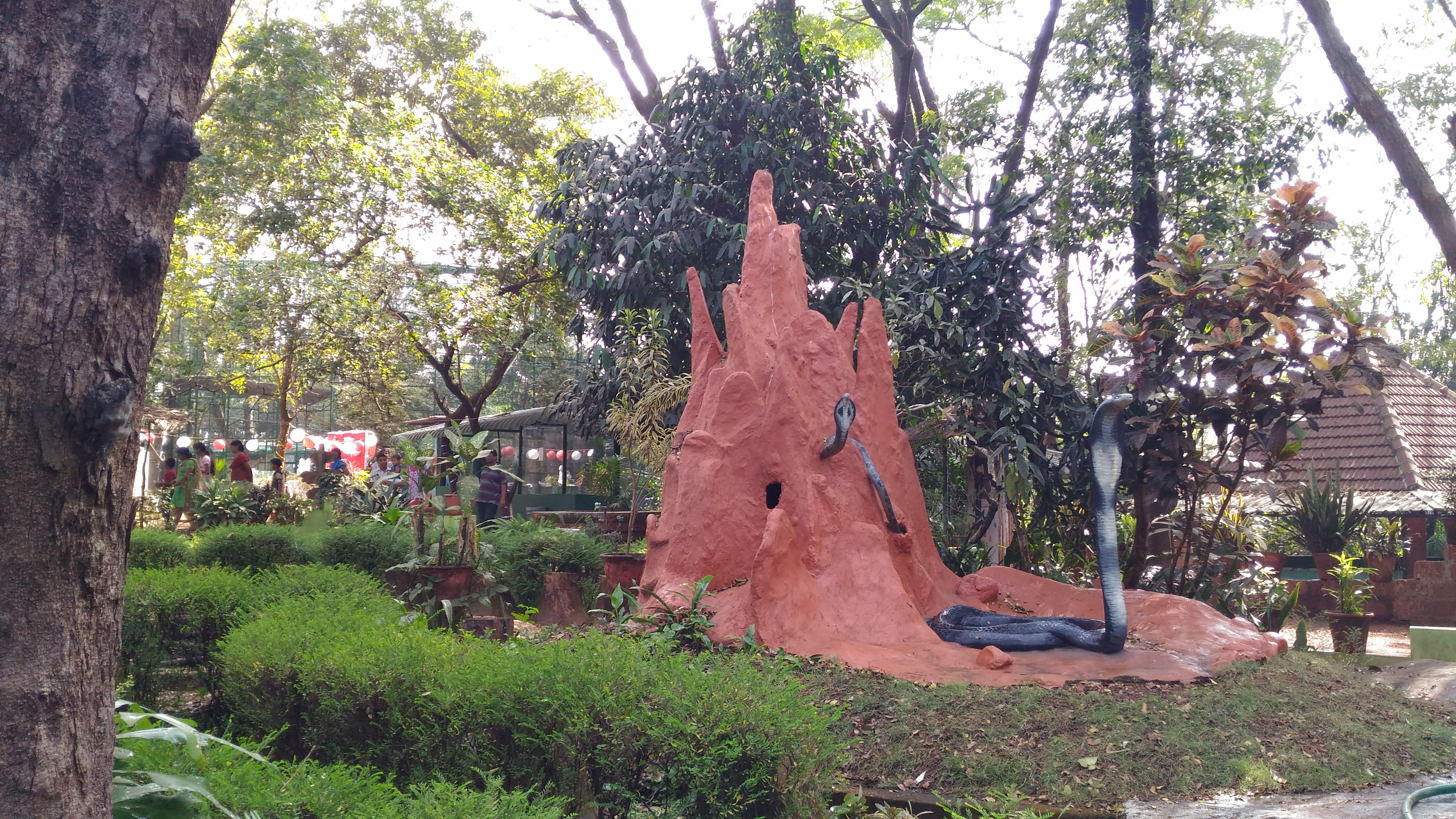
A shot from the snake park Parassinikkadavu

== Snake bite treatment center ==
Pappinisseri Visha Chikitsa Kendra (Pappinisseri Venom Treatment Center) was started in 1964 with the intention of treating snake bites (snake envenomation). It was created in memory of the Late Shree C. P. Kumaran Vaidyar and functions as a center for advanced clinical research and literary documentation in Agada Tantra.

Ever since its inception in 1964, it has had a virtual monopoly in treating and clinically documenting snakebite cases - more than a million of them. The main physician at the Pappinisseri Visha Chikitsa Kendra is Dr. B. Prabhakaran.

In 1993, the park was destroyed by the ruling party (2017) of Kerala due to political issues with the minister MV Raghavan at that time regarding the Pariyaram Medical College. Political issues led some followers of the political party to vandalize and arson the park, as a result of which, many rare species of reptiles, e.g., king cobras, birds and some other animals were brutally burnt to death.

== See also ==
- Parassinikkadavu
- Dharmashala, Kannur
- Mayyil
- Mangattuparamba
