= Devaswom boards in Kerala =

Socio-religious trusts in India

Devaswom (Sanskrit: dēvasvaṁ; transl. "Belonging to the God") are socio-religious trusts in India, whose members are nominated by the government and community. They oversee Hindu temples and their assets to ensure their smooth operation in accordance with traditional rituals and customs. The devaswom system notably exists in the state of Kerala, where most temples are either managed by Government of Kerala-controlled devaswoms or private bodies or families. The properties of each temple are deemed to be the personal property of the presiding deity of the temple, and are managed through a body of trustees who bear allegiance to that deity.

The five Kerala devaswoms—Guruvayur, Travancore, Malabar, Cochin, and Koodalmanikyam—manage nearly 3,000 temples together.

== Governance and administration ==
Devaswom boards are statutory autonomous bodies constituted by the government to administer, manage, and oversee Hindu temples and their assets.

At the government level, Minister for Devaswoms is a Cabinet-level position responsible for policy formulation, oversight, and overall political leadership of the Devaswoms portfolio. The incumbent Devaswom Minister is K. Muraleedharan.

Devaswom boards function under the administrative supervision of the Government of Kerala, primarily through the Revenue (Devaswoms) Department. The current Devaswom Secretary is M. G. Rajamanickam, IAS.

== Revenues ==
The five devaswoms earn about 1,000 crore rupees annually.

Devaswom	Annual revenue (crores of INR)	Net assets (crores of INR)	Number of temples	Richest temples (annual revenue in crores (INR))
Guruvayur	400	2500	12	Sri Guruvayurappan Temple (400)
Travancore	683 (2017-18)	N/A	1240	Sabarimala Sree Dharma Sastha Temple (200); Chettikulangara Devi temple, Mavelikkara (100) Haripad Sree Subrahmanya Swami Temple; Ettumanoor Siva Temple (60); Malayalappuzha Devi Temple (5.75)
Malabar	80	N/A	1337	Kadambuzha Sri Parvati Temple (8)
Cochin	50	N/A	403	Chottanikkara Devi Temple (6)
Koodalmanikyam	N.A.	N/A	13	Koodalmanikyam Temple

== Travancore Devaswom Board ==
The Travancore Devaswom Board is an autonomous body formed by the Travancore Cochin Hindu Religious Institutions Act of 1950. Sabarimala is the main income source of the Board, with 255 crore rupees accruing to it from the temple during the 2017 pilgrimage season. The income from the rest of the temples in Kerala was 57 crore rupees.

== Malabar Devaswom Board ==
The Malabar Devaswom Board was formed by the H.R & C.E (Amendment) Ordinance of 2008 of the Government of Kerala. The board has nine members. There are five divisions: Kasaragod Division, Thalassery Division, Kozhikode Division, Malappuram Division, and Palakkad Division. Temples are in Special Temple category and the others in A, B, C, D categories.

== Guruvayur Devaswom Board ==
The Guruvayur Devaswom Board was formed to administer the activities of Guruvayur Temple.

== Cochin Devaswom Board ==
The Cochin Devaswom Board was formed under the act of XV of Travancore–Cochin Hindu Religious institutions Act, 1950 to make provisions for the administration, supervision, and control of incorporated and unincorporated Devaswoms and of other Hindu Religious Endowments and funds under the Ruling area of the former Cochin State. Each temples on CDB has controlled by devaswoms.

== Koodalmanikyam Devaswom Board ==
The Koodalmanikyam Devaswom Board is situated in Irinjalakuda, Thrissur district. It manages the Koodalmanikyam Temple.

== Working ==
Prior to 2015, the appointments to the various posts in the devawoms were governed by the provisions in the Madras Hindu Religious Act and Charitable Endowment Act 1951, Koodalmanikyam Devaswom Act 2005, Travancore-Cochin Hindu Religious Institutions Act 1950, and Guruvayoor Devaswom Act 1978.

In 2015, based on the recommendations by the Justice Paripoornan Commission, the Congress-led UDF government set up an autonomous body for recruitment in the Dewaswom Boards.

=== Reservation ===
About half of the Devaswom board recruitments are based on reservation.

- Ezhava (17%)
- Hindu OBC excluding Ezhava (6%)
- SC/ST (12%)
- Economically backward High caste Hindus (10%)

== Issues and Controversies ==
=== Financial mismanagement and audit issues during 2026 Global Ayyappa Sangamam ===
Kerala Devaswom Boards, particularly the Travancore Devaswom Board (TDB), have faced repeated allegations of financial mismanagement, with courts and audit authorities flagging serious irregularities in accounting and auditing practices.

In 2025–26, the Kerala High Court examined the audited accounts of the Global Ayyappa Sangamam, an event organised by the Travancore Devaswom Board, and found several irregularities. The court found that there has been discrepancies between the Board’s public claims and the figures shown in the audit report, including improper accounting of items distributed to devotees such as aravana, appam, and other ritual materials. The High Court also stated that audited figures appeared to contradict earlier statements by Devaswom authorities regarding sponsorship receipts and reimbursements.

The Travancore Devaswom Board rejected media reports on the audit findings and described them as misleading. The Board maintained that the expenditures were legitimate and that clarifications would be provided before the court. The Kerala government distanced itself from the controversy, stating that financial accountability for the event lay solely with the Travancore Devaswom Board. Ministers indicated that the Board was responsible for clarifying audit objections and any reported financial losses.

=== Political interference and appointments ===
In 2025, the appointment K. Jayakumar, as the president of the Travancore Devaswom Board became the subject of legal scrutiny when a senior Indian Administrative Service (IAS) officer challenged the appointment in the Kerala High Court. The petitioner argued that the appointment violated provision which says a government employee cant be chosen as president.

In 2025, the Bharatiya Janata Party alleged violations of established recruitment norms. The BJP state general secretary M.T.Ramesh alleged that the CPM workers are being appointed as employees under Guruvayur Dewaswom and money is being collected from jobseekers to conduct Dewaswom recruitment exams.

=== Administrative and governance failures ===
The Kerala High Court has on multiple occasions criticised the Travancore Devaswom Board for administrative inefficiencies, including failure to establish effective internal vigilance systems, delays in addressing complaints of malpractice and crowd management.

Administrative failures, inadequate infrastructure, poor coordination, and lapses in enforcement during peak pilgrimage seasons have drawn criticism from the Kerala High Court over poor crowd control and pilgrim safety at major temples.

=== Attempt to abolish Devaswom ===
In 2018, the Supreme Court of India agreed to examine the petition started by Subramanian Swamy and T. G. Mohandas to abolish government interference in temples through the devaswom board. U. U. Lalit and K. M. Joseph issued notice to the Government of Kerala and Devaswom Board of Travanacore and Cochin, and sought their response in six weeks. In 2019, the Government of Kerala opposed Swamy's plea.
