= Parassinikkadavu =

Place in Kerala

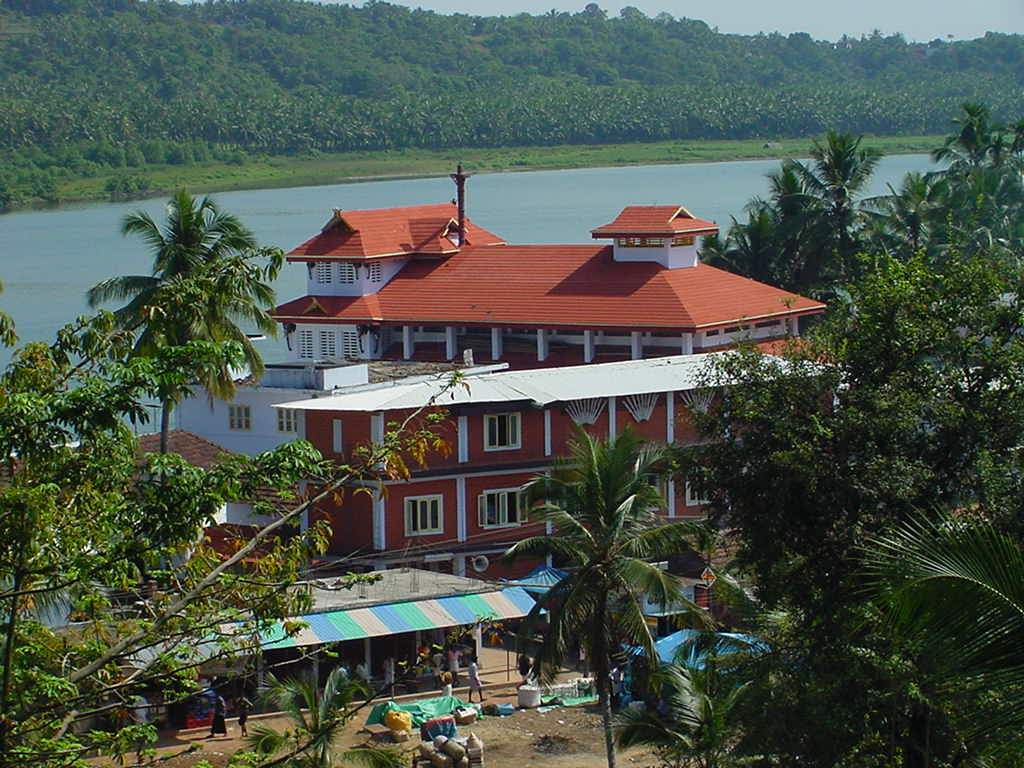
- Muthappan Temple At Parassinikkadavu

- Location in Kerala, India
- Coordinates: 11°59′00″N 75°23′55″E
- Country: India
- State: Kerala
- District: Kannur

Parassinkkadavu is a small town in Anthoor Municipality about 20km from Kannur.

== Notable Places ==
- Muthappan temple
- Parassinikkadavu Snake Park

== See also ==
- Anthoor
- Parassinikkadavu Snake Park
- Kannur
- Theyyam
- Parassinikkadavu Temple
- Kunnathoor Padi
- Rajarajeshwara Temple
