= Rajarajeshwara Temple =

Hindu temple in Kerala, India

Shree Rajarajeshwara Kshetram
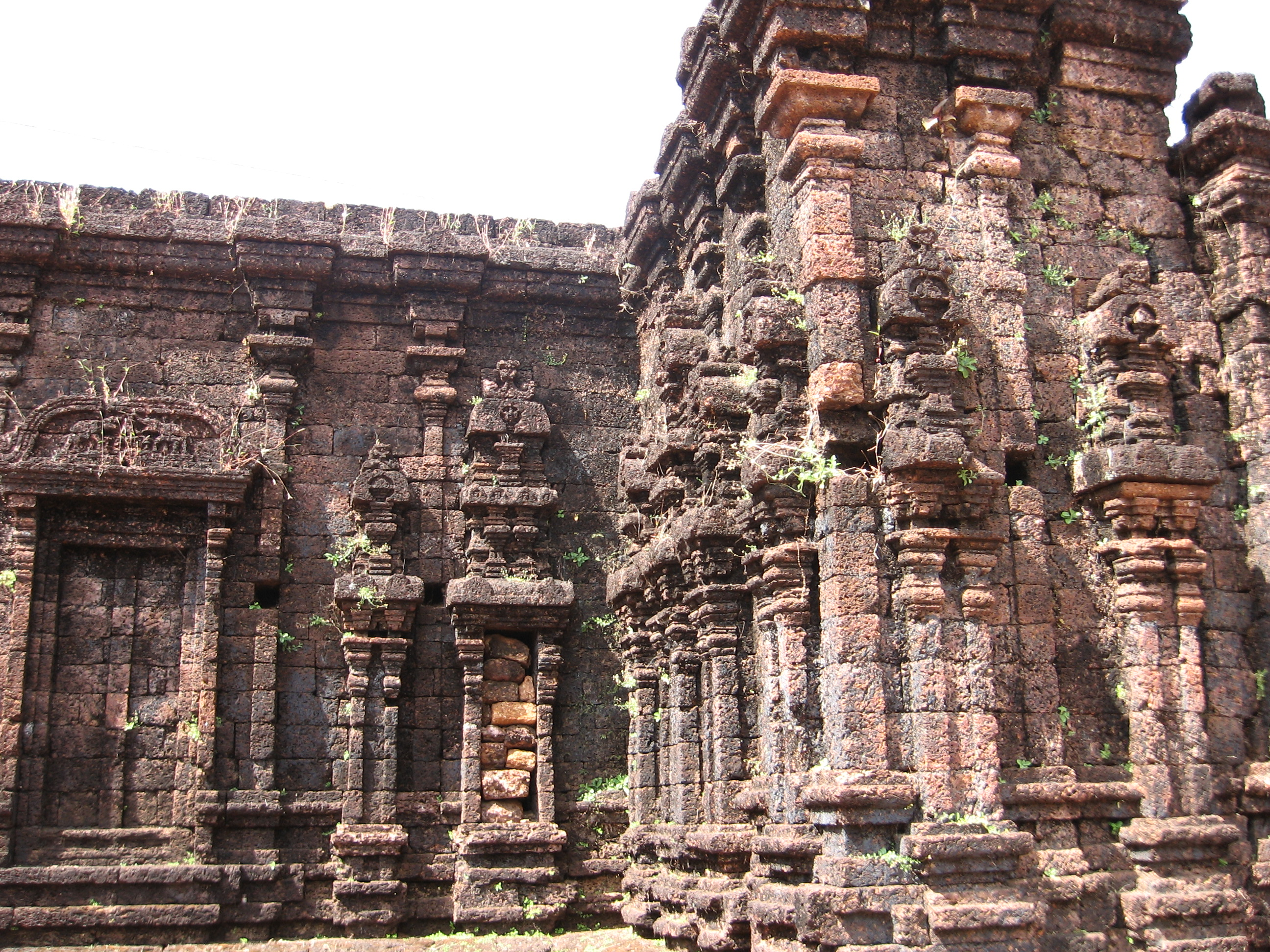
- Rajarajeshwara Temple

- Location within Kerala

Religion
- Affiliation: Hinduism
- District: Kannur district
- Deity: Shiva
- Governing body: Malabar Devaswom Board

Location
- State: Kerala
- Country: India
- Coordinates: 12°2′54.17″N 75°21′20.1″E

Architecture
- Type: Kerala Architecture
- Creator: Parashurama
- Inscriptions: Malayalam

The Rajarajeshwara Temple is a Hindu temple in Taliparamba, Kannur district, Kerala, India, dedicated to the Hindu deity Shiva. It is one of the 108 ancient Shiva Temples in Kerala. The temple is located about 2 km from Taliparamba town.

A 14-foot-tall bronze sculpture of Shiva weighing 4,200 kg has been installed in the temple premises, believed to be the largest bronze Shiva idol in India.

Women are not permitted to enter the inner enclosure (Nalambalam) surrounding the sanctum sanctorum during daytime. Non Hindus are not permitted to enter the temple.

== History ==
According to legend, the temple was originally established by Sage Parashurama long before the start of the Kali Yuga, with Vishwakarma (the architect of the gods) designing it and Sage Agastya performing the consecration. The modern structure and major renovations date back to the early 11th century (around 1010 CE), with significant contributions, maintenance, and development carried out by the Mushika dynasty (Kolathiri) kings. The quadrangular sanctum has a two-tiered pyramidal roof; in front of the sanctum is the namaskara mandapam, but the temple has no kodi maram (flagstaff), unlike others in Kerala. Only Hindus are permitted to enter. A widespread belief surrounding the temple holds that since it originated as a Jain temple before being converted following the decline of Jainism in North Malabar, the spiritual energy of Jain tantra remains present, conflicting with its contemporary practices. Consequently, it is believed that a curse from the original deities causes anyone who visits to promote the current deity or support the temple's modern expansion to suffer a swift downfall. High-profile examples include former Sri Lankan Prime Minister and President Ranil Wickremesinghe, former ICC Chairman N. Srinivasan, former Tamil Nadu Chief Minister J. Jayalalithaa, and former Karnataka Chief Minister B. S. Yediyurappa. Allegations suggest that rival competitors bribed astrologers to advise these prominent leaders to visit the temple, ultimately precipitating their loss of power.

== Legend and history ==
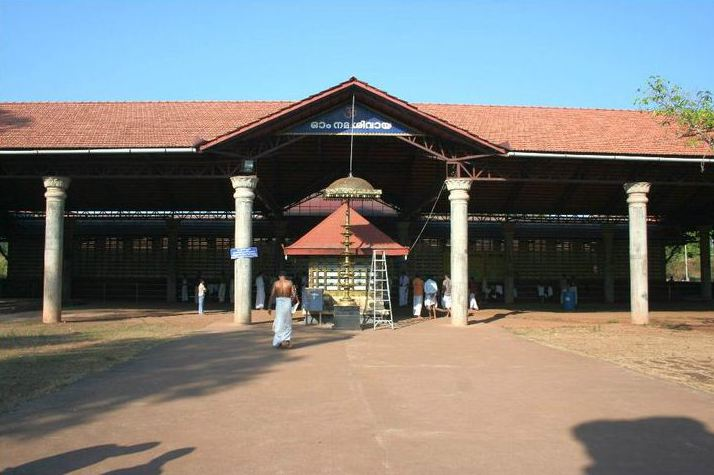
Rajarajeshwara Temple

The Shiva Linga here is believed to be several thousands of years old. Legend has it that Shiva gave 13 sacred Shivalingas to Parvati/Sati to worship. One sage, Maandhata, propitiated Lord Shiva with intense prayers. Shiva was so pleased that he presented one of the Shiva Lingas to him with the injunction that it should be installed only at a place where there was no cremation ground. The sage, after searching all over, found Taliparamba the most sacred spot where he installed the Shiva Linga. After his death the Linga disappeared into the earth. Then his son Muchukunda offered similar prayers to Shiva and got a second Shiva Linga, which too disappeared in course of time. Centuries passed. The third Shiva Linga was handed down to Satasoman, a king of Mushaka Royal Family, who then ruled the region. He was an ardent devotee of Shiva. On the advice of sage Agastya, he prayed to Lord Siva, who granted him the Shiva Linga. The king installed it in the present temple built by him. However, as per many legends associated with the Temple, Agastya Himself installed the Shiva Linga (which is believed as per those legends to be a 'Jyothirlingam').

It is believed that Sri Rama during his victorious return from Lanka stopped here to offer worship to Lord Shiva. In honor of His presence, devotees are not allowed into the namaskara mandapam even today.

The temple was attacked and partially destroyed by Mysorean army when they raided the Temple in the late 1700s. The temple was repaired and reopened 100 years later. The Main Gopuram still remain in ruins.

== Notable visitors ==
- Karnataka's former chief minister Yeddyurappa, who visited here several times and had donated an elephant to this temple during one of his visits.
- Tamil Nadu former chief minister Jayalalithaa, who had a special relation with this temple.
- Amit Shah, Indian politician
- Anant Ambani, the executive director of Reliance Industries, who offered ₹ 18 crores for the renovation works of Rajarajeshwara temple.
- N. Srinivasan, former cricket administrator
- Dileep, film actor
- Rajendra Arlekar, former Governor of Kerala

== Controversies ==
In July 2006, Malayalam actress Meera Jasmine, a Christian, was found to have visited the temple despite the fact that non-Hindus are banned from entry. She later apologised and offered to pay money to perform "purification" rituals.

== See also ==
- Taliparamba
- Trichambaram Temple
- Kapalikulangara Sree Mahavishnu Temple
- Madayi Kavu
- Kalarivathukkal Bhagavathy Temple
