= Thiruvancheri Kavu =

Shakteya temple in Kerala, India

Thiruvancheri kavu
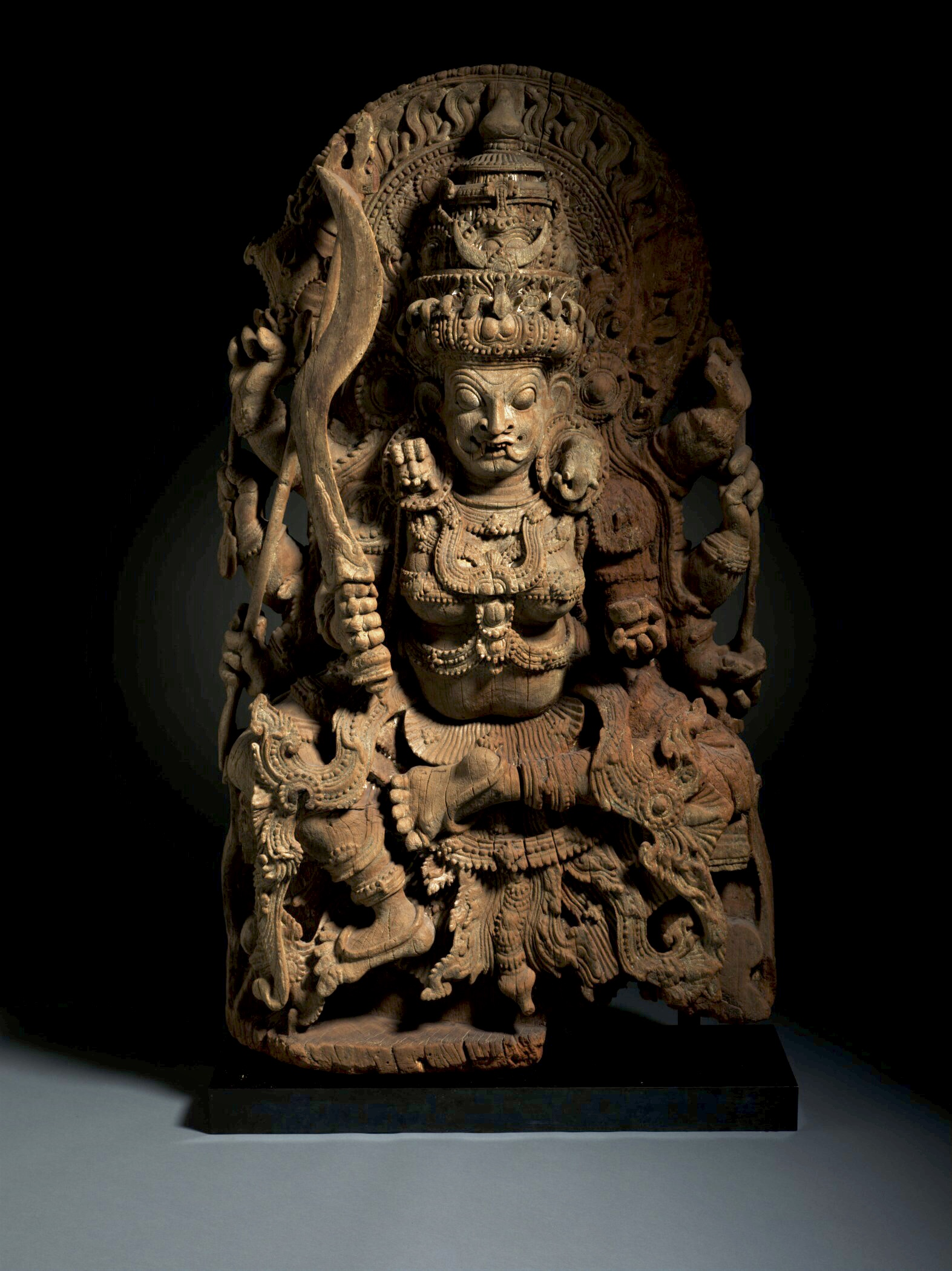
- Bhadra kali

- Thiruvancheri Kavu, Kuthuparamba, Kannur, Kerala

Religion
- Affiliation: Hinduism
- District: Kannur
- Deity: Bhadrakali, Shiva

Location
- Location: Kannur
- State: Kerala
- Country: India
- Interactive map of Thiruvancheri kavu
- Coordinates: 11.83217°N 75.55477°E

Architecture
- Type: Architecture of Kerala
- Completed: Exact date unknown
- Temple: One

Thiruvancheri Kavu is located near Kuthuparamba, Kannur district, Kerala. It is a site of ancient worship where Shakteya rituals are performed. The temple is notable for its integration of Shakta and Shaiva traditions. It is one of the 13 Shakteya temples in Kerala related to Kashmir Shaivism.

The temple was destroyed 200 250 years ago. The Kingdom of Kottayam initiated rebuilding the temple after finding the destroyed remains. The deity is the family goddess of the western branch of the Kingdom of Kottayam. Pazhassi Raja belongs to this family.

== Temple architecture and deities ==
Thiruvanjeri Kavu is designed according to the traditional Kerala temple architecture known as Rurujith Vidhanam. The temple complex houses two sanctum sanctorum where the deities Bhadrakali, Saptha Mathrukkal, Ganapathy, and Virabhadra are enshrined facing the sanctum sanctorum of Shiva. There is a separate sanctum for Kshetrapalaka, revered as Kalabhairava, and believed to be nurtured by Devi.

== Sacred grove or Kavu ==
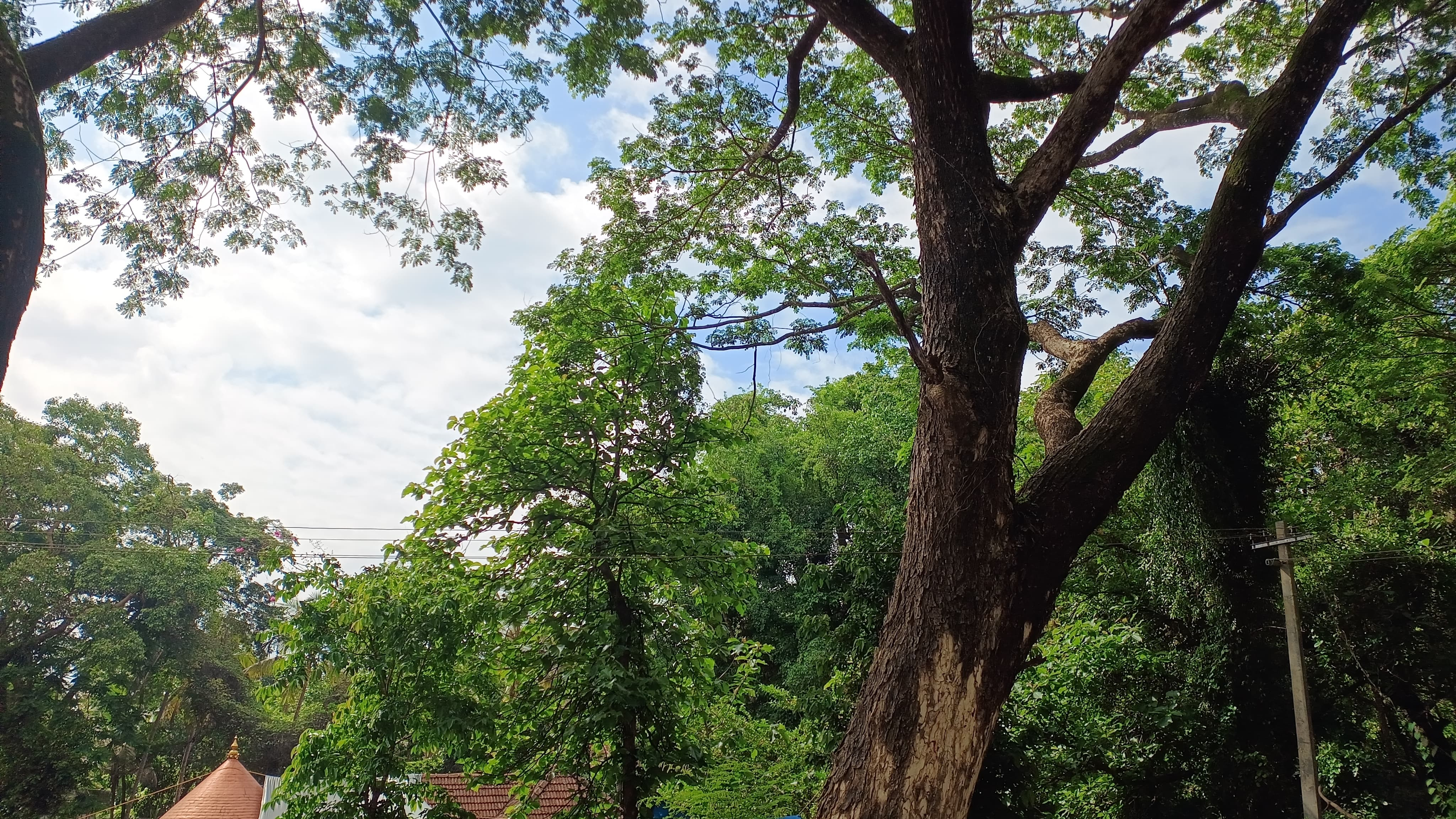

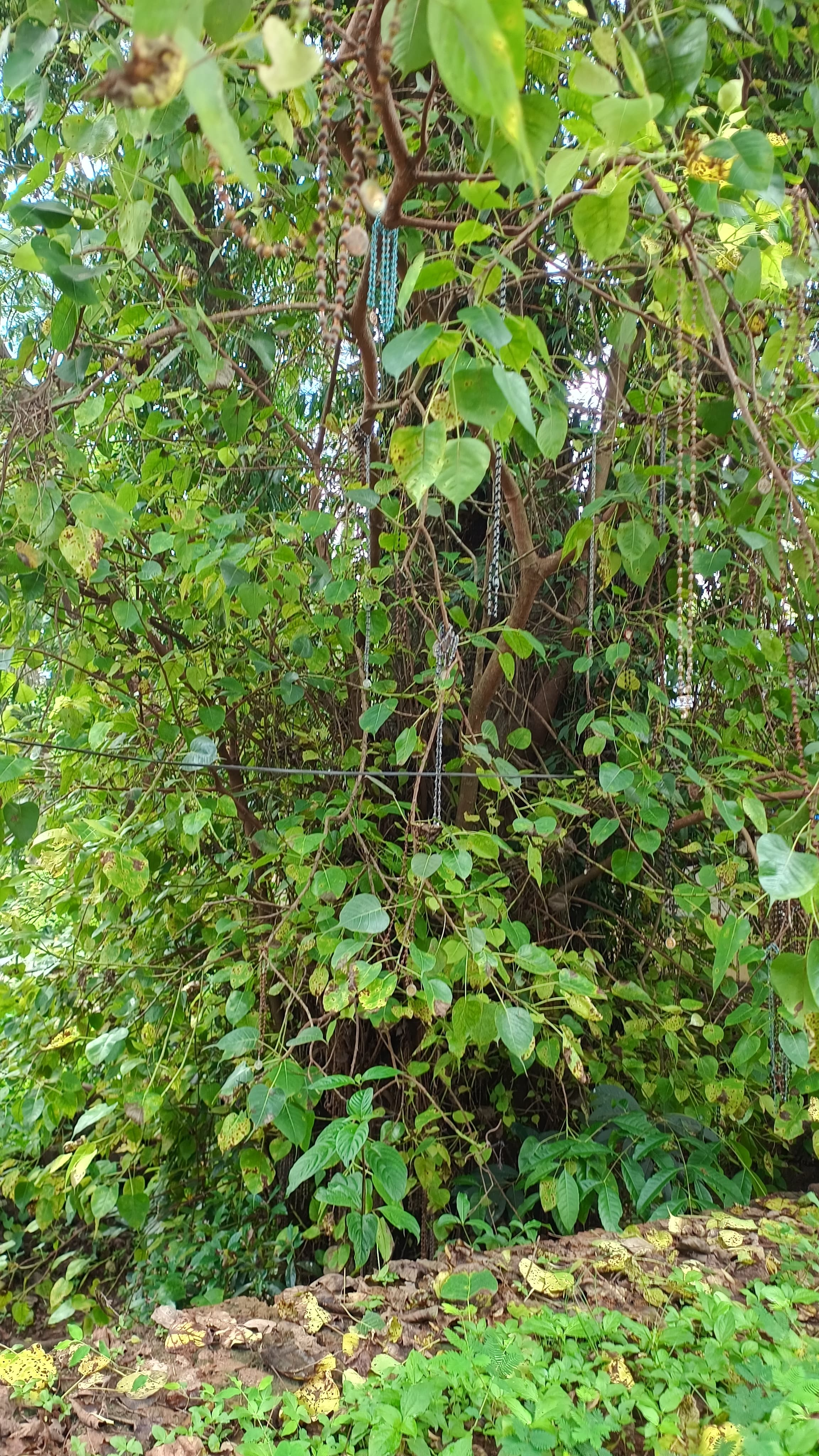

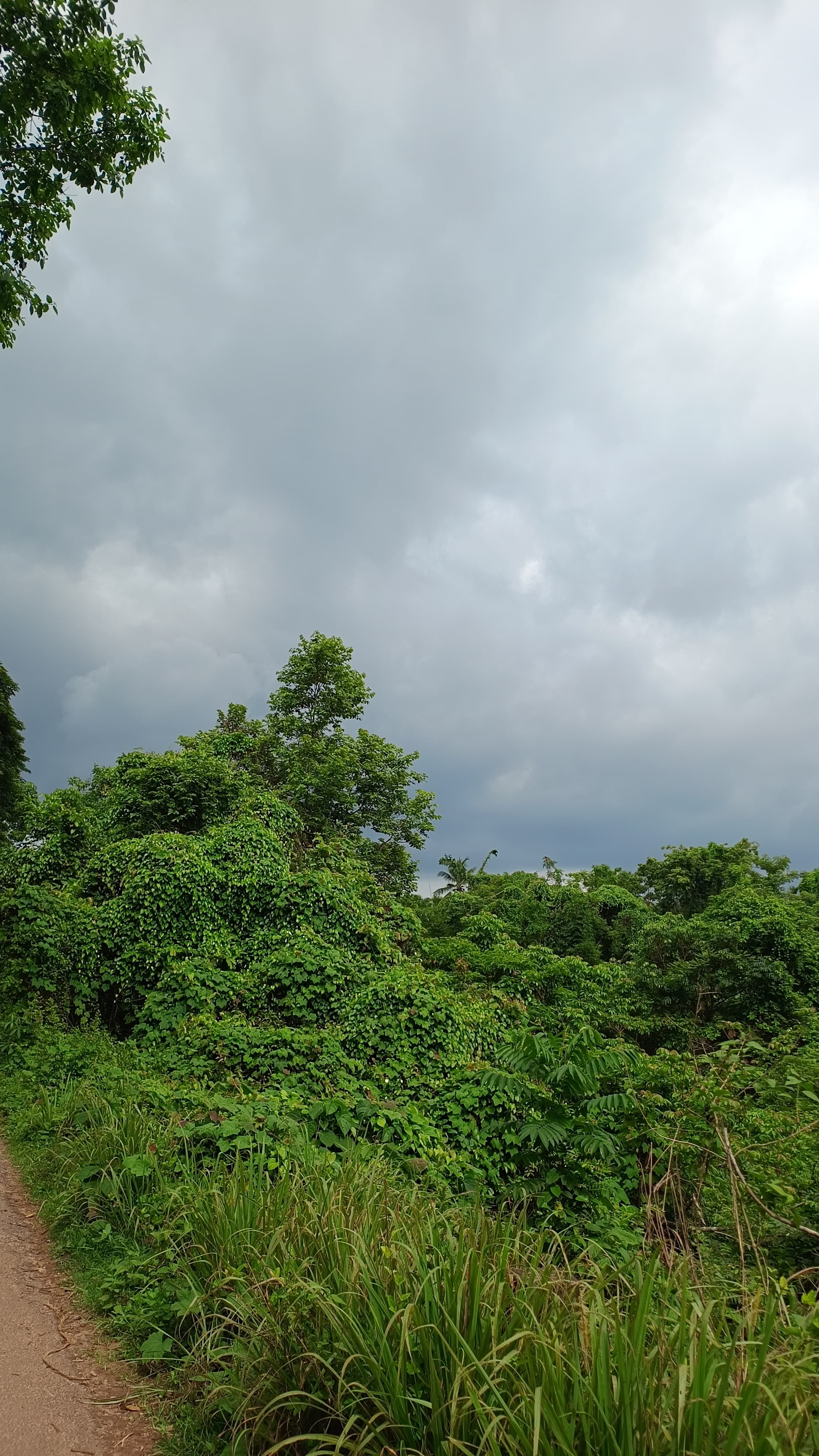

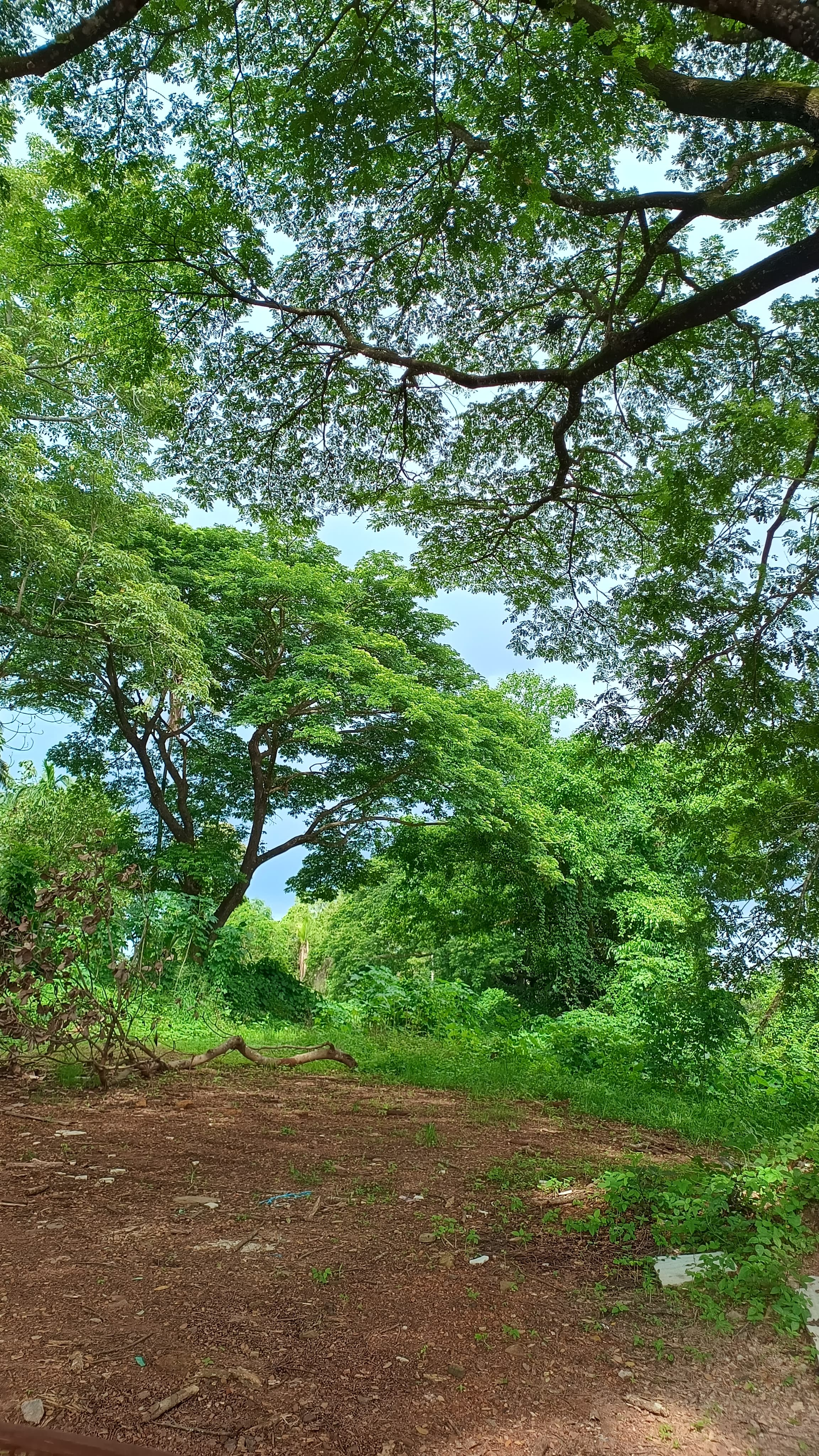

== See also ==
13 Shakteys Temples of Kerala

1. Mannampurath Kavu, Neeleswaram
2. Thiruvarkkattu Kavu or Madaayi Kavu, Pazhayangadi
3. Kalari Vatulkkal Kavu, Valapattanam
4. Mamanikkunnu Kavu, Irikkur
5. Thiruvancheri Kavu, Kuthuparamba
6. Kaliyam Kavu, Vadakara, Edacheri
7. Pishari Kavu, Koyilandi, Kollam(Malabar)
8. Thiruvalayanaadu Kavu, Kozhikode
9. Kodikkunnathu Kavu, Pattambi
10. Thirumandham kunnu Kavu, Angadippuram
11. Kodungallur Kavu, Thrissur
12. Muthoot Kavu, Thiruvalla
13. Panayannar Kavu, Mannar, Thiruvalla
