= Kodungallur Sree Kurumba Bhagavathy Temple =

Hindu temple in Thrissur, Kerala

- കൊടുങ്ങല്ലൂർ ശ്രീ കുരുംബ ഭഗവതി ക്ഷേത്രം
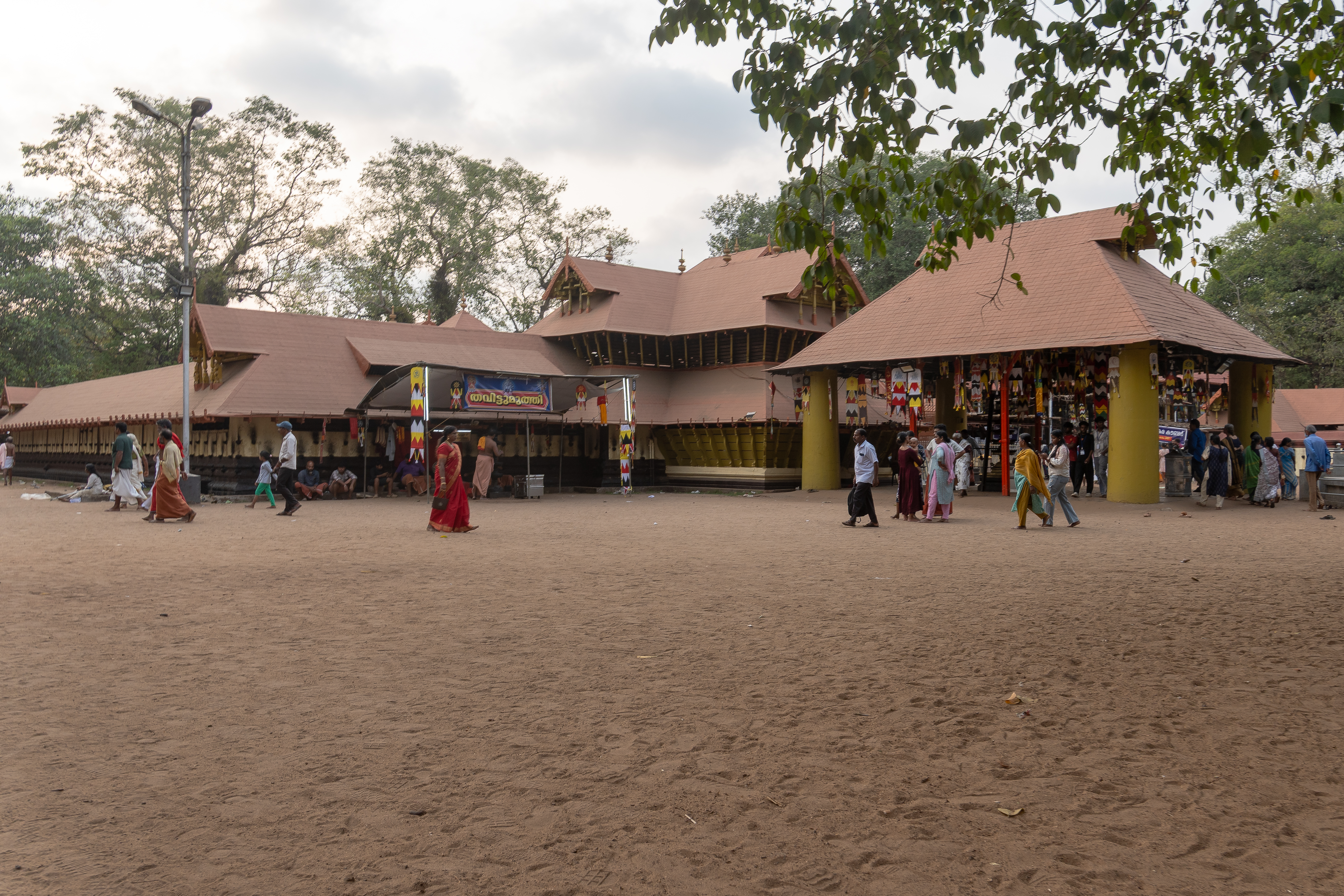
- Kodungallur Sree Kurumba Bhagavati Temple

- Sree Kurumba Bhagavathy Temple, Kodungallur, Thrissur, Kerala Kodungallur Sree Kurumba Bhagavathy Temple (India) Kodungallur Sree Kurumba Bhagavathy Temple (Asia)

Religion
- Affiliation: Hinduism
- District: Thrissur
- Deity: Bhadrakali (Maha Kali, Durga or Aadi Parashakthi, Kannagi)

Location
- Location: Kodungallur
- State: Kerala
- Country: India
- Coordinates: 10.226833°N 76.198425°E

Architecture
- Type: Architecture of Kerala
- Completed: Before CE. Exact date not known

Specifications
- Temple: One
- Elevation: 32.53 m (107 ft)

Website
- kodungallursreekurumbabhagavathytemple.org

Sree Kurumba Bhagavati Temple (alternatively Sree Kurumba Bhagavati Temple) is a Hindu temple at Kodungallur, Thrissur District, Kerala state, India. It is dedicated to the goddess Bhadrakali, a form of Mahakali worshipped and significantly revered in Kerala. The goddess is known also by the names "Sri Kurumba" and Kodungallur Amma (The Mother of Kodungallur). This temple is the head of 64 Bhadrakali kavus in Malabar. This Mahakali temple is one of the oldest functioning temples in India. The goddess of the temple represents the goddess in her fierce ('ugra') form, facing North, featuring eight hands with various attributes. One is holding the head of the demon king Daruka, another a sickle-shaped sword, next an anklet, another a bell, among others.

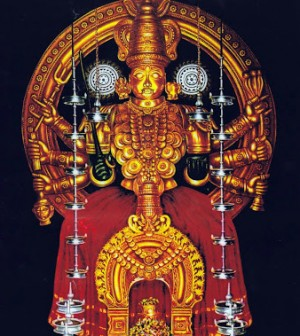
Kodungallur bhagavathy

== History ==
According to legend, after Parasurama created Kerala, a demon named Darikan began tormenting him. Unable to endure this, Parasurama prayed to Lord Shiva for assistance in destroying the demon. Following Lord Shiva's divine instructions, Parasurama constructed a temple and installed the powerful goddess Bhagavathy. It is believed that the deity worshipped there is Parashakti herself. Darikan was ultimately slain by Bhadrakali, who emerged from the three eyes of Lord Shiva. Nairs of the Kodungallur region and various sub-castes of the Nair community had representations in the association.[citation needed]

The members of the association O.K.A.Y were the administrators of the Kodungallur Bhagavathy Temple (now with the Cochin Devaswom Board).[1][2] The meetings of the association used to be held on the first day of every month in front of the Kodungallur Bhagavathy temple (and considered "all matters" pertaining to the subjects who are within their jurisdiction and took appropriate decisions).

Another legend states that the temple dates back to very ancient times and was established for Kannaki during the Sangam period. In remembrance of the Sangam people, Sangam games are conducted at the temple during Thalapoli festival. During the rule of the Kulasekhara dynasty, Kodum Kaliyur served as the capital and was an important part of Thiruvanchikulam. Chera king Senguttuvan, who ruled Kerala from Kodungallur, is believed to have moved Kannaki one furlong south of the present temple site and built a shrine for her. The consecration was carried out through Shakta worship, including the a thousand pots of toddy and sacrifice of thousand chickens. Considering the immense power of the goddess, she was installed at the present temple site along with Lord Shiva facing south, Parashakti facing north, and Bhadrakali facing west. It is believed that Kannaki was installed at Kodungallur about 1,800 years ago. It is believed that Kannagi after coming to Kodungallur seeks both salvation and divine union with the goddess Bhadrakali enshrined inside the sanctum sanctorum. Before coming to Kodungallur, Kannagi gave darshan to the native people in Attukkal, where Attukal Bhagavathy Temple stands. It is believed that the women there pacified the angry goddess by receiving and giving her Pongala, which is celebrated annually as Attukal Pongala.

It is also believed that the Adi Sankaracarya consecrated five chakras that conceives the power of the temple.

The Chicken sacrifice is banned in the temple from 1978 as per the Kerala Animals and Bird Sacrifices Prohibition Act.

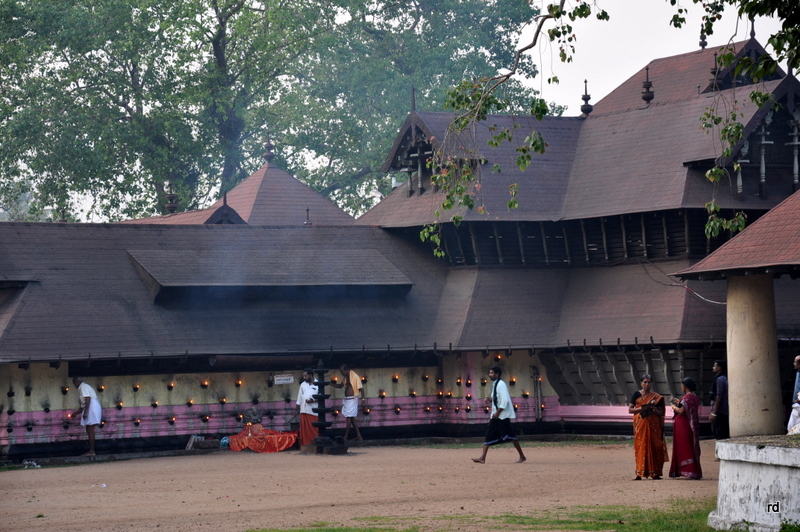
Lighting the evening lamps at Kodungallur Bhagavathy Temple

== Festivals ==
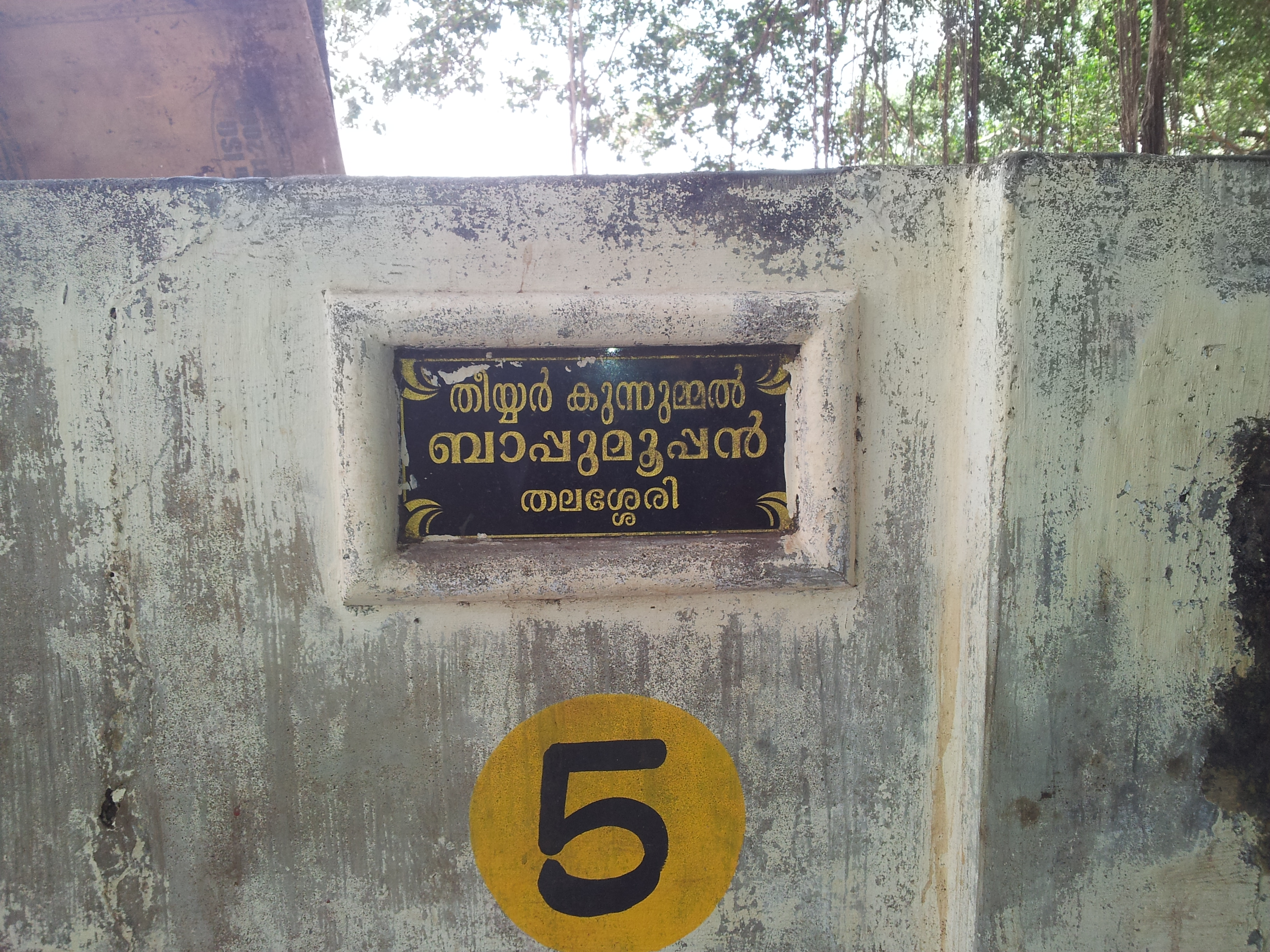
Kodungallur Thiyyar Tara. There are 64 tharas at Kodungallur temple belonging to the 64 Thiyyar tharawads in the Malabar region, primarily from the Kannur and Kozhikode districts.

=== Bharani festival ===
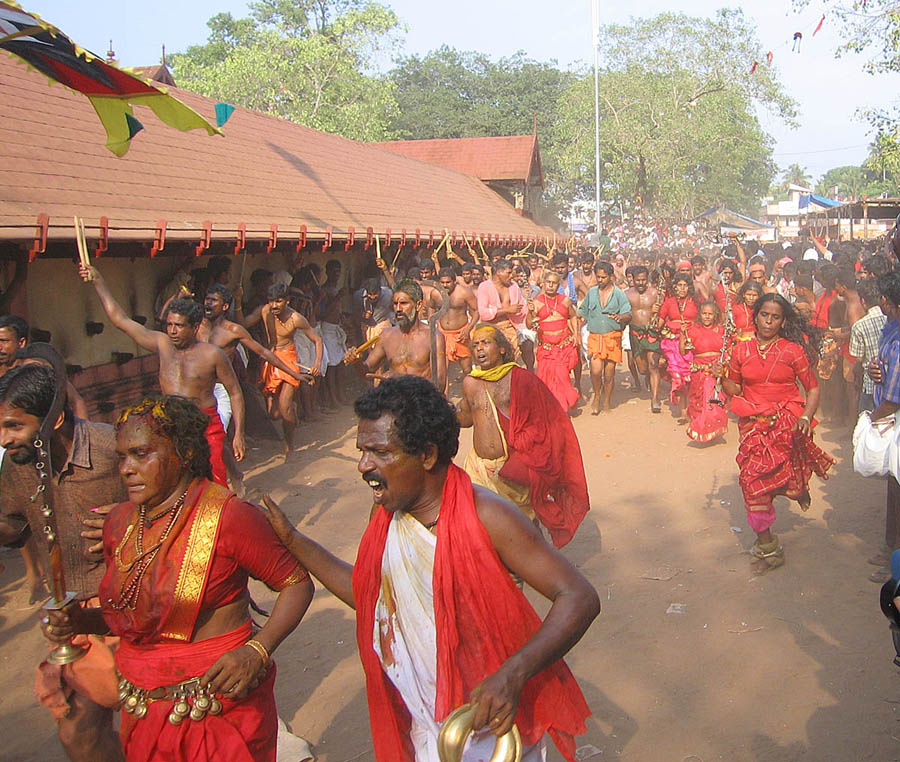
Kodungallur Bharani festival in Kodungallur Bhagavathy Temple

The Bharani festival lasts from the Bharani asterism in Kumbham to seven days after the Bharani asterism in Meenam. The festival begins with Kozhikkallu Modal, a ritual involving the sacrifice of cocks and the shedding of their blood. Another key event is Kavu Theendal, overseen by the King of Kodungallur, features Vellichapads (oracles) running around the temple waving sabres, while their attendants throw objects, including cocks, into the inner quadrangle. The oracles shout bawdy abuse at the goddess, which is believed to be accepted, followed by a purification ceremony the next day.

Chandanapoti Charthal or Thrichandanacharthu pooja is another, involving smearing the image with sandalwood paste.

=== Thalappoli festival ===
The Thalappoli festival is celebrated in the month of Makaram (January–February). The four-day Thalappoli commences from the evening of Makara Sankranthi with religious rituals. It is accompanied by elephanant procession and kathina vedi (barrel crackers). On the first Thalapoli day, the Malayarayan community members reach the temple with Irumudi Kettu. They will be fasting and will offer turmeric, pepper etc. They will also perform special poojas in the temple. The Kudumbi community comes to the temple accompanied by musical instruments. They will perform Savasini Puja at temple. On the third day procession will start from the Pathinettarayalam Kovilakam. On remaining days, Devaswom Board will be organising Thalapoli.

== Administration ==
The temple was managed by Kodungallur Kovilakam , royal family. The temple administration was taken over by the Cochin Devaswom Board in 1950.

== See also ==
- 13 Shakteya Temples of Kerala
1. Mannampurath Kavu, Neeleswaram
2. Madaayi Kavu(Thiruvarkkattu Kavu), Pazhayangadi
3. Kalari Vatulkkal Kavu, Valapattanam
4. Mamanikkunnu Kavu, Irikkur
5. Thiruvancheri Kavu, Kuthuparamba
6. Kaliyam Kavu, Vadakara, Edacheri
7. Pishari Kavu, Koyilandi, Kollam(Malabar)
8. Thiruvalayanaadu Kavu, Kozhikode
9. Kodikkunnathu Kavu, Pattambi
10. Thirumandham kunnu Kavu, Angadippuram
11. Kodungallur Kavu
12. Muthoot Kavu, Thiruvalla
13. Panayannar Kavu, Mannar, Thiruvalla
- Kannaki Amman
- Shaktism
- Onnu Kure Áyiram Yogam
- 108 Shiva Temples
- Temples of Kerala
