= Velichappadu =

Mediator between a deity and devotees at a Hindu temple

A velichappadu (Malayalam: വെളിച്ചപ്പാട്, 'Revealer of Light') is the oracle or mediator between a deity and devotees at a Hindu temple in Kerala. Prominent in Valluvanad, the velichappadu, also known as komaram in some parts, is an integral part of the rituals in a Bhagavathi temple. There are both male and female velichappadu and often belong to a particular family. People, in Kerala and beyond, have enormous respect for these mediating oracles when they are in their trances and heed to their words.

== Appearance ==
As followers of Goddess Bhadrakali (Kannagi), velichapadu are seen dressed in red, body smeared with turmeric powder and adorned with heavy ritual ornaments and garlands. A heavy hooked sword or sickle-shaped sword, chilambu (anklet), and aramani (huge and heavy waist belt studded with bells) are a part of the ensemble. Often, as their identity, a velichapadu grows long hair, which hangs loose on their forehead and back.

== Performance ==
The velichapadu makes their customary appearance in the temple after performing a puja. Here they perform a frantic dance called thullal, usually accompanied by beatings of drums and cymbals, and gets into a trance with the spirit of the presiding deity. The deity is believed to speak through him as the velichapadu dances, delivering the frenzied forecasts. They may also predict solutions to problems put forward by devotees and hence the name which also translates as 'the one who sheds light (on problems)'. Their counsel, often delivered in incomprehensible words and abrupt gestures, is translated to the devotees by an assistant. During the thullal, a velichapadu may also cut his forehead with his sword offering his blood to the deity as a symbol of unshakable faith.

== Kodungalloor Bharani ==
Velichappadus from across the state flock to the annual Kodungalloor Bharani event performing the frenzied dance, thullal, around the temple and singing Bharani Paattu.

== In popular culture ==
=== Kakkarissi Natakam ===
Kakkarissi Natakam is a satirical dance-drama based on the puranic legends of Lord Siva and his consort Parvati when they assumed human forms as Kakkalan and Kakkathi – a nomadic tribe of fortune tellers. The legend only serves as a skeletal framework for the play, which often turns into a subtle critique of contemporary society. The language is a blend of Tamil and Malayalam. The chief characters are Kakkalan, Kakkathi, Vetan, Velichappadu, Thampuraan and the ubiquitous Jester. The Dholak, Ganchira, Chenda and the Harmonium provide the background score.
