= Kalarivathukkal Temple =

Hindu temple in Kerala, India

Kalarivathukkal Bhagavathy Temple
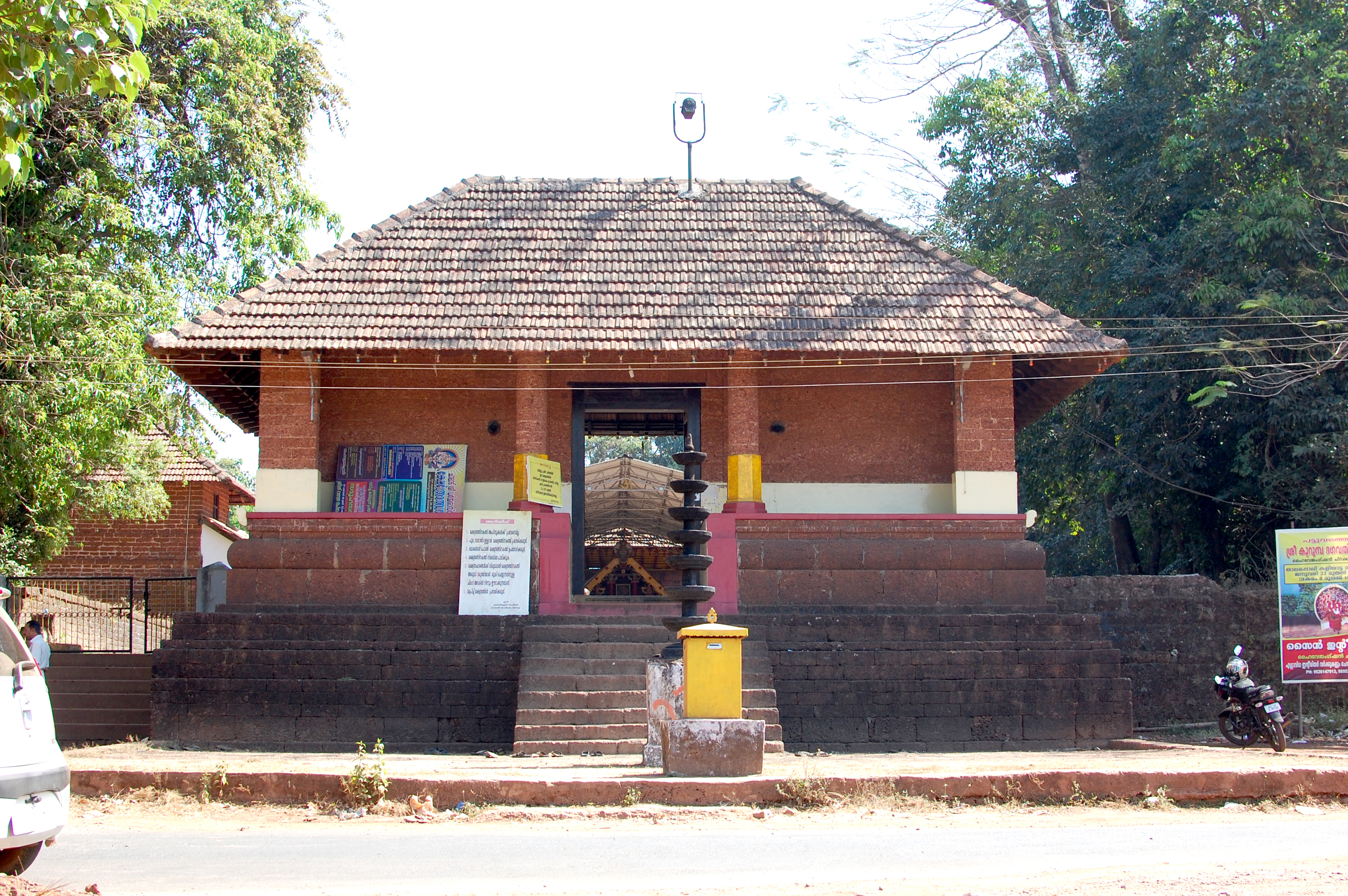
- Kalarivathukkal Bhagavathy Kshetram

- Location within Kerala

Religion
- Affiliation: Hinduism
- District: Kannur
- Deity: Bhadrakali
- Festivals: Pooram, Kalasham
- Governing body: Malabar Devaswom Board

Location
- Location: Chirakkal, Valapattanam
- State: Kerala
- Country: India
- Coordinates: 11°55′28.67″N 75°21′10.95″E

Architecture
- Type: Traditional Kerala style
- Creator: Parashurama, Chirakkal Kingdom
- Temple: 4 Sanctums

Kalarivathukkal Bhagavathy Temple, Bhadrakali Shrine located near Valapattanam river. The deity of the shrine is the fierce form of Bhadrakali. Kalarivathukkal Bhagavathy is considered as the mother of the ancient martial art Kalarippayattu and hence the name. The shrine is administered by Malabar Devaswom Board and classified as Category A Temple of the board. Kalarivathukkal has come from the word Kalari Vaatilkal.

== Legend ==
The holy shrine is one of the Devi temple triads of the erstwhile Chirakkal Kingdom. The other two being Cherukunnu Annapoornashwari Temple and Tiruvarkadu Bhagavathy Temple(Madayi kavu). The mythology says that Annapoornashwari came from Kasi to Chirakkal in a boat along with Kalarivatukkalamma and Madayikkavilamma who were her mates; to see the Krishna Temple and never returned.

The Kolathiris relocated their capital from Ezhimala to Chirakkal near Valapattanam river . They were in recorded history known as the descendents of Mooshika kings. (Mooshika in Kannur District and Ay in Thiruvananthapuram District were the two oldest and most prestigious lineages of the Velir clan, and had innumerable intermarriages with the Cheras, Pandyas, Cholas and Pallavas, over the millennia. The Ay dynasty and Mooshaka dynasty had several mutual adoptions over the centuries with the latter adopting from the former first in the 11th Century CE.

The temple was once owned by Vadakke illam and was acquired by Chirakkal Kovilakom.

== Temple Architecture ==
The temple is in traditional Kerala architecture style. The temple design is Rurujith Vidhanam(Kaula Shakteya Sampradaya) where in there are shrines of Shiva, Sapta Mathrukkal, Ganapathy, Veerabhadra and Kshetrapalakan(Bhairava) in 4 sanctums. The main deity is facing west. The shrine of Shiva is facing East, Shrine of Sapta Mathrukkal (Maathrushaala) facing North and the Shrine of Kshetrapalaka (Bhairava) facing East. The Maathrushaala has idols of SapthaMathrukkal (Brahmani, Vaishnavi, Shankari, Kaumari, Varahi, Chamundi, Indrani), Veerabhadra and Ganapathi. Every morning after the rites the Sacred Sword is taken to the Mandapam adjacent to the Maathrushaala and taken back in the evening after the rites. The main idol is made of KaduSarkaraYogam so for performing rites and rituals a Archana bimbam of Devi is used for rites and ablutions. The temple is opened throughout the year, in morning there will be Usha Pooja, at noon Pantheeradi Pooja and in evening Shakti Pooja

== Theyyam ==
Theyyam is a religious ritualistic art-form conducted in Temples and Kavu in North Malabar. The shrine being the family deity of Kolathiri conducts the last Theyyam commencing the Theyyam period of a year. The huge Thirumudi of Kalarivathukkal Amma's theyyam is one of the attractions of the festival.

== Festivals ==
There are two major festivals are there in the shrine. Pooram festival in March–April for 9 days; starts in Karthika nakshatra and ends in Uthram nakshatra of the Malayalam Calendar month of Meenam. On the 7th day the idol is taken to Shri Siveshwaram Temple on 8th to Kadalai Shri Krishna Temple and on 9th it is taken back along with fireworks. The festival commences by the Kalarippayattu performance. Musical and traditional art performances such as Thayambaka, Poorakkali are performed. In June another festival Kalasham concludes the Theyyam period of a year. The other festivals are Navaratri, Shivarathri, Vishuvilakku, Perum kaliyattam in 10th Idavam and Niraputhari in karkkidakam.

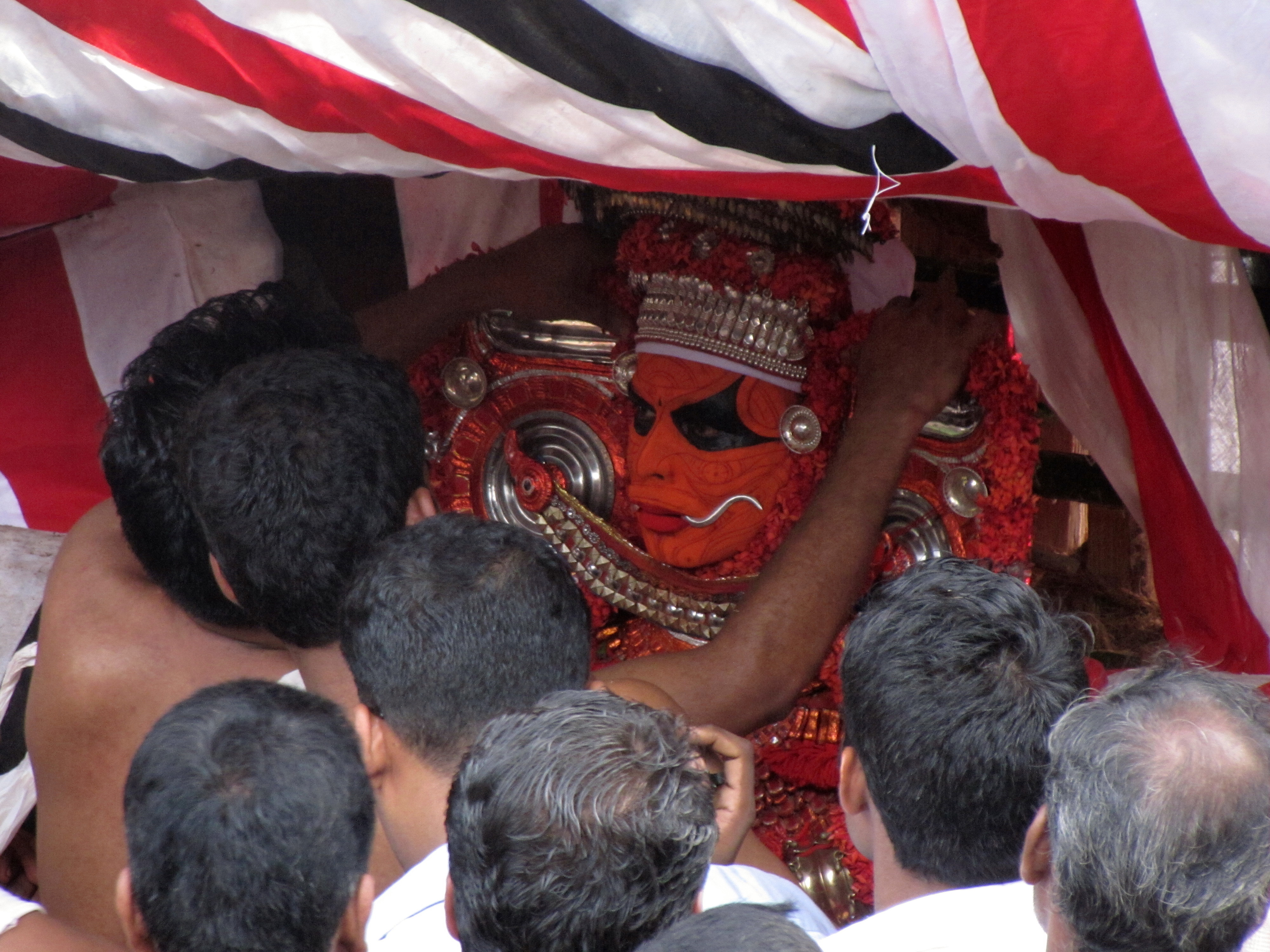
Kalarivaatukkal Amma

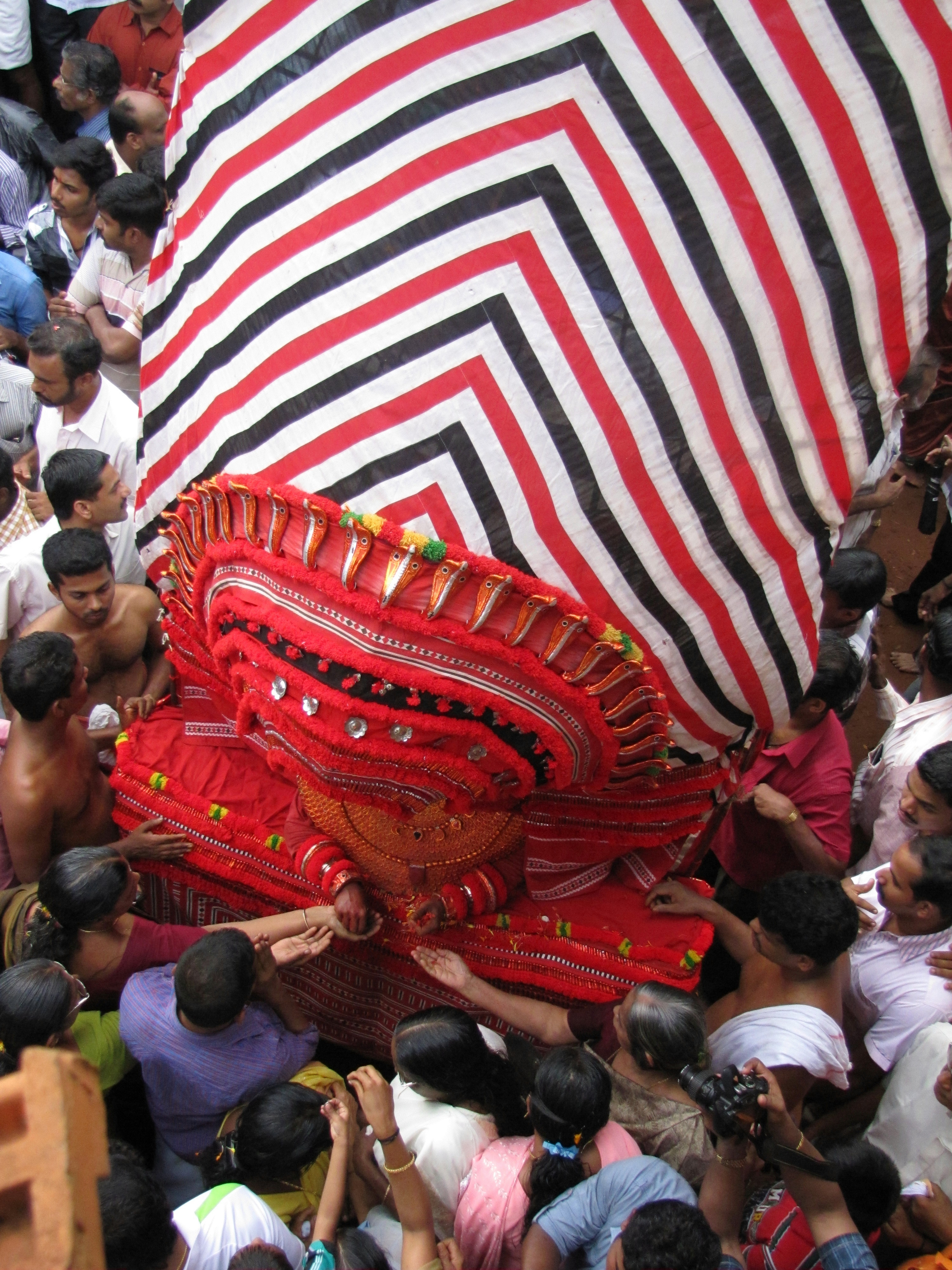
The Theyyam of Kalarivaatukkal Bhagavathy blessing devotees

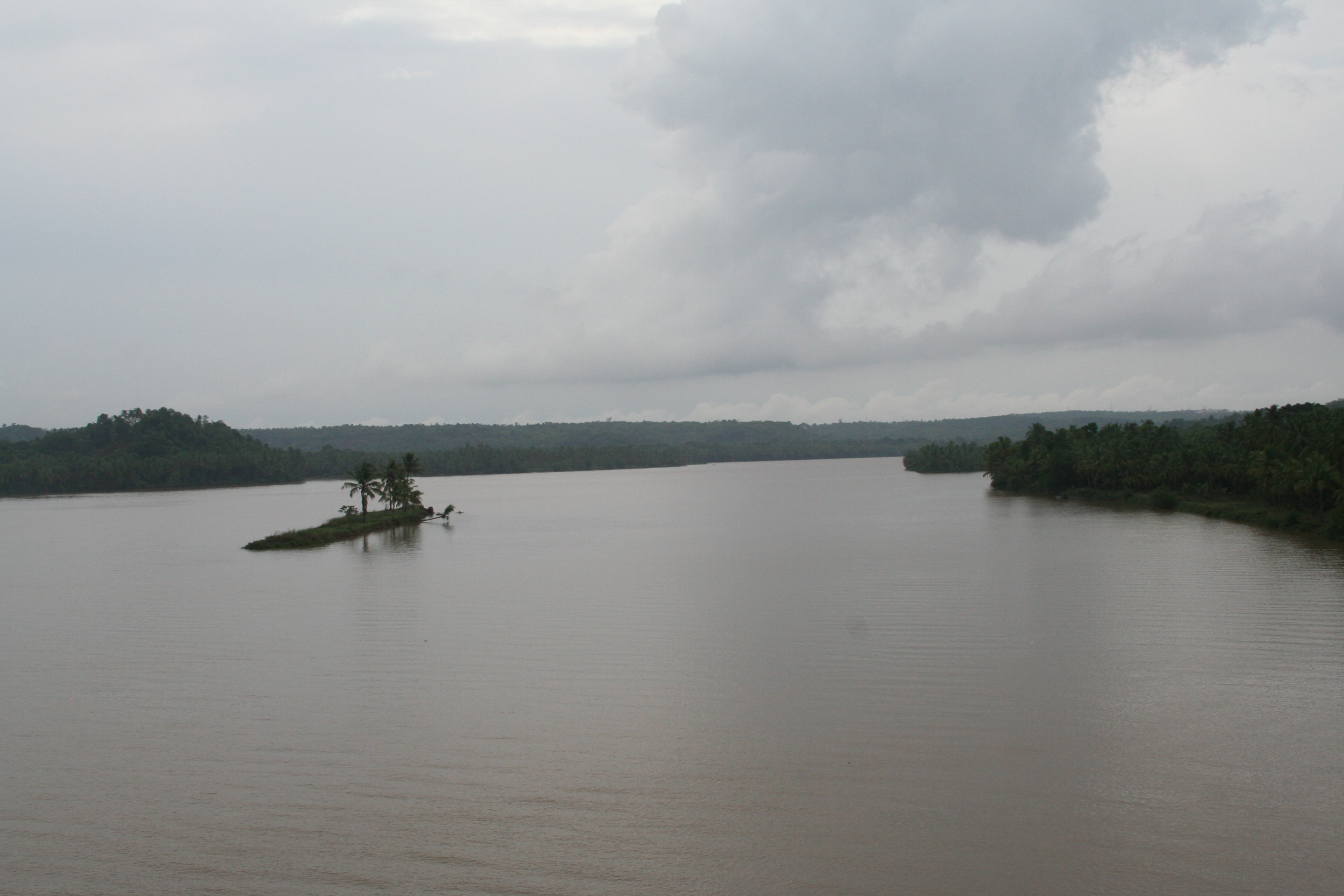
Valapattnam river flowing near the Temple

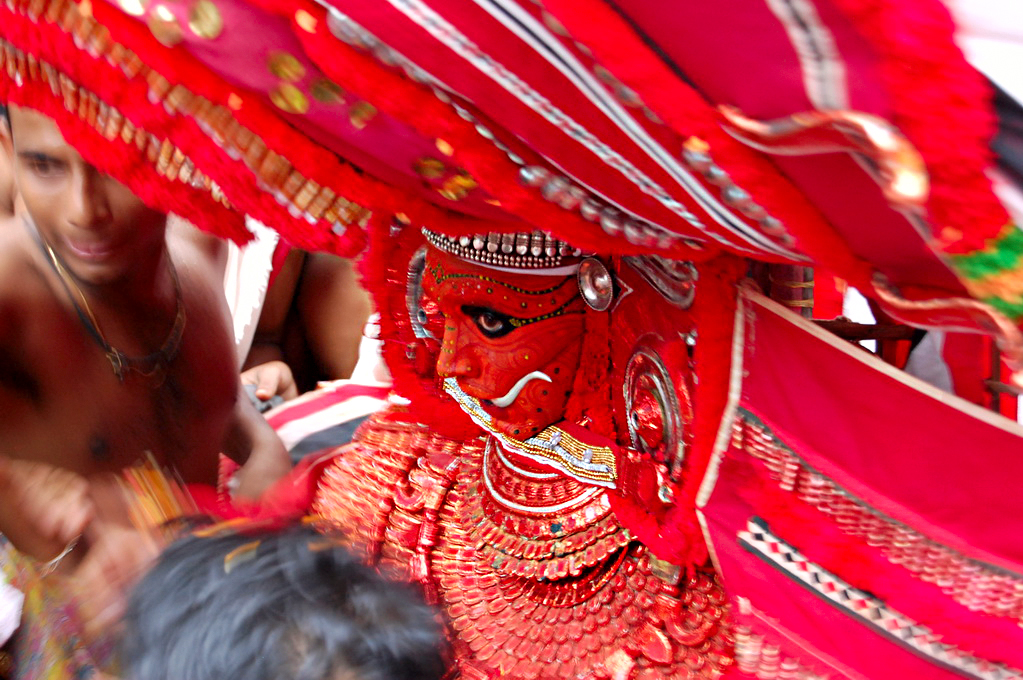

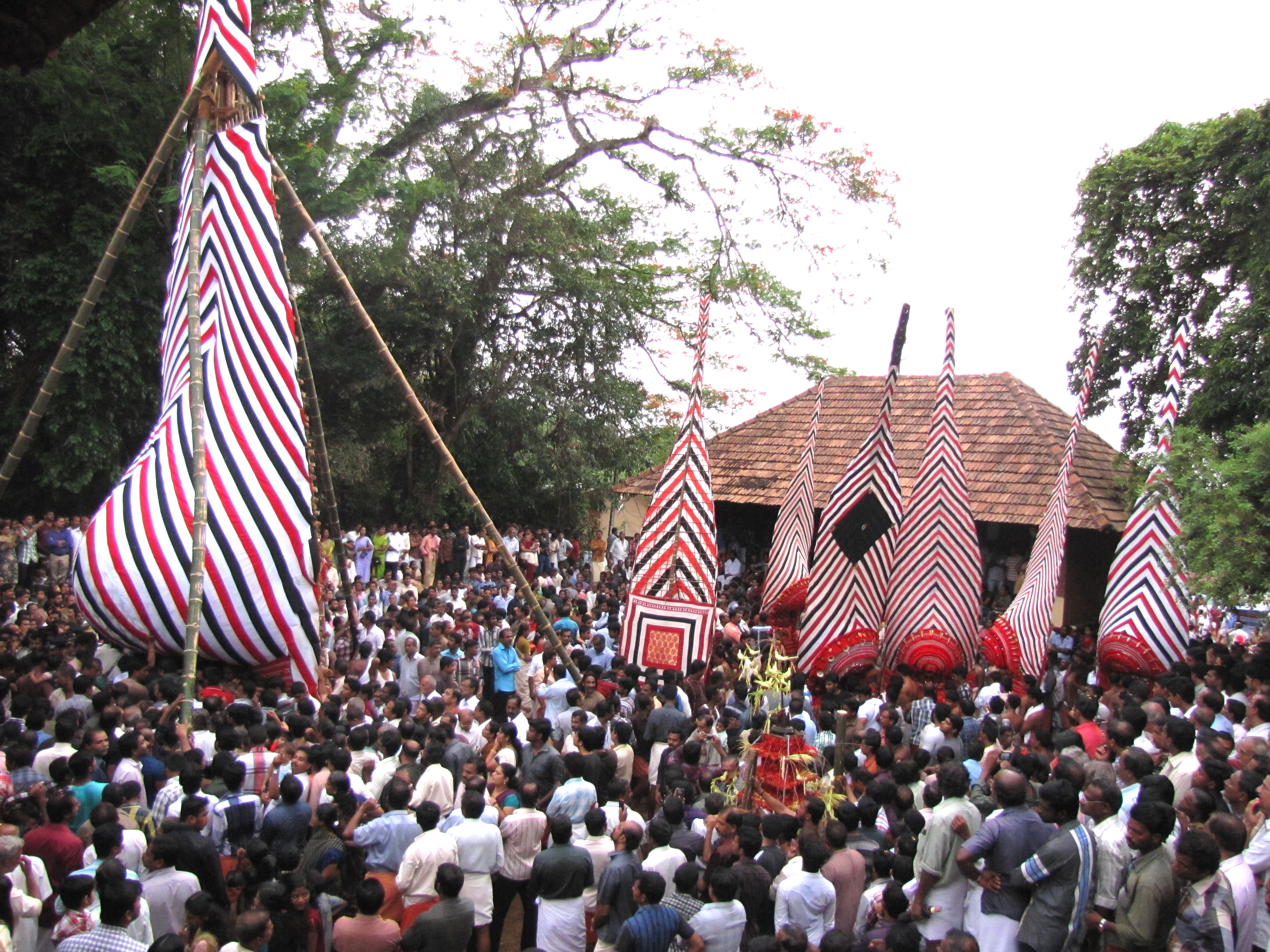

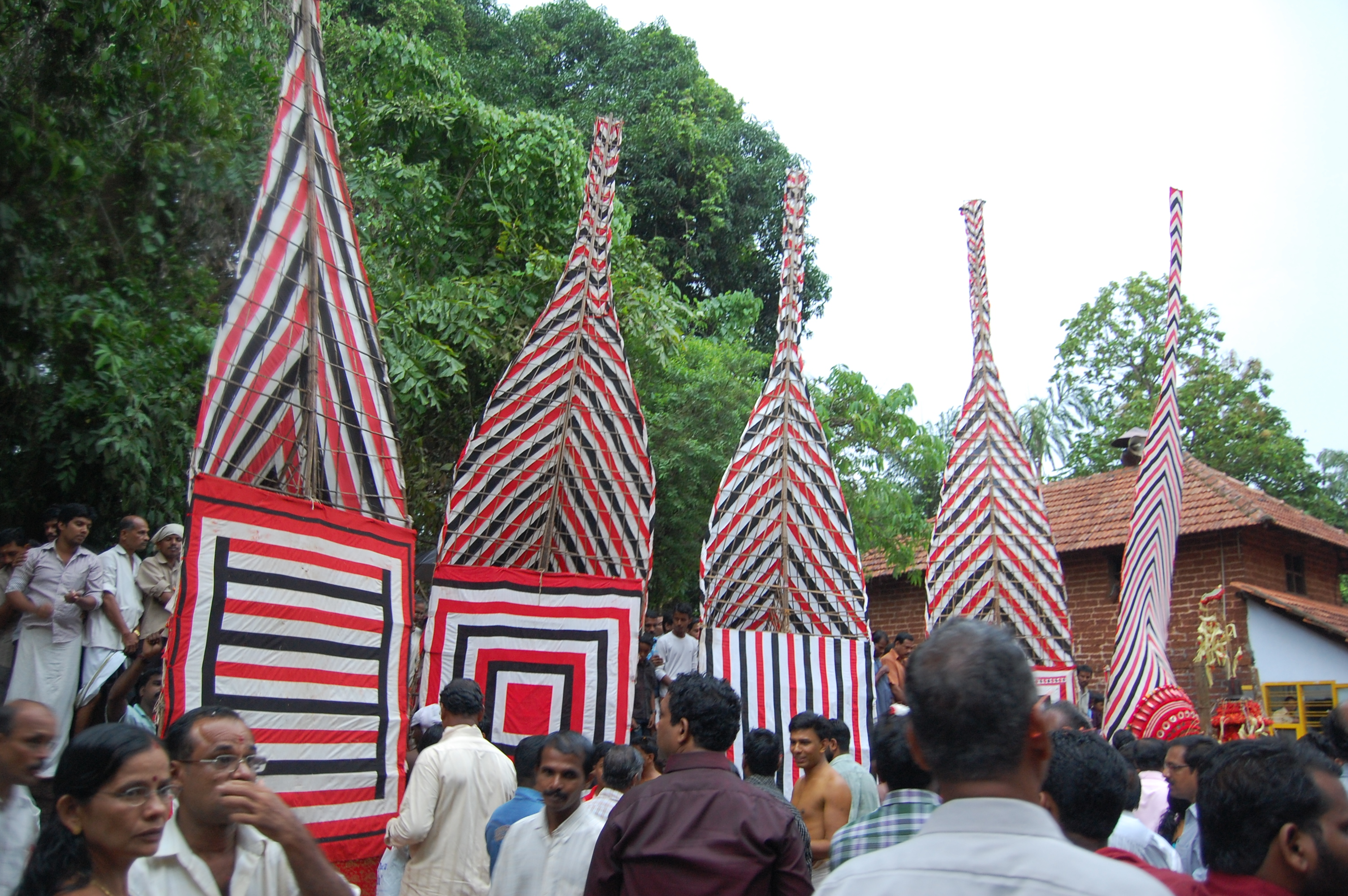

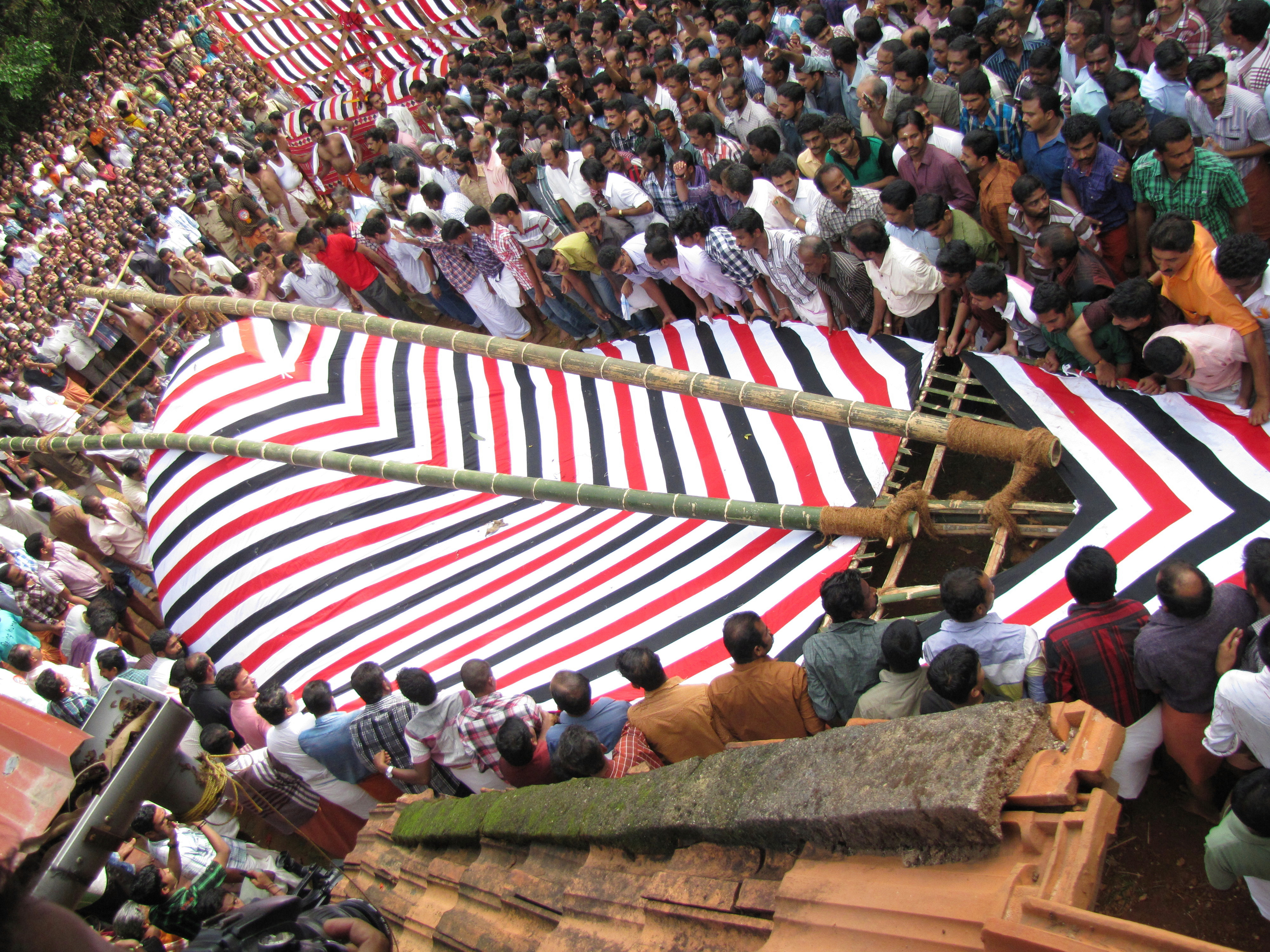

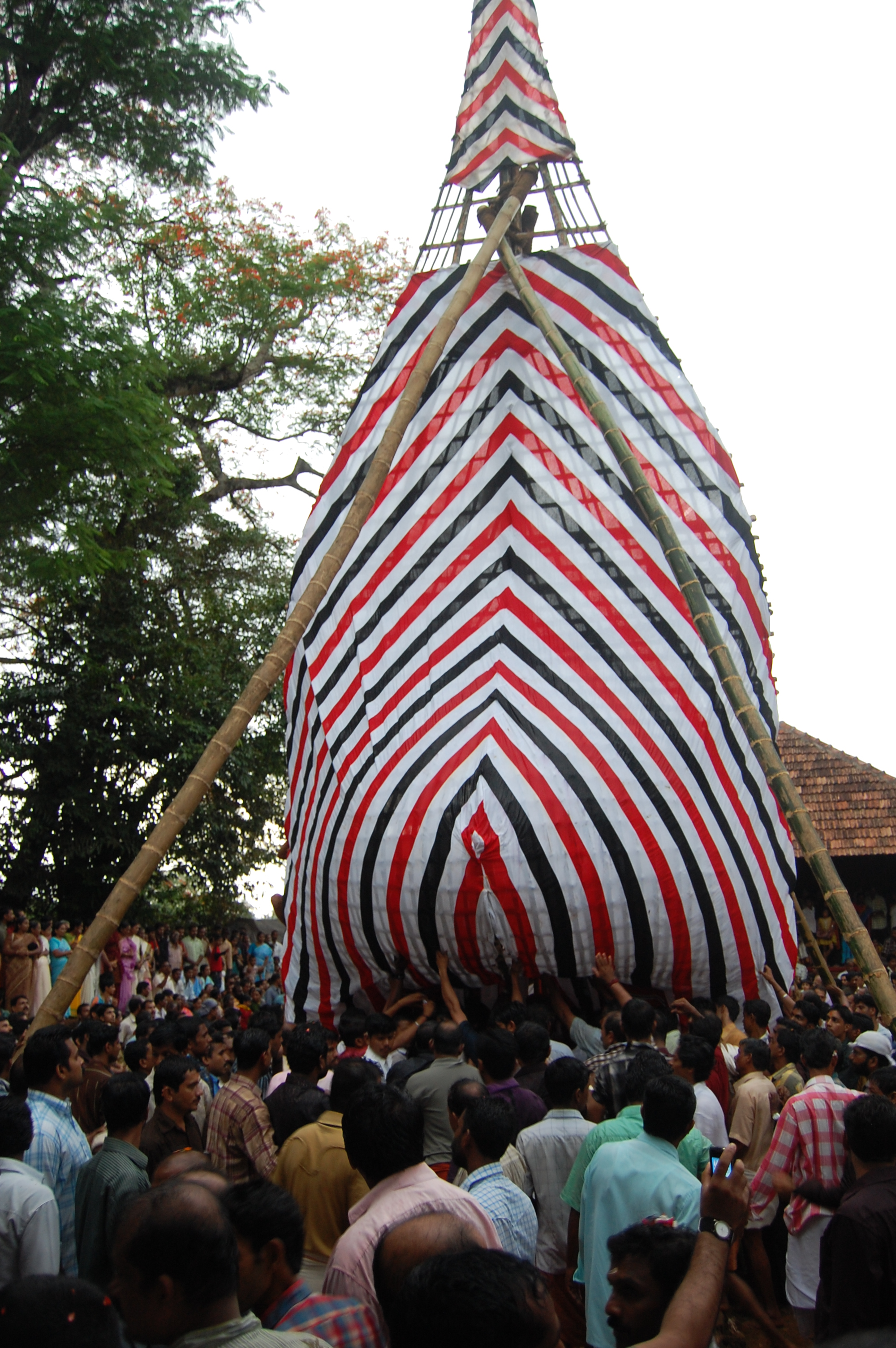

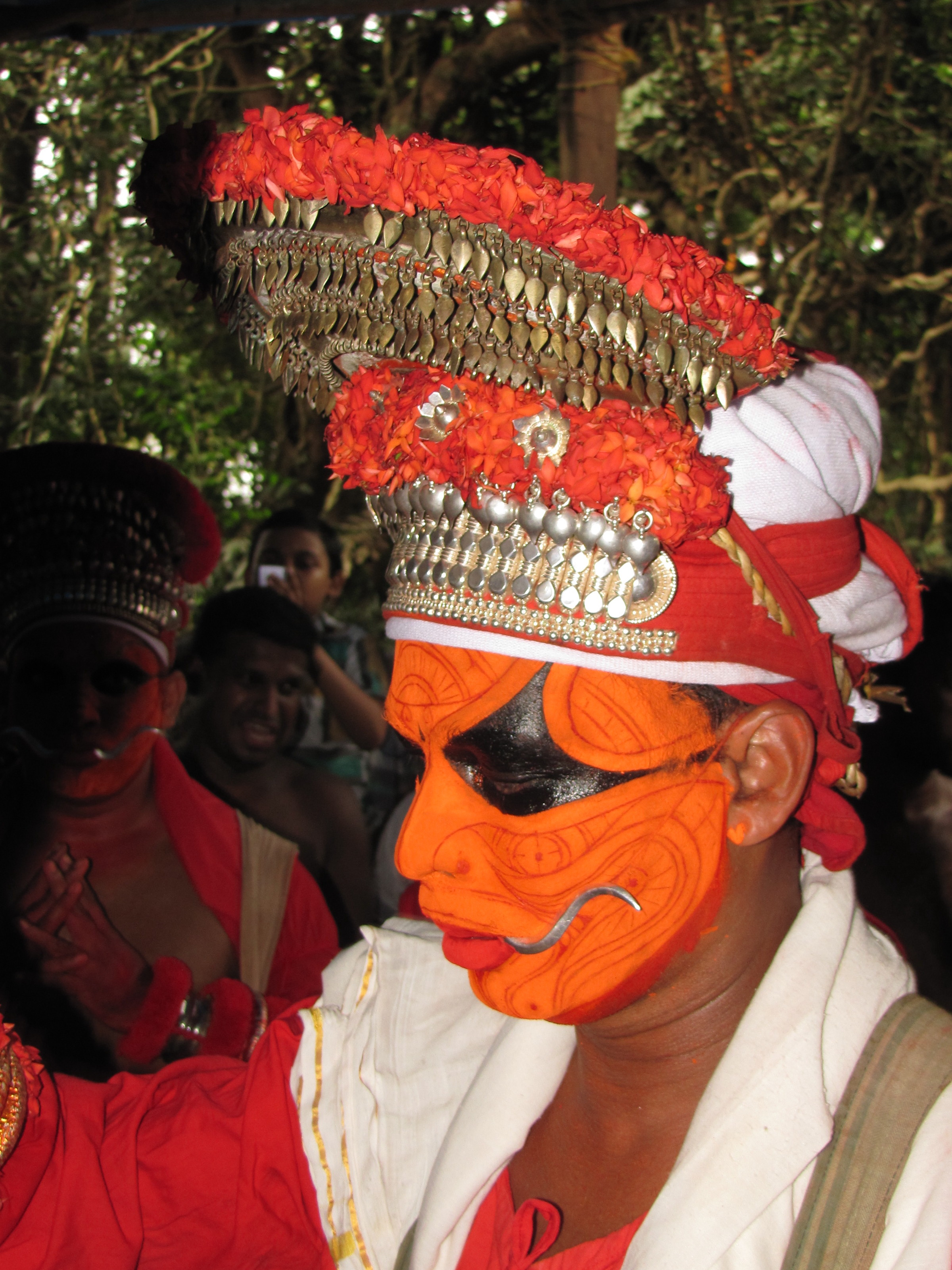

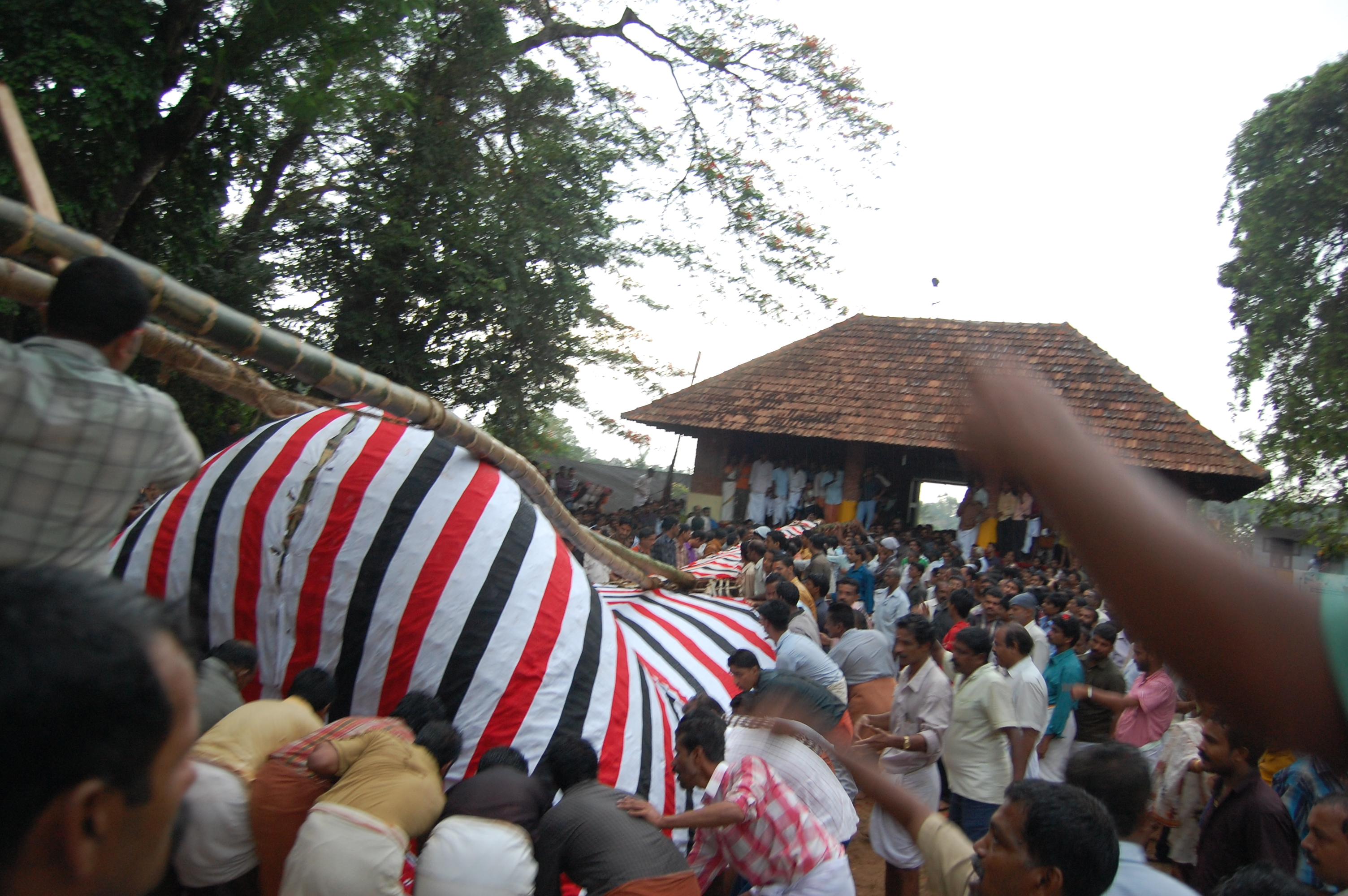

== See also ==
- Rajarajeshwara Temple
- Annapurneshwari Temple

13 Shakteya Temples of Kerala

1. Mannampurath Kavu, Neeleswaram
2. Thiruvarkkattu Kavu or Madaayi Kavu, Pazhayangadi
3. Kalari Vatulkkal Kavu, Valapattanam
4. Mamanikkunnu Kavu, Irikkur
5. Thiruvancheri Kavu, Kuthuparamba
6. Kaliyam Kavu, Vadakara, Edacheri
7. Pishari Kavu, Koyilandi, Kollam(Malabar)
8. Thiruvalayanaadu Kavu, Kozhikode
9. Kodikkunnathu Kavu, Pattambi
10. Thirumandham kunnu Kavu, Angadippuram
11. Kodungallur Kavu, Thrissur
12. Muthoot Kavu, Thiruvalla
13. Panayannar Kavu, Mannar, Thiruvalla
