= Thirumandhamkunnu Temple =

Hindu temple in Kerala, India

Thirumandhamkunnu Sree Bhagavathy Temple
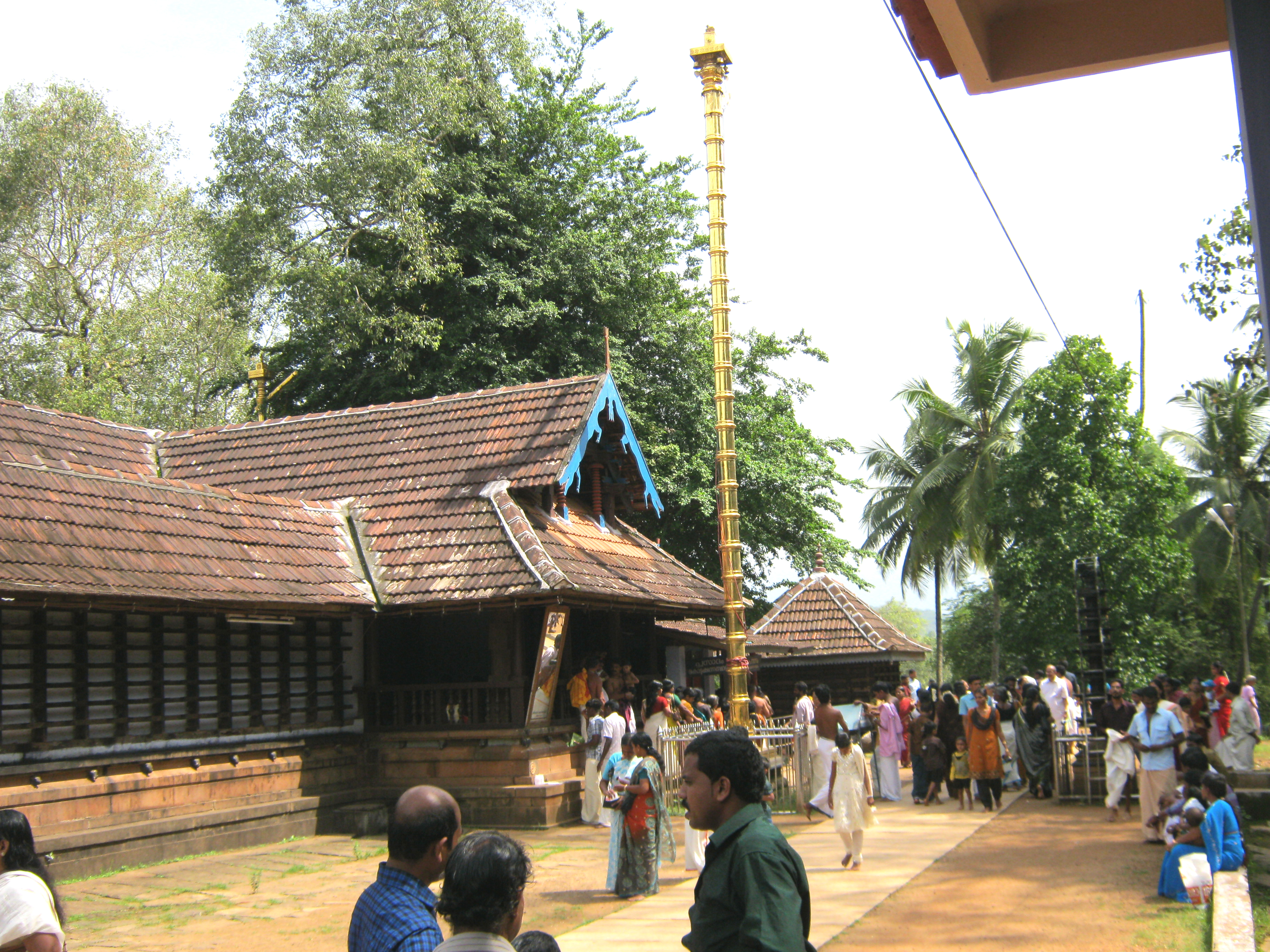
- ശ്രീ തിരുമാന്ധാംകുന്ന് ഭഗവതി ക്ഷേത്രം

- Thirumandhamkunnu Sree Bhagavathy Temple, Angadipuram, Malappuram, Kerala

Religion
- Affiliation: Hinduism
- District: Malappuram
- Deity: Bhadrakali (Sree Parvathy/ Durga/ Maha Kali)
- Festival: 11 day Pooram in March–April

Location
- Location: Angadipuram, Perinthalmanna
- State: Kerala
- Country: India
- Coordinates: 10°58′49″N 76°12′06″E

Specifications
- Temple: One
- Elevation: 66.45 m (218 ft)

Thirumandhamkunnu Temple is a historically significant Hindu temple in Angadipuram, which was the capital of Valluvanad Rajavamsham, in Malappuram district, Kerala state, South India. The temple deity, Thirumandhamkunnil amma, was the paradevatha (official goddess) of the kings of Valluvanad, the local feudal kings ruled the area in the Middle Ages. The warriors (called Chavers, literally "martyrs") of Valluvanad king set out from this temple to Thirunavaya, to participate in the famous Mamankam festival. A memorial structure called the chaver thara ("platform of the martyrs") can be found in front of the main entrance of the Thirumanthamkunnu Temple.

The temple is also an important pilgrim center, especially for the eleven-day-long annual festival celebrated in March and April months of the Gregorian calendar. The "principal deity" of temple is Lord Shiva. But the famous deity is Sree Bhadrakali or Sree Parvathy, locally known as Thirumandhamkunnilamma and Ganesha, for whom the famous marriage oblation (Mangalya Puja) is performed. Devotees believe Mangalya puja will remove obstacles for one's marriage. Thirumandhamkunnilamma is considered the Supreme Mother, Shakthi Devi in Hinduism. Bhadrakali believed to be born from the third eye of lord Shiva to kill the demon king Daruka. Bhadra means good and Kali means goddess of time. Bhadrakali is worshiped for prosperity and salvation. Devi is considered as the creator, protector, destroyer, nature & kundalini. Mangalya Puja, Rigveda Laksharchana, Chandattam and Kalampattu are the important religious offerings of the Thirumanthamkunnu Temple.

There are ceremonies and rituals specific to this Hindu temple that are not carried out at others. The Thirumanthamkunnu Temple courtyards are on a hilltop that provides a view of the countryside spread out below.

== Legend surrounding Thirumanthamkunnu Temple ==
King Mandhata of Surya dynasty ruled his kingdom for a long period. He then gave away the kingdom to his successors and chose to meditate on supreme god Shiva and attain the Shiva's feet at the end. Shiva was pleased with his penance appeared before the king Mandhata and offered him any boon at Mount Kailash. The king prayed to the lord for an idol to worship till his death. Shiva gave him the most holy Shiva Lingam which was too dear to him and which used to be worshipped by Parvati and then the god disappeared.

Carrying the Shiva Lingam on head, King Mandhata started his downward journey from Mount Kailash and reached the hill now known as "Thirumandhamkunnu" in Kerala. A spring with crystal-clear water flowed along the northern slope of the hill. Many beautiful birds chirped in the jungle. Wild animals like lion, tiger, and elephant roamed about in the wilderness in full harmony forgetting their traditional enmity. Different kinds of trees and plants grew in the region and gave out sweet smell into the atmosphere. The surrounding attracted the king. Feelings of idol on his head heavy he placed it on the ground at immediately the Shiva Lingam got stuck into the earth.

Shiva had gifted the Shiva Lingam to the king when his consort Parvati was away for her bath. When Parvati turned up for worship the Shiva Lingam was not there. She got upset on enquiry she know that it was presented to the King Mandhata, by her husband. Being too much attached to it she wanted the Shiva Lingam back. Shiva told her that he had no objection in her trying to get it back. Parvati now offered Bhadrakali and a host of bhootha to rush up and get back the Shiva Lingam from the King. With the army of bhootha, Bhadrakali reached the northern slope of Thirumandha hill. The brightness emitted by the Shiva Lingam installed by king Mandhata was so great that it dazzled the eyes of Bhadrakali and the bhoothas and they were unable to move up the hills. So they started throwing up the weapons from the foot of the hill. The ascetic attending on Mandhata were unarmed but tried to defend themselves with whatever things they had. These being insufficient to protect them they plucked Attanga nuts from their creeper plants, which were available in plenty and threw them at the enemy. Because of the power of Shiva and the divine power of Mandhata the nuts got changed into arrows instantly. Bhadrakali and her army of bhootha could not resist them the fight lasted for fifteen days.

The age-old custom of "Attangayeru" on first of Thulam (the Malayalam month) on the new moon day of the same month in the forenoon before pantheerady pooja refers to the legendary fight between mandhatha and kali.

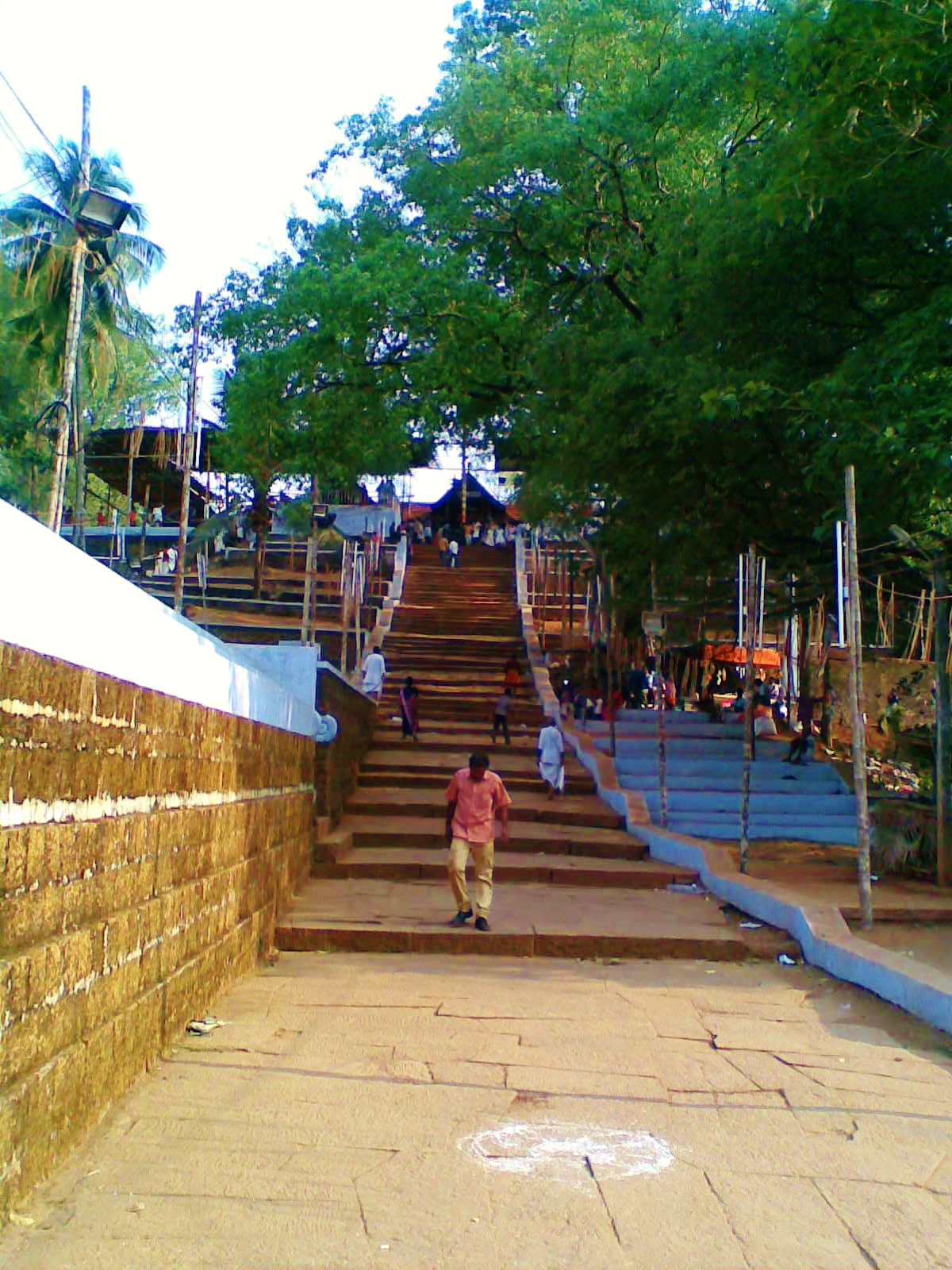
Thirumanthamkunnu Bhagavathi Temple, North nada

Expecting defeat Mahamaya took her viswaroopa. She had an elephant in one ear and a lion in the other as earrings. Seeing this form the ascetics fell down senseless. When mahamaya in this form reached the hilltop Mandhatha was also helpless. He embraced the sivalinga, kali tried to capture it by force. In this struggle that followed the linga got split into two. In the "Jyothis" that arose from it "THRIMOORTHIS" (Brahma, Vishnu and Siva) and Parvathy appeared on the spot.

Parvathy told Mandhatha this idol was very dear to me. Still I do not want to take it away from you against the wishes of my husband. Separation from it is also difficult for me. So I will enter that linga and remain here forever. My daughter kali is not different from me. Actually she came here first. Let her also be installed near me facing north and have all poojas and festival performed. So same Parvathy disappeared into the idol. This spot is the "SREEMOOLASTHANAM". The sivalinga here is still in split condition. Its position is below the "peedam" and "Prabhamandalam" and can be seen only during the abhisheka before the ushapooja and "Malarnivedia" to the deity.

As ordered by Parvathy, Bhadrakali with Sapthamathrukkal, Veerabhadra and Ganapaty were installed facing north. This is called "Mathrusala". Pooram, Pattu and all such festivals intended for this goddess.

When Sree Parvathy appears infant Ganapathy was also with her. This infant Ganapathy also been installed at sreemoolasthanam.

Sree Parvathy appeared facing west. The installations of Sivalinga at Sreemoolasthanam were facing east. It was thus for necessary to have two darshan openings one to the east and the other to west. The family descendants of "Valluva Konathiri" do not generally open the one on the west except for darshan. On either side of the doorway here are two openings through which other worshippers can have darshan of the deity. But in recent past the restrictions has been modified. After each pooja, the door is kept open for some time for darshan of the deity by devotees.

Mandhatha spent many years at thirumandhamkunnu in meditation and thapusu. At last he knew it was time for him to leave this world. He was thinking of entrusting the temple to someone for perfect upkeep and maintenance when two Brahmins came there. Mandhatha told them his desire gave them a Grandha containing instructions on the performance of poojas and entrusted the shrine to them. He then retired to the jungle nearby now known as "KUKSHIPPARAKKAD" and freed himself from this world of mortals by his yogic powers. Bhakthas who go round this jungle paying homage pick out a leaf from the growing plants and keep it in hair with at most reverence. This area is still a protected jungle. In the Devaprashna conducted in 1959 it was observed that an idol of mandhatha should be installed here and poojas, performed. The temple priests before pooja every Malayalam month. The annual pooja on Chithra in midhunam on Mandhatha is on special significance.

Two Brahmins entrusted with the upkeep of temple, one cleared the jungle around the idol and hence came to be known as "Kattillamuttam" . The other prepared pavilion for prathishta and came to be known as "PANTHALAKODE". The thanthri of thirumandhamkunnu temple is still a descendant from either of these families. The nair karyasthan who was with them was given the title "chathathumarar" and made the blower of holy conch in the temple. The Namboodiri's informed the news to Vadakkara swaroopam raja that was subordinate chieftain of valluvanadu raja holding the title mannarmala raja. He immediately rushed to the spot (Seeing the over-lord of the hill the goddess got up and paid homage to him. This humility of Devi-the sustainer of three worlds—made the raja blink in shame and) he prayed to the goddess to see him as a son. He then presented an elephant to the goddess and worshipped her from its rear, standing in its shadow. His descendants also followed the same practice. Even now direct darshan of thirumandhamkunnu Bhagavathy is not permissible to mannarmala raja.

The first Vallavaraja who took over the control of the temple entrusted its upkeep and maintenance to the local feudal lords Ettuveetil achans and made them trusty Erukalikara nair was made kavudaya nair. Sreemoolasthanam does not have a roof, which is an evidence of it having been a kavu.

The painting on the walls of the mathrusala throws light to this legend. These paintings which are in lying with the wall painting at suchindram, Pundarikkapuram, vaikom and Guruvayoor were executed in 1944.

Thirumandhamkunnu Pooram, the annual festival of the temple is an 11-day-long celebration which is a major festival in the district of Malappuram in which Aarattu is a beautiful custom. Aaraattu, the bathing ceremony of Devi, in which the holy idol is carried on the tallest elephant accompanied by 5 other elephants leading to the lake nearby the temple. The idol is given a holy bath by the main offerer of the temple and taken back into the temple.

== See also ==
13 Shakteya Temples of Kerala

1. Mannampurath Kavu, Neeleswaram
2. Thiruvarkkattu Kavu or Madaayi Kavu, Pazhayangadi
3. Kalari Vatulkkal Kavu, Valapattanam
4. Mamanikkunnu Kavu, Irikkur
5. Thiruvancheri Kavu, Kuthuparamba
6. Kaliyam Kavu, Vadakara, Edacheri
7. Pishari Kavu, Koyilandi, Kollam(Malabar)
8. Thiruvalayanaadu Kavu, Kozhikode
9. Kodikkunnathu Kavu, Pattambi
10. Thirumandham kunnu Kavu, Angadippuram
11. Kodungallur Kavu, Thrissur
12. Muthoot Kavu, Thiruvalla
13. Panayannar Kavu, Mannar, Thiruvalla
- 108 Shiva Temples
- Temples of Kerala
- Parumala Valiya Panayannarkavu Devi Temple
