= Pisharikavu =

Hindu temple in Kerala, India

Pisharikavu Temple
- പിഷാരികാവ് ക്ഷേത്രം
- Location in Kerala

Religion
- Affiliation: Hinduism
- District: Kozhikode
- Festivals: Meenam Utsavam, Navaratri
- Governing body: Malabar Devaswom Board

Location
- Location: Kollam, Koyilandy
- State: Kerala
- Country: India
- Interactive map of Pisharikavu Temple
- Coordinates: 11.4582°N 75.6785°E

Architecture
- Type: Traditional Kerala style

Website
- Official website

Pisharikavu Temple is a temple of the Hindu goddess Bhadrakali at Kollam, Koyilandy, Kozhikode district, Kerala state of south India.

== See also ==
13 Shakteys Temples of Kerala

1. Mannampurath Kavu, Neeleswaram
2. Thiruvarkkattu Kavu or Madaayi Kavu, Pazhayangadi
3. Kalari Vatulkkal Kavu, Valapattanam
4. Mamanikkunnu Kavu, Irikkur
5. Thiruvancheri Kavu, Kuthuparamba
6. Kaliyam Kavu, Vadakara, Edacheri
7. Pishari Kavu, Koyilandi
8. Thiruvalayanaadu Kavu, Kozhikode
9. Kodikkunnathu Kavu, Pattambi
10. Thirumandham kunnu Kavu, Angadippuram
11. Kodungallur Kavu, Thrissur
12. Muthoot Kavu, Thiruvalla
13. Panayannar Kavu, Mannar, Thiruvalla
