= Thirumandhamkunnu Pooram =

Indian temple festival

Thirumandhamkunnu Pooram place അങ്ങാടിപ്പുറം
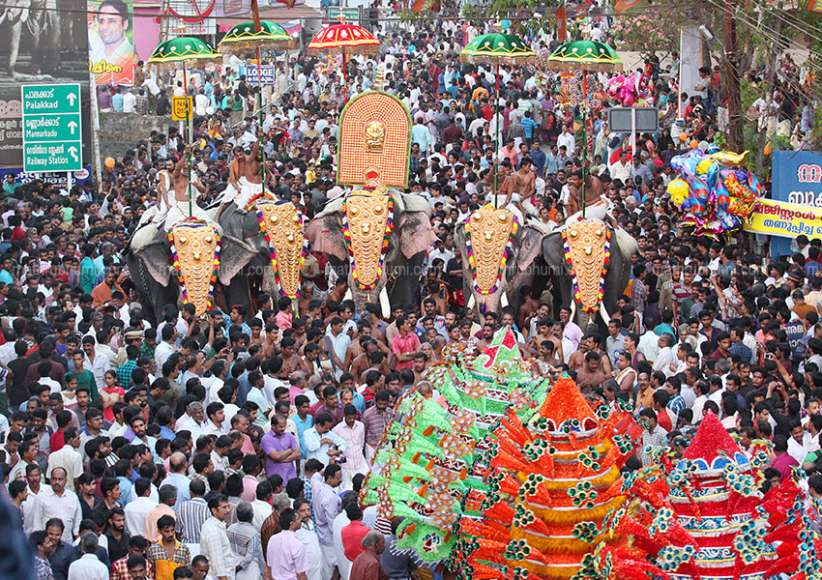
- Thirumandhamkunnu Pooram
- Official name: Thirumandhamkunnu(Malayalam: തിരുമാന്ധാംകുന്ന് പൂരം)
- Observed by: Malayali Hindus
- Type: Hindu temple festival Festival/Public holidays in city of Malappuram
- Significance: Hindu temple festival
- Observances: Ottamthullal (ഓട്ടൻതുള്ളൽ), Ilanjithara Melam (ഇലഞ്ഞിത്തറമേളം), Fireworks (വെടിക്കെട്ട്)
- Date: Makayiram Nakshatra in the Malayalam Calendar month of Meenam (March 25, 2026 - April 4, 2026)

Thirumandhamkunnu Pooram (Malayalam: തിരുമാന്ധാംകുന്ന് പൂരം) is an important temple festival of Central Malabar, Kerala, India. Thriumandhamkunnu Temple is said to be one among the three important Bhagavathi temples of Kerala, the others being Kodungallur and Panayannarkavu. Daily pooja attracts thousands of devotees. The famous Mangalya Pooja attracts thousands of young girls, who seeks fortune of a good wedlock. Next year the Pooram festival will start from March 25, 2026 and will end on April 04, 2026 with large public participants.

The festival lasts for 11 days from Makayiram star in Meenam (March, April). There is evidence to prove that the pooram festival has a history going back to the early decades of the 16th century in the palm leaf records of Calicut University. People from different parts of the State have started reaching Angadipuram to seek.

The idol of the Bhagavathi was taken out of the sanctum sanctorum on a caparisoned elephant for a holy bath called ‘arat,' accompanied by elephants, nagaswaram and chendamelam. The ‘arat' will continue for 10 days. Thousands of people lined up on both sides of the road for a close glimpse of the deity as the procession was taken out, marking the ‘Poorappurappadu.' The main event of this festival is Aarattu. The same is performed 21 times, in a sequence of one in the morning and one in the evening, for ten days and the final Aarattu on the eleventh day evening. Tenth day (03 April) evening is Pallivetta.

On the Pooram day mid night there is a ceremonial meeting between Valluvakkonathiri, the king of the erstwhile kingdom of Valluvanadu and Malayankutty, the head of Pana community who comes to the Pooram ground on a palanquin. It is known as Panante Varavu. This commemorates the religious harmony and the help rendered by the tribal chieftain to the Raja in bygone days. The twelfth day, from morning to evening there will be the performance of folk form Chavittukali. Ottamthullal, Paadhakom, Chakyar Kooth, Nagyarkouth, Thayambaka, Melam, cultural programmes etc. are performed during the festival days. Folk form Poothan is performed during the festival days at temple premise.

== See also ==
- Mamankam festival
- Vairankode Bhagavathy Temple
- Vairankode Vela
