= Banarjhula =

Former Village Development Committee in Nepal

Banarjhula बनरझुला
- Village development committee
- Location in Nepal
- Coordinates: 26.64°N 86.57°E
- Country: Nepal
- Zone: Sagarmatha Zone
- District: Saptari District

Population (2011)
  - Total: 4,424
- Time zone: UTC+5:45 (Nepal Time)

Banarjhula is a village development committee in Saptari District in the Sagarmatha Zone of south-eastern Nepal. At the time of the 2011 Nepal census it had a population of 4424 people living in 859 individual households. It includes the village of Kanchira.
