= Onnu Kure Ayiram Yogam =

Onnu Kure Ayiram Yogam (Malayalam: ഒന്നു കുറെ ആയിരം യോഗം), abbreviated as O. K. A. Y., is an association of members of the Nair community in the Kodungallur, Thrissur district, Kerala State, in southern India. The title "Onnu Kure Ayiram Yogam" translates as "the Association of a Thousand Minus One". The yogam or association was an organization of Nairs of the Kodungallur region and various sub-castes of the Nair community had representations in the association.

The members of the association were the administrators of the Kodungallur Bhagavathy Temple (now with the Cochin Devaswom Board). The meetings of the association used to be held on the first day of every month in front of the Kodungallur Bhagavathy temple (and considered "all matters" pertaining to the subjects who are within their jurisdiction and took appropriate decisions).

Today, the organization is usually referred to by its acronym, "O. K. A. Y" or "O. K. Yogam". It is currently a registered Society headed by a President and a Secretary.

== History ==
=== Early medieval period ===
The Ayiram Yogam ("the Thousand") was once an armed contingent under the medieval Chera rulers of Kerala State (who had their capital at Kodungallur). It was composed of a thousand Nair warriors serving the Chera king (the Perumal). The body exclusively acted as the personal bodyguards or "Companions of Honour" of the Chera ruler. The chief of the Ayiram body is also recorded as participating in royal assemblies with the Chera ruler. Corresponding armed personal guards of some local chiefs (under the Chera rule) were called the Nizhal or "the Shadow". In this context, the body "Ayiram" might also be called a "Nizhal". The Ayiram Yogam also managed and protected the Kodungallur Bhagavathy Temple at Kodungallur in this period. It had a significant role in the famous Bharani festival of the Kodungallur Temple.

The military organization of a chieftaincy under the Chera rule was called the "Nuttuvar" (the Hundred). In some chieftaincies, the body Nuttuvar can be identified with the Nizhal. However, in some other regions, Nuttuvar appears to be an independent entity (irrespective of the identity of the chief or his Nizhal). It is also been suggested that the Nizhal and the Nuttuvar were the recipients of the protection dues ("the rakshabhogam") from temples. It is also recorded that the formidable chieftain of Kolathunadu also maintained an "Ayiram".

Kerala traditions give accounts of the removal and execution of the leader of the Chera king's personal guards during reign of the last Chera sovereign (the Thousand thus becoming a Thousand Minus One).

=== After the Chera state ===
Even after the dissolution of Chera state in the early 12th century, the organization continued to exist; but they decided not to fill the absence of their leader. Hence the number shrank to nine hundred and ninety nine and the association became known by its present name ("the Association of a Thousand Minus One"). After the end of the Chera state, the body switched its role from with military and police functions to managing the affairs of the temple (with rights and privileges during the Bharani Festival).

After the end of the medieval Chera state, when the Kodungallur Royal Family took over the administration in of the city of Kodungallur, the association and the Kodungallur kings used to meet and take joint decisions on the administration of the Kodungallur Bhagavathy Temple on the first day of every month of the Kollam Calendar.

The Association also performed a ritual called "Nizhalirikkal" (the Meeting of the Nizhal), after "Pantheeradi Puja", at the eastern gate of the Kodungallur temple in continuation of the monthly meeting. Nizhalirikkal was a committee on administration of the temple which had a quorum of 32 members. Pantheeradi ("twelve feet") Puja ("worship") is one of the daily worship rituals performed in Kerala temples when the shadow of the Sun reaches 12 feet of length.

== Present-day operations ==
The Onnu Kure Ayiram Yogam continues to have considerable rights and privileges in the Kodungallur Bhagavathy Temple.

Today the Onnu Kure Ayiram Yogam directly administers the functions of the Kodungallur Bhagavathy Temple on important dates. For example, it funds and administers the functions on the first day of the Thalappoli Festival or the Onnam Thalappoli Festival (the Thalappoli Festival is a four-day festival being held in January each year). The thalams are carried by women from the member families of the Onnu Kure Ayiram Yogam association.
