= Panayannarkavu =

- Village
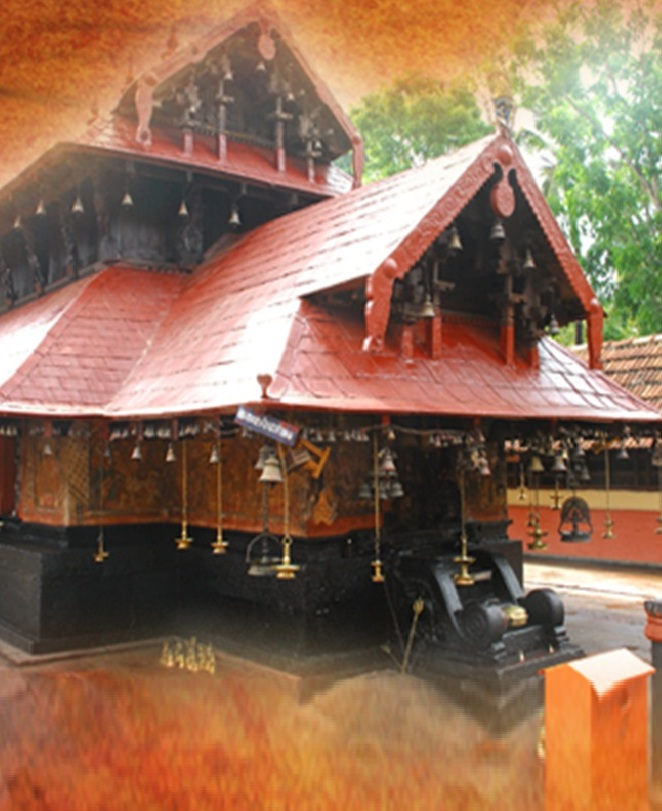
- Valiya Panayannarkavu Devi Temple

- Location in Kerala, India
- Coordinates: 9°19′29″N 76°32′13″E
- Country: Thiruvalla Taluk, India
- State: Kerala
- District: Pathanamthitta

Languages
  - Official: Malayalam, English
- Time zone: UTC+5:30 (IST)
- PIN: 689626 (Parumala Post Office)
- Telephone code: 91-479-231****(Mannar telephone exchange)
- Vehicle registration: KL-27 Thiruvalla Sub RTO
- Nearest city: Thiruvalla
- Lok Sabha constituency: Pathanamthitta

Panayannarkavu is a small village In Thiruvalla Sub-District on Parumala Island in the Pamba River in Thiruvalla taluk of Pathanamthitta district in Kerala, India. The village is known for the presence of the Parumala Valiya Panayannarkavu Devi Temple, of which Saptha matha (Seven Goddess) is the presiding power. There is also a temple of Siva on the premises. Panayannarkavu is 3 km (1.9 mi) from Mannar, a village known for its bell-metal lamps and vessels. Until recently, esoteric tantric rituals were conducted in this Saktheya temple.

== See also ==
13 Shakteya Temples of Kerala

1. Mannampurath Kavu, Neeleswaram
2. Thiruvarkkattu Kavu (Madaayi Kavu), Pazhayangadi
3. Kalari Vatulkkal Kavu, Valapattanam
4. Mamanikkunnu Kavu, Irikkur
5. Thiruvancheri Kavu, Kuthuparamba
6. Kaliyam Kavu, Vadakara, Edacheri
7. Pishari Kavu, Koyilandi, Kollam(Malabar)
8. Thiruvalayanaadu Kavu, Kozhikode
9. Kodikkunnathu Kavu, Pattambi
10. Thirumandham kunnu Kavu, Angadippuram
11. Kodungallur Kavu, Thrissur
12. Muthoot Kavu, Thiruvalla
13. Panayannar Kavu, Mannar, Thiruvalla
- Parumala Valiya Panayannarkavu Devi Temple
- Parumala
- Mannar

== Sources ==
- https://www.templespedia.com/panayannarkavu-devi-kshethram/
- Parumala Valiya Panayannar Kavu
- Website on Panayannar Kavu Temple
