= Kanchira =

Kanchira is the biggest and densely populated village of Saptari District of Nepal. This village lies in the Banarjhula village Development Community. This village has one high school, two primary schools, one madrasah (an Islamic primary education school), one health post, one postal office and one women's and disabled children's training center which is run by the Environmental Development Forum.

== Environmental Development Forum ==
The Everest Development Forum (EDF) is also called Sagarmatha Bikash Manch. This organisation started a buffalo program. 55 farmers are involved in this program. The program gives buffalo to farmers who are economically very weak, without taking any kind of deposits. The program is supported by Namaste e.V, Kiel, Germany.
