= Annapurneshwari Temple, Cherukunnu =

Hindu temple in Kerala, India

Annapoorneswari Temple
- ചെറുകുന്ന് അന്നപൂർണേശ്വരി ക്ഷേത്രം
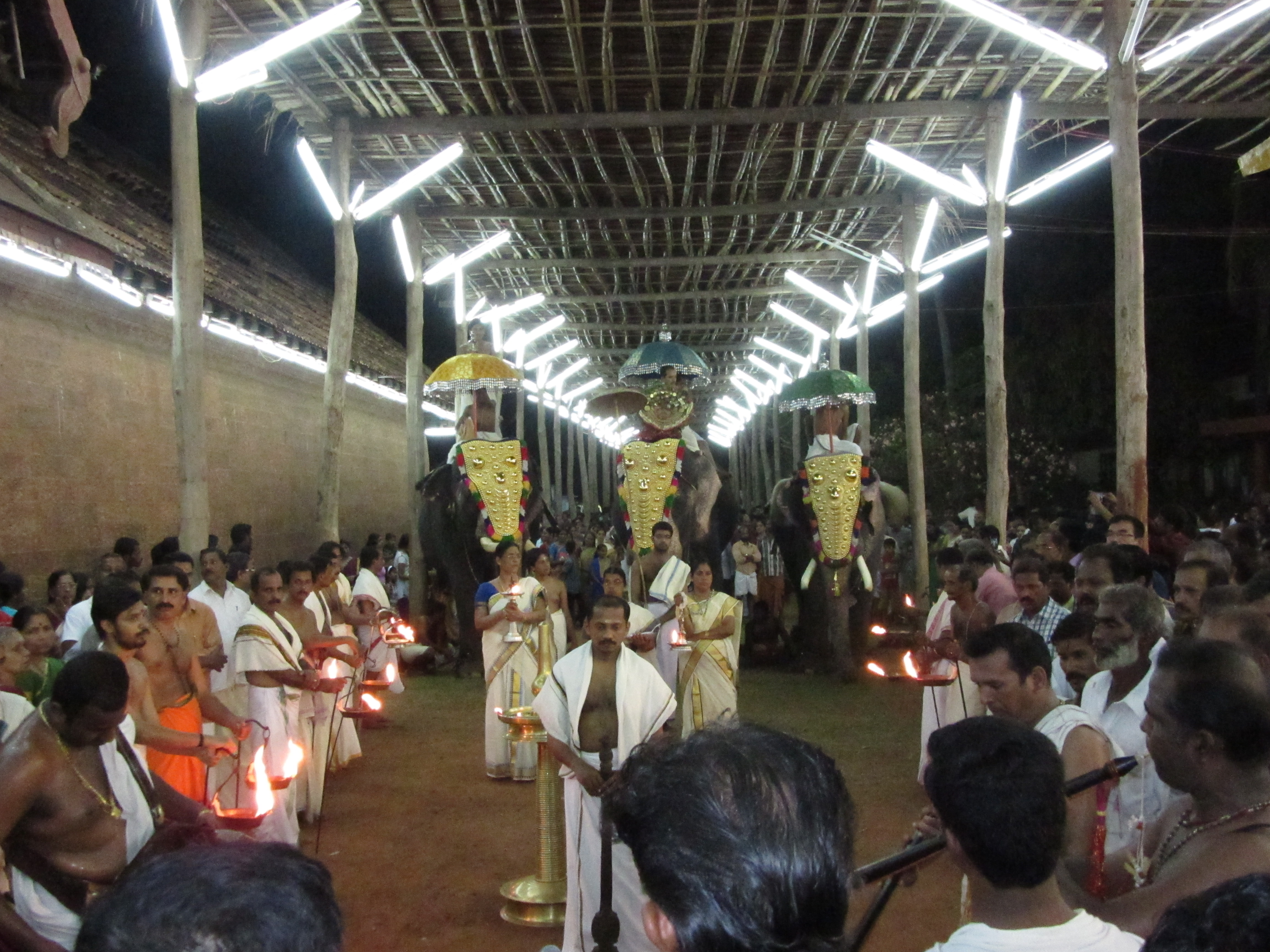
- Annapoorneswari Temple Vishu Vilak Utsav

Religion
- Affiliation: Hinduism
- District: Kannur
- Deity: Annapurna and Krishna
- Festivals: Janmashtami, Vishu, Ekadasi
- Governing body: Malabar Devaswom

Location
- Location: Cherukunnu
- State: Kerala
- Country: India
- Interactive map of Annapoorneswari Temple
- Coordinates: 11°59′19″N 75°18′06″E

Architecture
- Type: Kerala Architecture

Website
- www.cherukunnuannapoorneswaritemple.in

Annapoorneshwari Temple is a Hindu temple in Kannur, Kerala. The deity is worshipped as Annapurneshwari (Annapurna), the goddess of food.

== About the Temple ==
At this temple, Lord Krishna is co-located along with Goddess Sree Annapoorneswari. It is believed that Sree Annapoorneswari did visit the shrine which was under the sea, centuries ago.

== Story of temple ==
The temple was formally a Vishnu/Krishna Temple, dating back some 1500 years. The temple after Amma's Prathishta (giving sacred power to the idol of Annapoorneshwari) was built by Avittam thirunal Raja Raja Varma of Chirakkal Kovilakam. In Hindu mythology, it is said that the goddess arrived from Kashi with two other goddesses or devis ( Kalarivathikal Amma and Madai Kavail Amma) and a boatman in a golden ship, and disembarked at Azhi Theeram which is now known as Aayiram Thengu.

The Puna Prathistha was done on 23 February 1994, in the month of Kumbham in the Malayalam calendar, Pooyam Nakshtram, which now is observed as the Prathista Dinam every year.

The main festivities in the Temple start from the Malayalam month of Medam Shankramam (13/14 April), and is celebrated in the following seven days. The other festivals that are celebrated in the temple are Shiva Rathri, Navami, Ekadashi etc.

The temple is presently under the Malabar Devaswom Board, and is maintained by the Temple Committee. A unique characteristic of this temple is that it is built of one single type of rock, and the Sree Kovil of both Annapoorneshwari and Krishnan is of the same size as per Vasthu, signifying that both the goddess and the god are given equal importance. The Entrance of the temple is in front of Krishnan's Sree Kovil, and the reason there isn't a direct entrance to Annapoorneshwari's Sree Kovil is because during the olden days, it was believed that women from Brahmin families aren't supposed to be seen directly (Antharjanam). Hence there is a small window that is right in front of the Sree Kovil so that people can view the idol from outside.

This temple is one among the two Annapoorneshwari temples in Kerala. It was built using polished stones and put together using avil and vellam (a mixture of flattened rice and jaggery). Next to the Temple is the Temple pond, also known the Ambala Chera, which is approximately 2.5 acres in area. In the centre is the Pole, otherwise known as the stumpa. The four major entrances of the Chera have been built using large layers of rock laid parallel to each other. The Chera also has a Kulappura (used by poojaris for bathing), located to the southwest of the Chera.

== See also ==
- Marikamba Temple, Sirsi
