= Madayi Kavu =

Hindu temple in Kerala, India

Madayikkavu
- Tiruvarkkadu Bhagavathy Temple
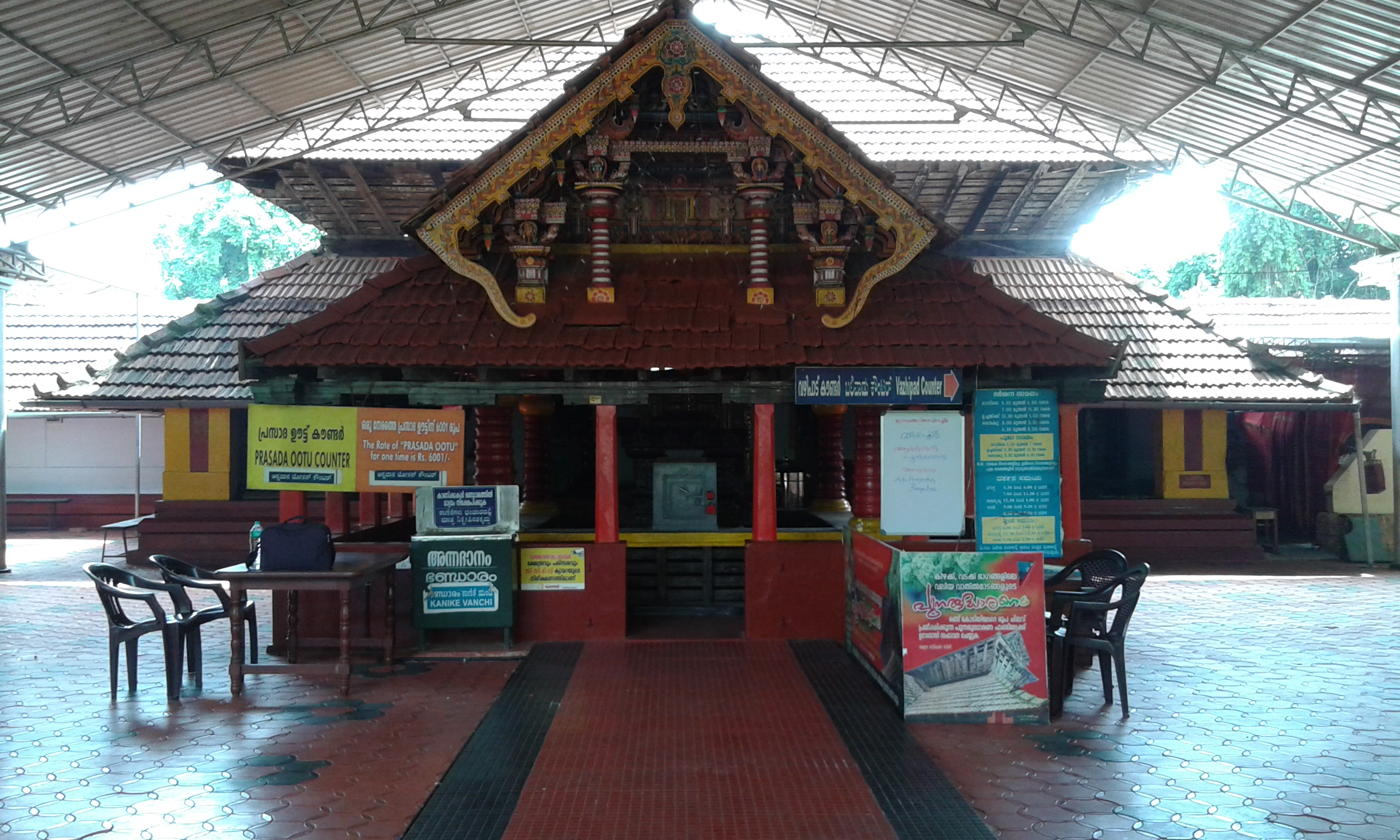
- Tiruvarkkadu Bhagavathy Temple

Religion
- Affiliation: Hinduism
- District: Kannur
- Deity: Bhadrakali
- Governing body: Malabar Devaswom Board

Location
- Location: Pazhayangadi, Kannur
- State: Kerala
- Interactive map of Madayikkavu
- Coordinates: 12°2′4.99″N 75°15′41.14″E

Architecture
- Type: Kerala architecture
- Creator: Parashurama, Chirakkal Kingdom
- Temple: 4 sanctums

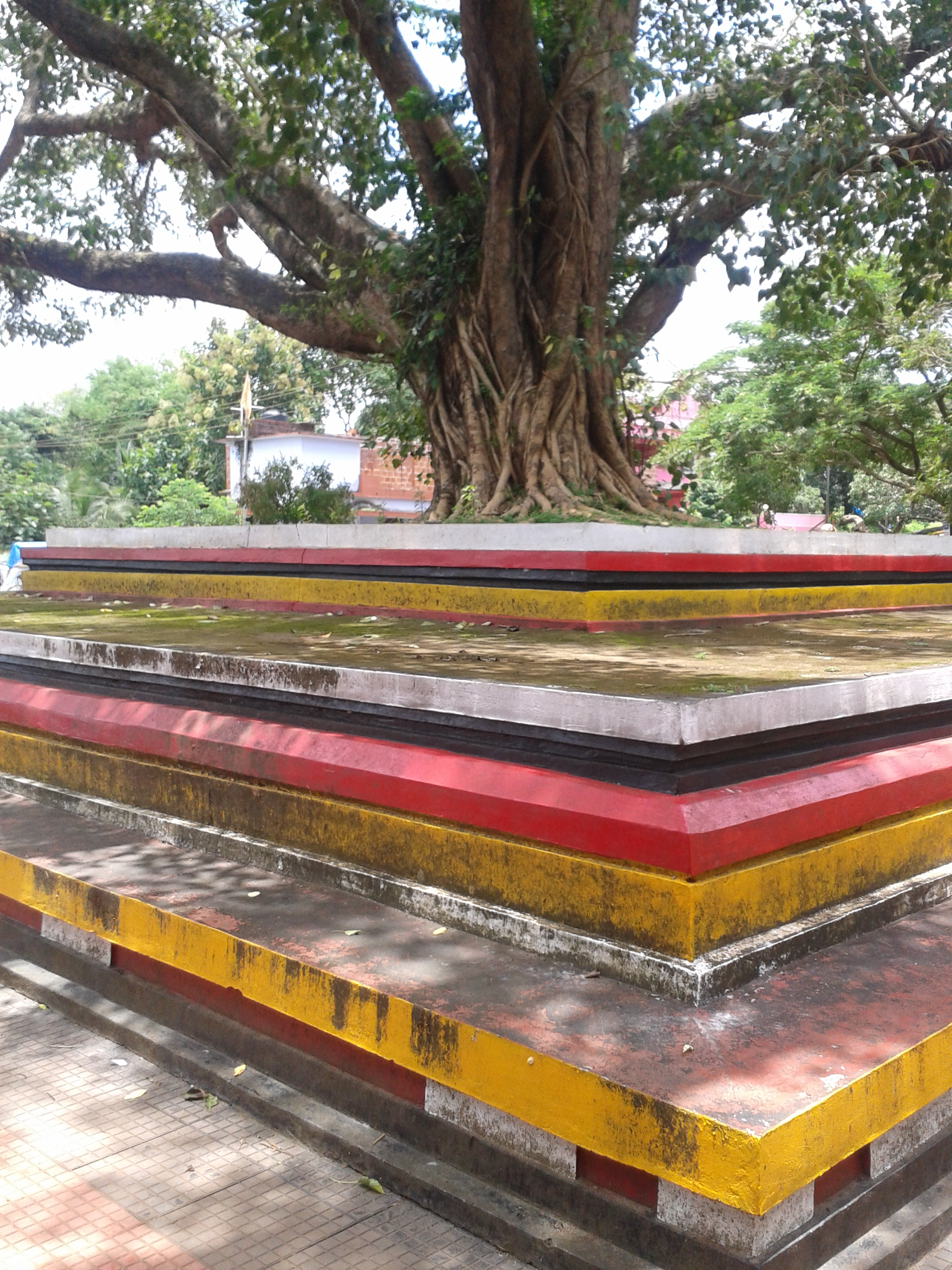
The Arayal Thara in front of Tiruvarkad Bhagavathy Temple (Madayi Kavu). Arayal in Malayalam is synonymous to Bodhi Tree or Pippallam

Thiruvarkadu Bhagavathi Temple (a.k.a. Madayi Kavu) is a famous temple dedicated to Bhadrakali in Kerala. The deity is the Fierce form of Bhadrakali. The Bhagavathy is addressed by tantrics in the vicinity as Tiruvarkkad Achchi due to this. The temple administration is Malabar Devaswom Board. The temple is a revered shrine of Chirakkal Royal Family and a shrine of Chirakkal devaswom before. The temple is situated in Madayi, Pazhayangadi, hence prominently known as Madayi Kavu.

== Worship ==
Kattumadom Esanan Namboothirippad is the Tantri (Head Priest) of the shrine. Kattumadom is one of the four major Mantravada clan of Brahmin families in Kerala.

The major festival of the temple is Pooram in March. There are also festivals in the Malayalam months of Thulam, Vrishchikam and Makaram in addition to the Pooram in Meenam. The Perumkaliyattam is in the Malayalam month of Idavam. The temple is also associated with the Bhadrakali temple of Mannanpurathu Kavu (Nileshwaram) and Vadukunnu Shiva Temple.

The Shiva shrine faces east, while the Bhadrakali shrine faces towards the west. A particular aspect of the temple is Kozhi Kalasham, which is the sacrifice of poultry for the goddess which is held in high regard.

== Notable visitors ==
- B. S. Yediyurappa, former chief minister of Karnataka
- Darshan Thoogudeepa, film actor

== See also ==
- Madayi Vadukunda Shiva Temple
- Madayipara
- Rajarajeshwara Temple
- Annapurneshwari Temple, Cherukunnu
- Kalarivathukkal Temple
