= Bhadrakali =

Hindu goddess

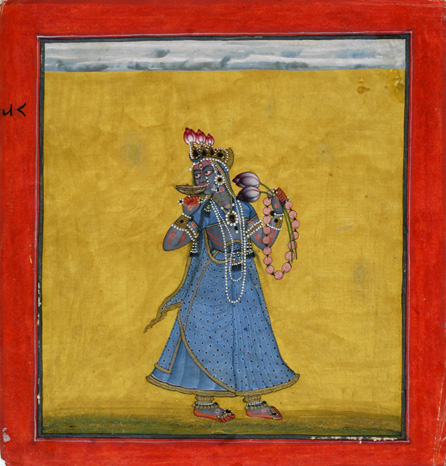
- Goddess Bhadrakali, gouache on paper (ca. 1660–70)
- Other names: Mahamaya
- Mantra: oṃ bhadrakāl̤yai namaḥ
- Weapon: sword, trident, mace, discus, bow and arrow, noose, skull, rudraksha beads
- Day: Tuesday or Friday
- Mount: Vetala
- Texts: Shiva Purana, Kalika Purana, Devi Bhagavata Purana
- Consort: Virabhadra

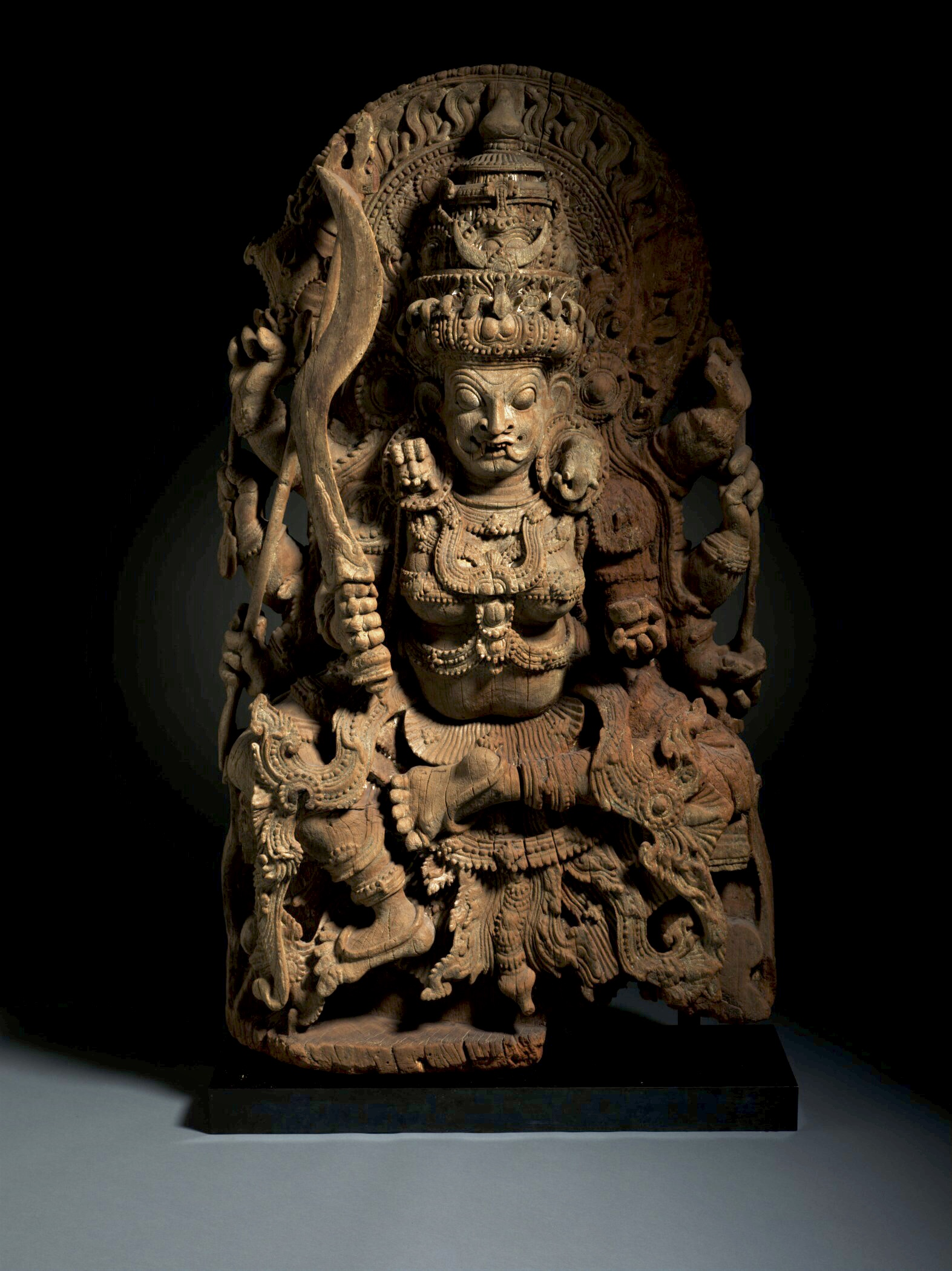
A 17th-century wooden sculpture of Bhadrakali from Kerala

Bhadrakali (Sanskrit: भद्रकाली, romanized: Bhadrakālī, lit. 'auspicious Kali') is a fierce form of the Hindu supreme goddess Adi Shakti. She is worshipped predominantly in the South Indian state of Kerala and Nashik.

In Vaishnavism, Bhadrakali is among the many epithets of Yogamaya, the younger sister of the preserver deity, Vishnu and an incarnation of the supreme goddess (Para Brahman) Durga. In some Shaiva traditions, she is the consort and the power (Shakti) of Virabhadra, a form of Shiva.

== Etymology ==
The name Bhadra comes from Sanskrit. In Sanskrit, "bhadra" means "auspicious" or "fortunate". Another interpretation traces the name to the Sanskrit root word (bija akshara) "bha" and "dra". The letter "bha" signifies "delusion" or "maya", while "dra" is used as a superlative meaning "the most" or "the greatest". Together, "bhadra" may mean "maha maya" or "great delusion".

== Legend ==
According to the Brahma Purana, after learning of the self-immolation of his consort Sati at her father Daksha's yajna, an enraged Shiva beat the earth with his matted hair. Virabhadra and Bhadrakali emerged from this act, and were commanded to lay waste to the yajna in vengeance.

According to Tamil Puranas, Lankalakshmi, the guardian of Lanka, tried to stop Hanuman from entering the city. Struck down by him, she regained her true form as Bhadrakali and returned to Kailasha. When she told Shiva she wished to witness the Lanka War between Rama and Ravana, he instructed her to go to the Dravida region and dwell in a temple with a self-manifested lingam. There, he said, he would personally compose the Ramayana in Tamil, allowing her to see and hear the story. In time, Shiva was born as the son of Cinkaravalli, a widow devoted to the deity of the temple. Fearing scandal, she abandoned the child, who was found and adopted by a local chieftain and named Kambar. Under the Chola king, Kambar and the poet Ottakkuttar were tasked with composing the Ramayana in Tamil. While Ottakkuttar completed his section, Kambar delayed until the final night, when the goddess Saraswati was said to have written the verses for him. The next day, the poem astonished the royal court, and the story of the war was performed before the goddess. Thus, Shiva, as Kambar, fulfilled his promise, reciting the Ramayana while Bhadrakali watched and danced.

== Worship ==
According to Kerala traditions, the events described in the Markandeya Purana associated with Bhadrakali (her slaying of the demon Darika to liberate the universe from evil) took place in Kerala, near Madayi in the Kannur District. She is seen to protect the honour of women and to bestow all spiritual knowledge. In Kerala, she is worshipped as a kuladevata of Nair clans.

== See also ==
- Bhadrakali Temple, Warangal
- Koh-I-Noor
