= Taliparamba taluk =

Taluka in Kerala, India

Taliparamba taluk Thaliparamba
- Taluk
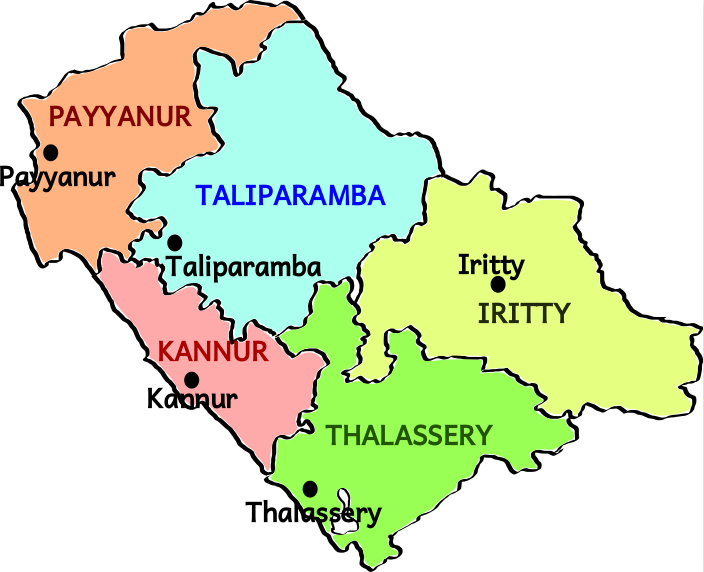
- Taluks of Kannur

- Location in Kerala, India Taliparamba taluk (India)
- Coordinates: 12°05′30″N 75°26′29″E
- Country: India
- State: Kerala
- District: Kannur

Government
  - Type: Taluk
  - Body: Taliparamba taluk
  - Tehsildar: E. M. Reji

Area
  - Taluk: 824.76 km^{2} (318.44 sq mi)
  - Urban: 249.54 km^{2} (96.35 sq mi)
  - Rural: 575.22 km^{2} (222.09 sq mi)

Population (2011)
  - Taluk: 481,746
  - Density: 584.10/km^{2} (1,512.8/sq mi)
  - Urban: 191,689
  - Urban density: 768.17/km^{2} (1,989.5/sq mi)
  - Rural: 290,057
  - Rural density: 504.25/km^{2} (1,306.0/sq mi)

Languages
  - Official: Malayalam, English
- Time zone: UTC+5:30 (IST)
- PIN: 670xxx
- Telephone code: 0460
- Vehicle registration: KL 59
- Nearest city: Kannur
- Lok Sabha constituency: Kannur
- Niyama Sabha constituency: Taliparamba, Irikkur

Taliparamba taluk is one of the five taluks in Kannur district in the state of Kerala, India. It borders Payyanur taluk in the north, Kannur taluk and Thalassery taluk in the south and Iritty taluk in the east. It is a revenue division for the ease of administrative purposes, and is headquartered in Taliparamba. Most government offices are in the Mini Civil Station in Taliparamba. Taliparamba taluk consists of Taliparamba Municipality, Anthoor Municipality, Sreekandapuram Municipality and 15 surrounding panchayats.

== Constituent villages ==
Taliparamba taluk has 28 villages.

- Alakode, Anthoor, Cheleri, Chengalayi
- Chuzhali, Eruvessi, Irikkur, Kayaralam
- Kolachery, Kooveri, Kurumathur, Kuttiattoor
- Kuttiyeri, Malapattam, Maniyoor, Mayyil
- Morazha, Nediyanga, New Naduvil, Panniyoor
- Pariyaram, Pattuvam, Payyavoor, Sreekandapuram
- Taliparamba, Thimiri, Udayagiri and Vellad

== Demographics ==
Religions in Taliparamba Subdistrict (2011)
1. Hinduism (56.0%)
2. Islam (23.8%)
3. Christianity (19.9%)
4. Other (0.35%)

As of 2011 Census, Taliparamba taluk had a population of 764,888 where 365,811 are males and 399,077 are females. The average sex ratio was 1091. 36.3% of the population lives in urban areas and 63.7% in rural areas. 11% of the population in the taluk was under 6 years of age. The average literacy rate was 93.85%.

== Geography ==
Taliparamba taluk consists of highland and midland regions including rubber, pepper, cashew and coconut plantations. It has a predominantly agrarian economy.
