= Koonam =

- village
- Location in Kerala, India Koonam (India)
- Coordinates: 12°03′49.2″N 75°25′42.1″E
- Country: India
- State: Kerala
- District: Kannur
- Elevation: 56 m (184 ft)

Languages
  - Official: Malayalam, English
- Time zone: UTC+5:30 (IST)
- PIN: 670142
- Telephone code: 0460
- ISO 3166 code: IN-KL
- Vehicle registration: KL 59

Koonam is a village in Taliparamba taluk in Kannur district of Kerala, India. It comes under Kurumathur and Chengalayi Panchayats. It is located about 9 km (5.6 mi) from Taliparamba and 30 km (19 mi) north of Kannur.

== Demographics ==
As of 2001 India census, Koonam had a population of 5000. Most of the residents speak Malayalam.

== Politics ==
Koonam is traditionally a communist stronghold. But Indian National congress has strong influence in this Village. Koonam village falls under Taliparamba assembly constituency which is part of Kannur (Lok Sabha constituency).

== How to reach there ==
Koonam is located about 3 km from State Highway 36 (Kerala). The highway is 46.0 km (28.6 mi) long and nearest National Highway 17 (India, old numbering) access is at Taliparamba (9 km (5.6 mi)). It has been now renumbered as NH-66.

- Nearest city: Kannur - 30 km (19 mi)
- Nearest airport: Kannur International Airport - 36 km (22 mi)

== Biodiversity of Koonam Village ==
Koonam is a unique village by Nature well known for its diversity of grasslands.

The midland rocks of northern Kerala have its own characteristic floral composition supporting hillock system in supporting a unique assemblage of species and cashew plantations.

Koonam is surrounded by rocky terrain and grasslands.

Kurumathoor, chuzali, Chavanapuzha, Kalliasseri, Poomangalam, Panniyoor, Mazhur, Pappinisseri, are the nearby villages to Koonam. It is near to Arabian sea.

Large parcels of land has been under the Government of Kerala (occupied in 1970 as part of the Land reforms act), so in the coming years it is expected to see some developments.

== Educational institutions ==
Schools

- Koonam LP School.
- Largest Industrial Training Institute (ITI)

== Transportation ==
The national highway passes through Taliparamba town. Goa and Mumbai can be accessed on the northern side and Cochin and Thiruvananthapuram can be accessed on the southern side. Taliparamba has a good bus station and buses are easily available to all parts of Kannur district. The road to the east of Iritty connects to Mysore and Bangalore. But buses to these cities are available only from Kannur, 22 km to the south. The nearest railway stations are Kannapuram and Kannur on Mangalore-Palakkad line. Trains are available to almost all parts of India subject to advance booking over the internet. There are airports at Kannur, Mangalore and Calicut. All of them are small international airports with direct flights available only to Middle Eastern countries.

== Landmarks ==
- Nearest Temple :Koonam Ayyappan Temple which is the only temple in this village.
- Nearest Mosque :Koonam Badr Juma Maajid which the masjid in this village Koonam Mosque .
- Nearest Temple: Poomangalam Someswari Temple -1.3 km
- Famous Playground :Angakalari Koonam play ground
- Famous Temple : Rajarajeshwara Temple -8 km
- Famous Temple : Trichambaram Temple -9 km
- Nearest Tourist places: Parassinikkadavu -10 km
- Nanoos General merchant : one super market in koonam started in 1940

== See also ==
- Krishi Vigyan Kendra Kannur
- National Institute of Fashion Technology
- Government College of Engineering, Kannur
- District Agricultural Farm, Taliparamba
- Sir Syed College
- Muthappan temple
- Kunnathoor Padi
- Udayagiri, Kannur
- Kuppam Taliparamba
