= Kuppam River =

River in India

Kuppam River Mattool River
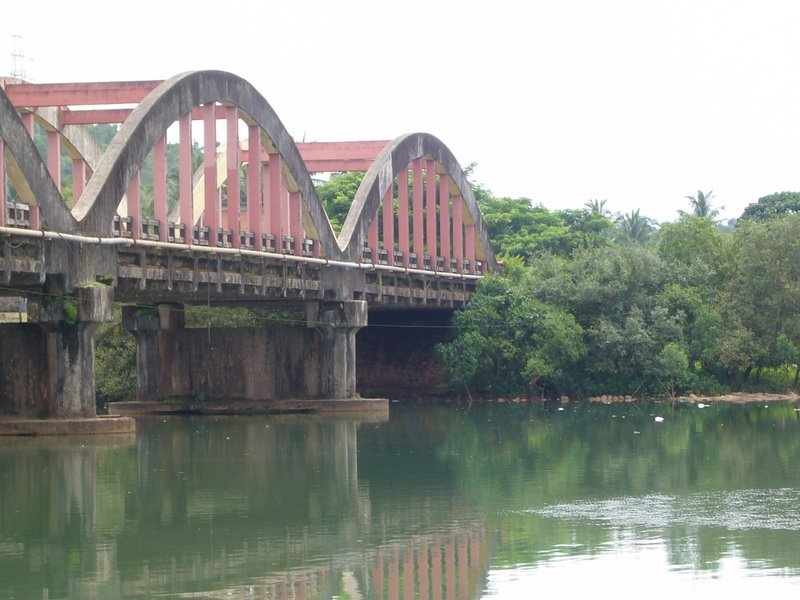
- Kuppam Bridge on the NH 66

Location
- Country: India
- States: Kerala, Karnataka
- District: Kannur, Kodagu
- Towns: Taliparamba, Pattuvam, Pazhayangadi, Mattool

Physical characteristics
- Source: Padinalkad Ghat Reserve Forest, Karnataka
  - location: Kodagu District, India
  - coordinates: 12.281612°N 75.550097°E
  - elevation: 1,315 m (4,314 ft)
- Mouth: Arabian Sea
  - location: Mattool/Azhikkal, Kerala, India
  - coordinates: 11°56′30″N 75°18′00″E
  - elevation: 0 m (0 ft)
- Length: 82 km (51 mi)

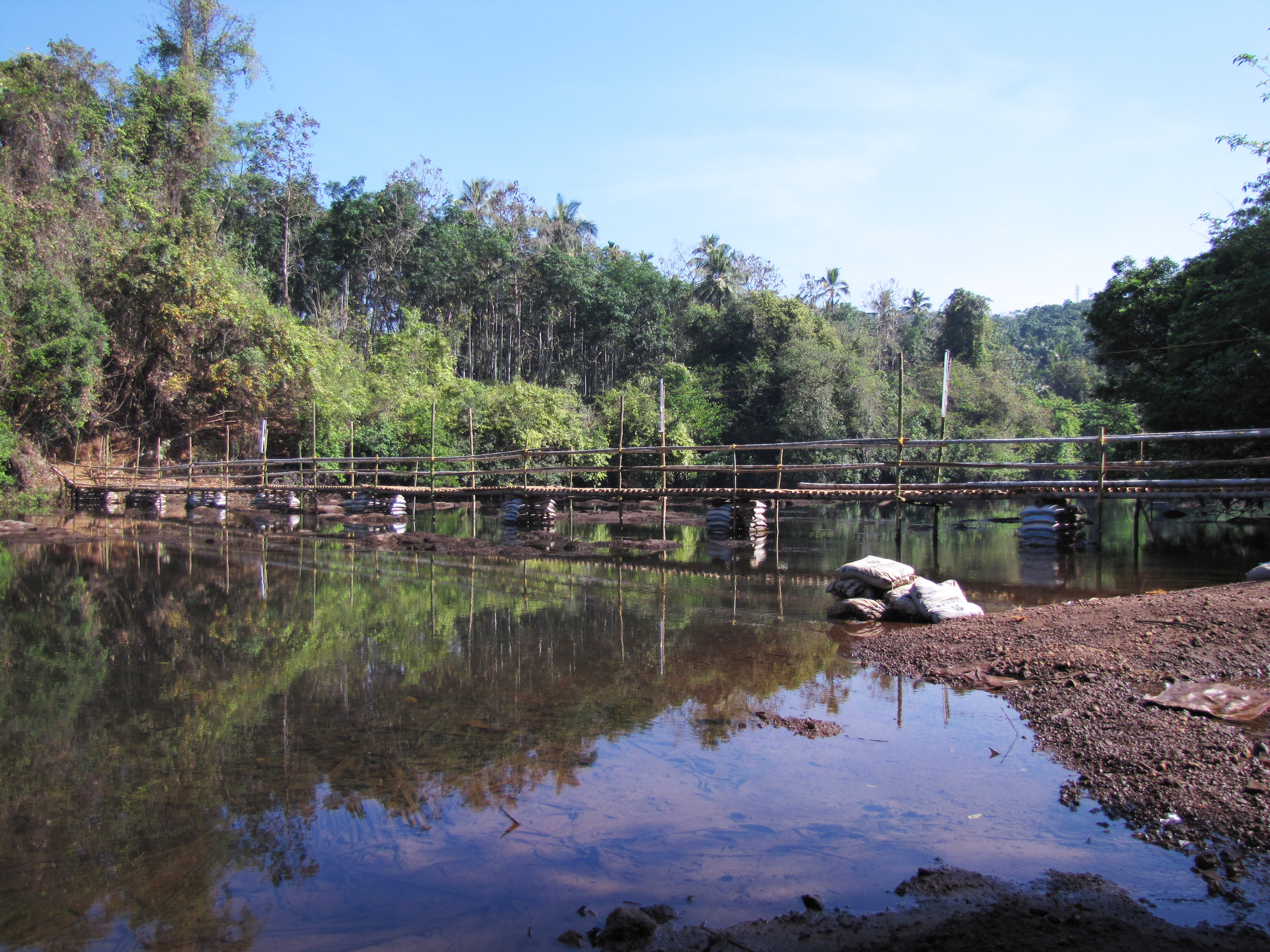
Kuppam river at Muchilottu

The Kuppam River is a river flowing mainly through the Kannur district of Kerala, with a small stretch in Karnataka. The total length of the river is about 82 km, of which about 70 km is in Kerala and 12 km in Karnataka. Kupam River is the second largest river in Kannur district after Valapattanam River.

== Course ==
The Kuppam River originates in the Brahmagiri Wildlife Sanctuary of Kodagu district, near the Kerala-Karnataka border. From its source it flows west through Taliparamba and Kannur taluks, passing Therandy, Cheriyoor, Pachheni, Iringal, Kuppam, Pattuvam, Payangadi, and Matool. It flows into the Lakshadweep Sea just north of Azhikkal, after meeting the Valapattanam River. The river is about 82 kilometres (51 mi) long, but it is only navigable for 24 kilometres (15 mi). The Kuppam flows for 12 kilometres (7.5 mi) in Karnataka, and for 70 kilometres (43 mi) in Kerala.

The river's largest tributary, which joins the Kuppam southwest of Pattuvam, is the Kuttikol River, which is 42 kilometres (26 mi) long. Other tributaries include the Chiriyathodu, Mukuttathodu, Alakuttathodu, and Pakkattupoya rivers.

== Basin ==
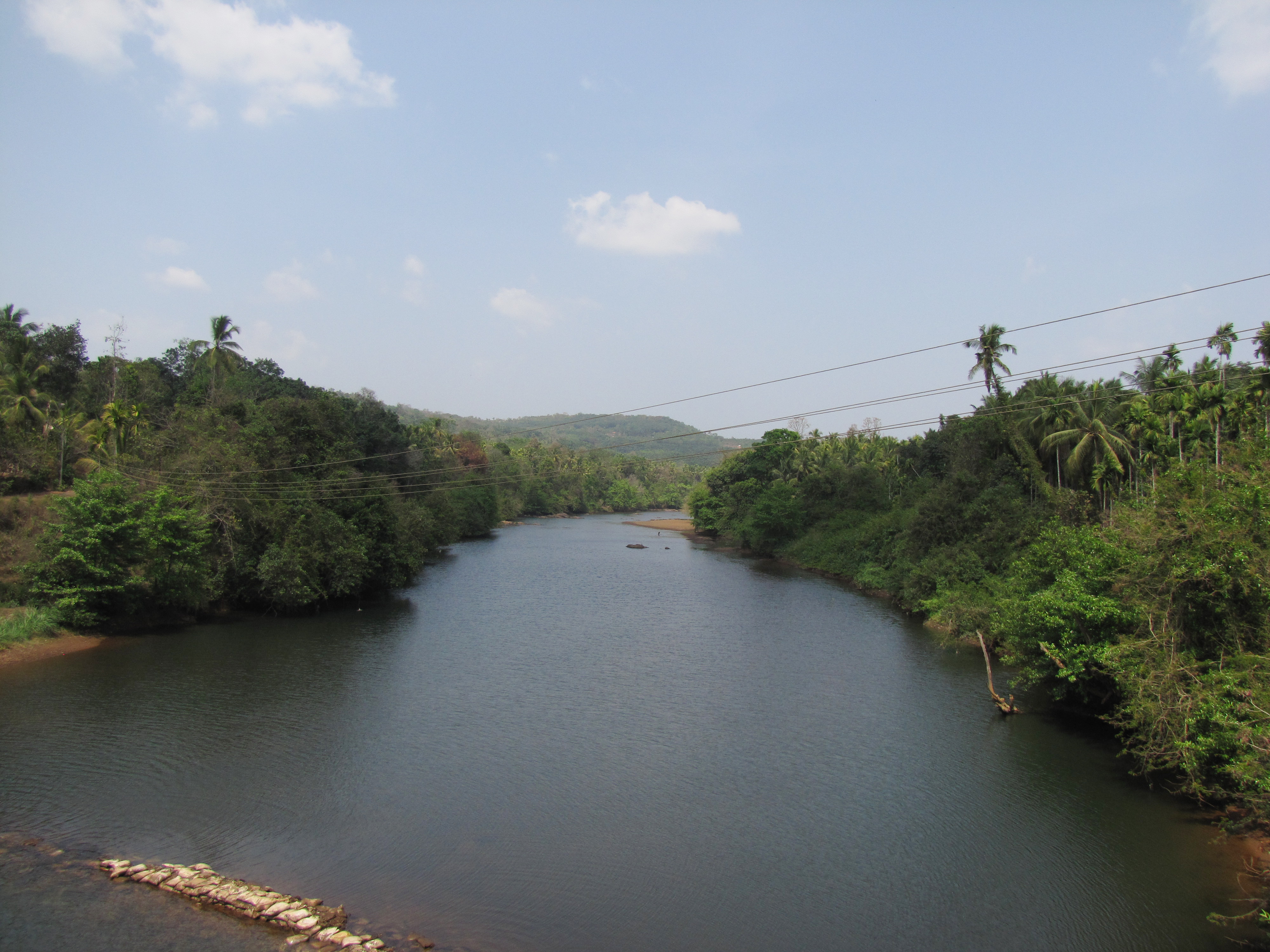
A view of the Kuppam River from the Kooveri Hanging Bridge

The drainage basin of the Kuppam River covers 539 square kilometres (208 sq mi) of land, of which 469 square kilometres (181 sq mi) are in Kerala, and 70 square kilometres (27 sq mi) are in Karnataka.

== Temples on Kuppam River ==
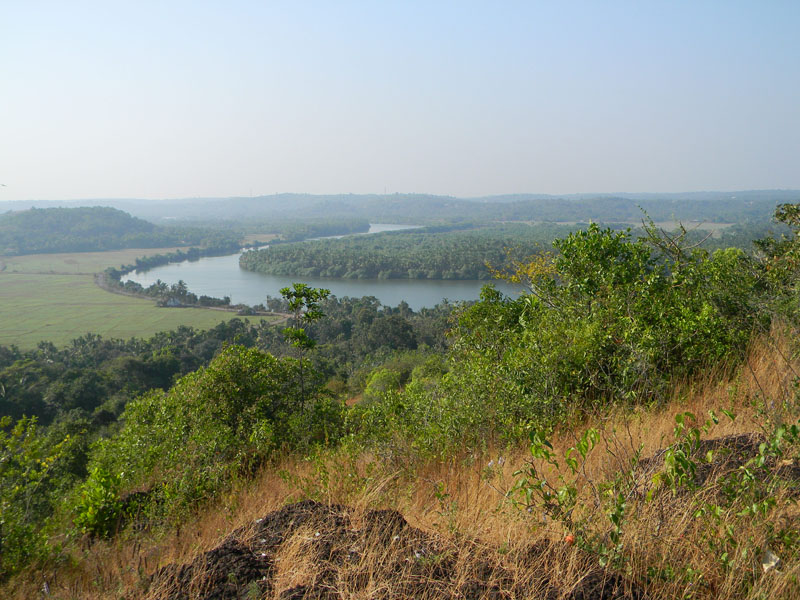
Kuppam river viewed from Mangalasseri hills

Religious sites on the Kuppam river include padavil Shree Muthappan Madapura, Vairyamkottam, Shree Perumbuzhayachan Temple, and two Juma mosques on either side of the river near the Kuppam Bridge.

== Bridges on Kuppam River ==
- NH 66 Kuppam Bridge
- Pazhayangadi Thavam overbridge
- Kooveri Hanging Bridge
- Eruvatty-Manikkal Hanging Bridge
- Odakkadav Hanging Bridge
- Mankara Bridge
- Kooveri-Kattampally Regulator-cum-Bridge

== See also ==
- Taliparamba West
- Taliparamba
- Vellavu
- Thiruvettoor
- Chapparapadavu
