= Vellavu =

Vellave Vellave
- Village
- Interactive map of Vellave
- Coordinates: 12°4′N 75°21′E
- Country: India
- State: Kerala
- District: Kannur

Languages
  - Official: Malayalam, English
- Time zone: UTC+5:30 (IST)
- PIN: 670 142
- Telephone code: +91 460
- ISO 3166 code: IN-KL
- Vehicle registration: KL-59, KL-13
- Climate: Tropical monsoon (Köppen)
- Avg. summer temperature: 33 °C (91 °F)
- Avg. winter temperature: 23 °C (73 °F)

Vellavu is a place in the Pariyaram gram panchayat of the Kannur District, state of Kerala, India.

== Location ==
Vellavu is situated on the bank of Vellavu river. (commonly known as Kuppam River). On the north it is bounded by Mavichery, on the south by Thalora, on the east by Nellipparamba, and on the west by Kuttiyeri. Ezhukunnu is a hill station on the bank of the Vellavu River. The Taliparamba Rajarajeswara temple, Thrichambaram Sreekrishna temple and Kanjirangad sree vaidyanatha temple are very near to this place. The villagers are mainly engaged in agricultural works.

== Important Landmarks ==
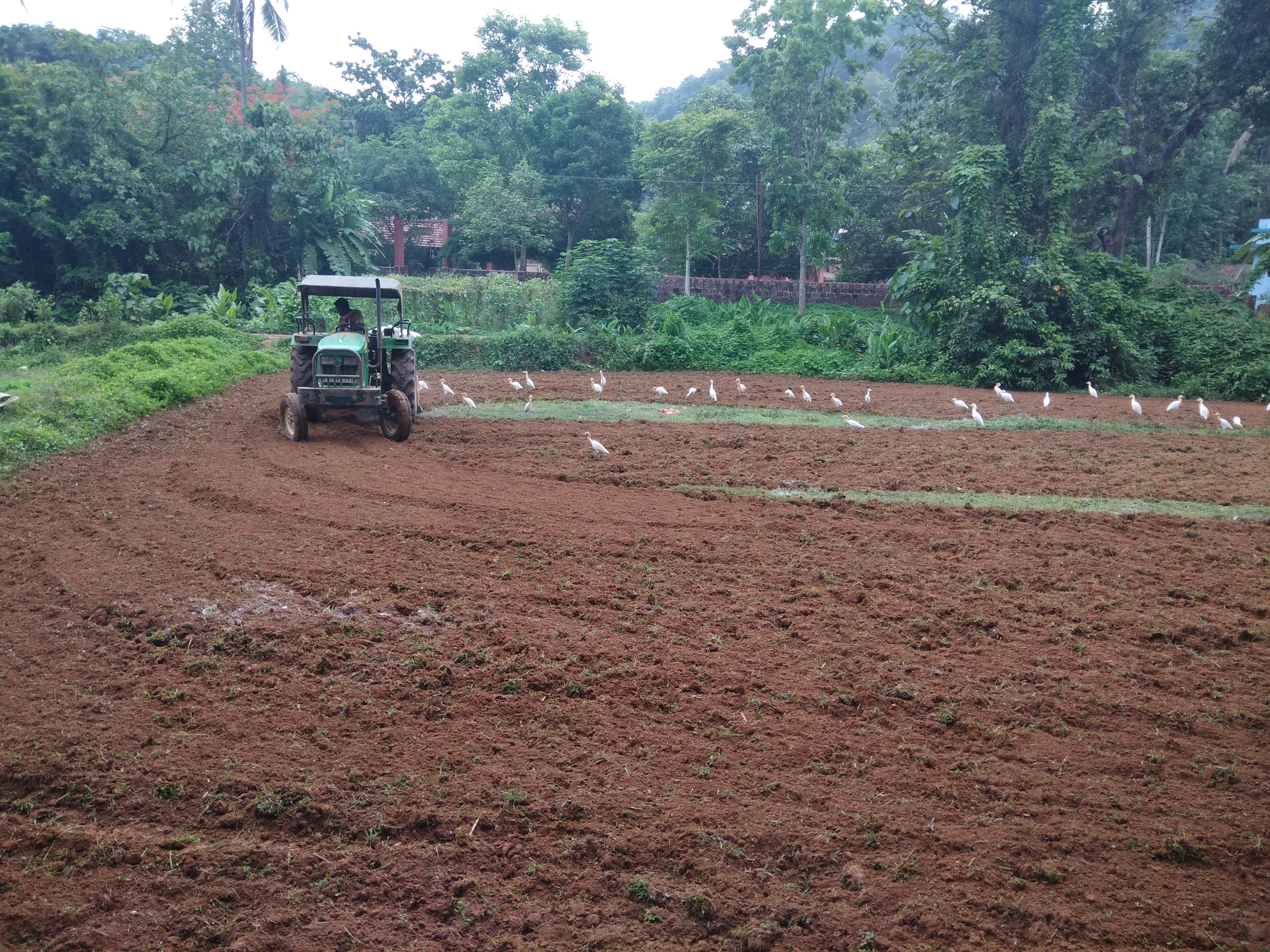
Paddy fields in Vellavu

- K K N Pariyaram Memorial Building (CPM Office)
- Vellavil Aided Lower Primary School
- Kuttyeri Service Co-operative Bank

This is one of the leading primary co-operative banks in Kannur having Four branches in and around Kuttyeri village.

- Kuttiyeri Post Office(670142)
- Sri Dakshinamoorthy Temple (Vellavu kavu)

One of the most ancient and biggest temples in north Kerala of Lord Dakshinamoorthy. The idol is called "Swayamboo".

- Sri Muchilottu Bhagagavathi Temple

Here the god is Muchilottu Bhagavathi. The main festival in this temple is 'Kaliyattam', which is celebrated in a period of 14 years. Last Kaliyattam was held in the year Feb 2002.

- Sri Kaithakeel Bhagavathi Temple

Here the god is Kaithakeel Amma. The main festival in this temple is 'Kaliyattam', which is celebrated once in a year.

- Red Star sports& arts club vellavu is one of the oldest of its kind in Kannur district.
- Vikas Reading Room - one of the best library in the village is also there.
- Kuttiyeri Veterinary hospital

It is the only veterinary hospital in pariyaram grama panchayath.

== Facilities ==
- Vellavu LP School (School Code: 13738)
- Kuttyeri Post office situated at Vellavu
- Pariyaram Panchayath Veterinary hospital, Vellavu
- NRHM Homeo dispensary, Vellavu
- Vellavu Samskarika Vayanasala & Grandhalayam
- Vellavu Aanganwadi
- Redstar Arts & Sports Club
- Kairali cultural centre
- Vikas Reading Room & library
- Taliparamba Arts & Science College situated at Chenayannur is at a distance of 3 Km from Vellavu
- Red Revengers vellavu
- sanghachethana thattummal

== Climate ==
- Summer – 27–33 °C (81–91 °F)
- Winter – 23–29 °C (73–84 °F)
- Rainfall: Like other places in Kerala (June to September)

== Transportation ==
The national highway passes through Taliparamba town. Goa and Mumbai can be accessed on the northern side and Cochin and Thiruvananthapuram can be accessed on the southern side. Neighbouring village of Pariyaram on the North side of kuppam river is accessible through kuttiyeri bridge. Taliparamba has a good bus station and buses are easily available to all parts of Kannur district. The road to the east of Iritty connects to Mysore and Bangalore. But buses to these cities are available only from Kannur, 22 km to the south. The nearest railway stations are Kannapuram and Kannur on Mangalore-Palakkad line. Trains are available to almost all parts of India subject to advance booking over the internet. There are airports at Kannur, Mangalore and Calicut. All of them are small international airports with direct flights available only to Middle Eastern countries.

Buses and taxis are available from Taliparamba town to reach Vellavu, and Balambika is an oldest and still continuing bus service to Vellavu.

== See also ==
- Kuppam
- Taliparamba
- Kuttiyeri
- Thiruvattoor
- Mukkunnu
