= Eruvatty =

- Village
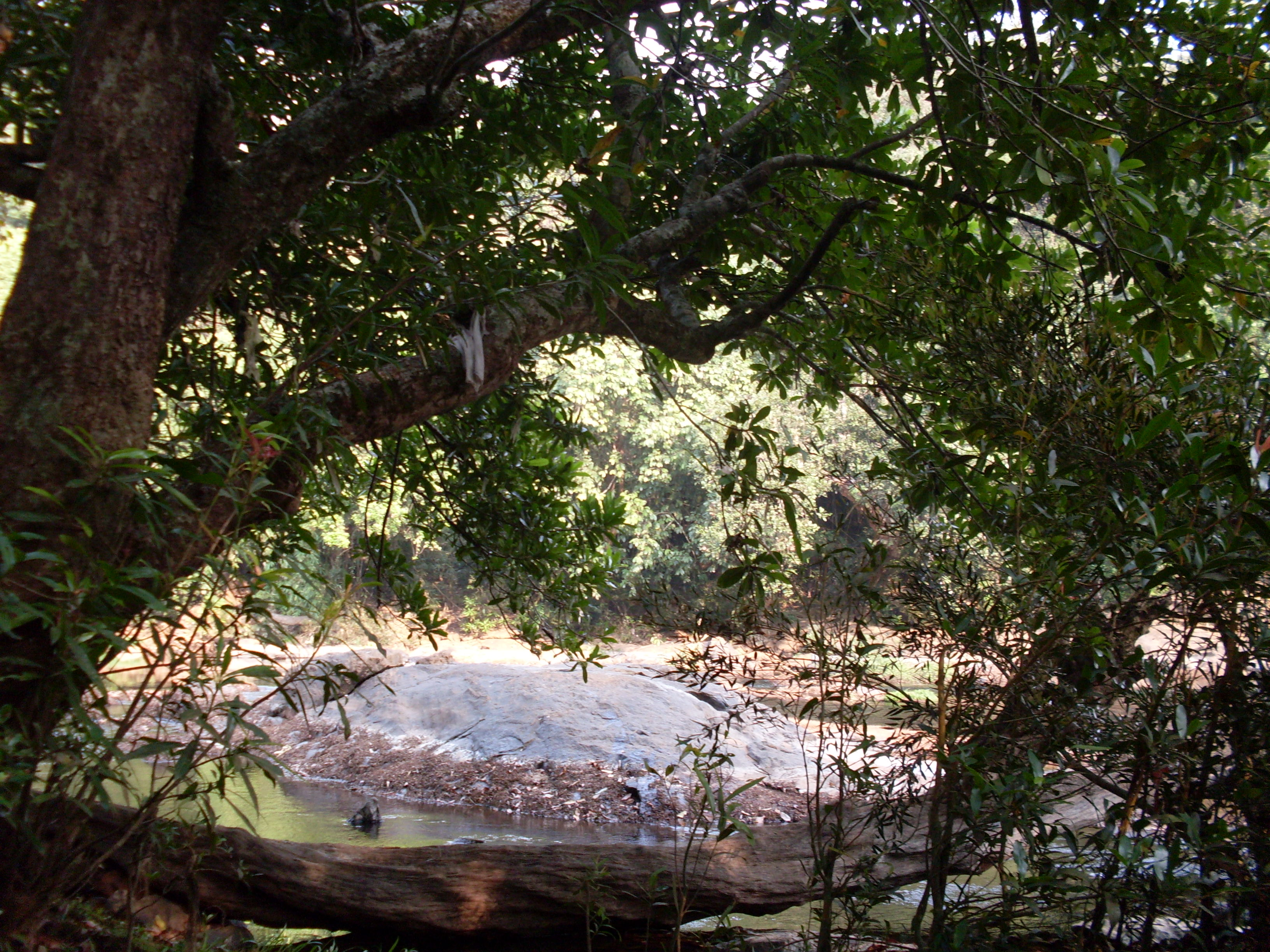
- Kuppam River at Eruvatty

- Location in Kerala, India Eruvatty (India)
- Coordinates: 12.184°N 75.411°E
- Country: India
- State: Kerala
- District: Kannur

Languages
  - Official: Malayalam, English
- Time zone: UTC+5:30 (IST)
- PIN: 670581
- Telephone code: 0460
- ISO 3166 code: IN-KL
- Vehicle registration: KL-58
- Nearest city: Thaliparamba
- Lok Sabha constituency: kannur

Eruvatty is a village in Kerala, India. It is in the district of Kannur.

== Geography ==
Eruvatty lies beside the river Kuppam. The river in this region is divided into seven branches, which is a destination for birds and biological hotspot of fish. One can travel to this place from Taliparamba, by bus. The village in Chapparapadava (or Chapparapadavu) Panchayat. The villages nearby are Nellipara, Vimalasheri, Thimiri, Talavial, Marigiri, Rayarom, Thadikadavu and others.

== Facilities ==
The village has a micro hydal power station The Postal Index Number (PIN) of this village is 670 581.

== Etymology ==
This Eruvatty (stress on eruvaatty) is different from the village which is pronounced as eruvatty (stress on eruvatty) in Pinarayi village.

== Transportation ==
The national highway passes through Taliparamba town. Goa and Mumbai can be accessed on the northern side and Cochin and Thiruvananthapuram can be accessed on the southern side. Taliparamba has a good bus station and buses are easily available to all parts of Kannur district. The road to the east of Iritty connects to Mysore and Bangalore. But buses to these cities are available only from Kannur, 22 km to the south. The nearest railway stations are Kannapuram and Kannur on Mangalore-Palakkad line. Trains are available to almost all parts of India subject to advance booking over the internet. There are airports at Kannur, Mangalore and Calicut. All of them are small international airports with direct flights available only to Middle Eastern countries.
