= Thiruvattoor =

Village in Kannur district, Kerala, India

Thiruvattoor is a village in Pariyaram Grama Panchayath of Kannur district, Kerala, India.

== Demographics ==
It has an area of 35 square kilometers and a population of 2000 (approx). Thiruvattoor is about 12 kilometers away from Taliparamba town.

== Temples ==
The Thiruvattoor Makham and Thiruvattoor Shiva Temple are famous religious symbols in and around the village. It is surrounded by hills on all sides, except the east where it shares a boundary with the Kuppam River.

== History ==
Thiruvattoor made history a hundred years ago when it used its autonomy to assert its sole right to the local biodiversity. The village consists of mini-villages such as Paroli, Vayad, Arippambra, Thotteekkal.

== Transportation ==
The national highway passes through Taliparamba town. Goa and Mumbai can be accessed on the northern side and Cochin and Thiruvananthapuram can be accessed on the southern side. Taliparamba has a good bus station and buses are easily available to all parts of Kannur district. The road to the east of Iritty connects to Mysore and Bangalore. But buses to these cities are available only from Kannur, 22 km to the south. The nearest railway stations are Kannapuram and Kannur on Mangalore-Palakkad line. Trains are available to almost all parts of India subject to advance booking over the internet. There are airports at Kannur, Mangalore and Calicut. All of them are small international airports with direct flights available only to Middle Eastern countries.

== See also ==
- Kuppam
- Taliparamba
- Narikode
- Iringal
- Vellavu
- Vayad
- Chapparapadavu
