= Karimbam, Taliparamba =

Velippara (വേളിപ്പാറ), Taliparamba, Kerala
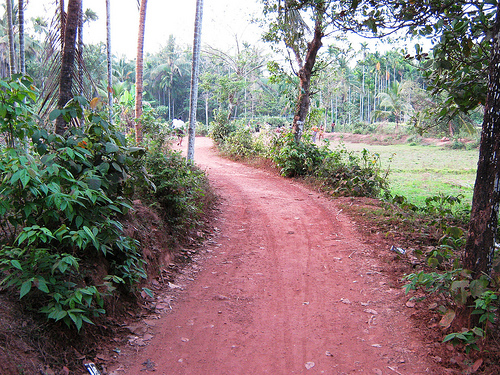
- Velippara footpath

- Location in Kerala, India
- Coordinates: 12°02′50″N 75°22′57″E
- Country: India
- State: Kerala
- District: Kannur
- Town: Taliparamba

Velippara is a village located in Taliparamba town in Kannur district in the Indian state of Kerala. It stretches from Government Hospital Karimbam to the neighboring villages of Panakkad and Varadool.

== Administration ==
Administratively, Velippara is part of both Kurumathur Grama Panchayat and Taliparamba Municipality.

== Biodiversity ==
Karimbam Farm, located near Velippara, has been a focal point for academic research in biodiversity. Botanists from various parts of the world have studied its ecosystem, contributing to a deeper understanding of the region's flora. Reflecting its ecological importance, the district local body published a handbook featuring photographs of 111 plant species found in Karimbam. The book was authored by the environmentalist Dr. K.M. Khaleel Chovva and botanist P. Sujanapal, offering insights into the area's botanical diversity. Additionally, South African scientist Sir Charles Alfred Barber resided at Karimbam while conducting a study of local plant species. His research contributed to the development of Flora of the Madras Presidency, a detailed botanical registry.

== Tourism ==
Several undulating hills surround the village. The surrounding villages of Panakkad, Varadool and Muyyam are filled with lush green fields.

Kerala government has proposed to develop Karimbam farm to be a tourist destination within the state.

== Major organizations ==
- KILA - Institute of Public Policy and Leadership
- Sir Syed College (Taliparamba)
- District Agricultural Farm, Taliparamba
- Keyi Sahib Training College
- Sir Syed Institute of Technology
- Government hospital
- KILA Centre for Organic Farming & Waste Management(Old ETC)

== Transportation ==
The national highway passes through Taliparamba town. Goa and Mumbai can be accessed on the northern side and Cochin and Thiruvananthapuram can be accessed on the southern side. Taliparamba has a bus station and buses are available to all parts of Kannur district. The road to the east of Iritty connects to Mysore and Bangalore. But buses to these cities are available only from Kannur, 22 km to the south. The nearest railway stations are Kannapuram and Kannur on Mangalore-Palakkad line. Trains are available to almost all parts of India. There are airports at Kannur, Mangalore and Calicut.

== Gallery ==
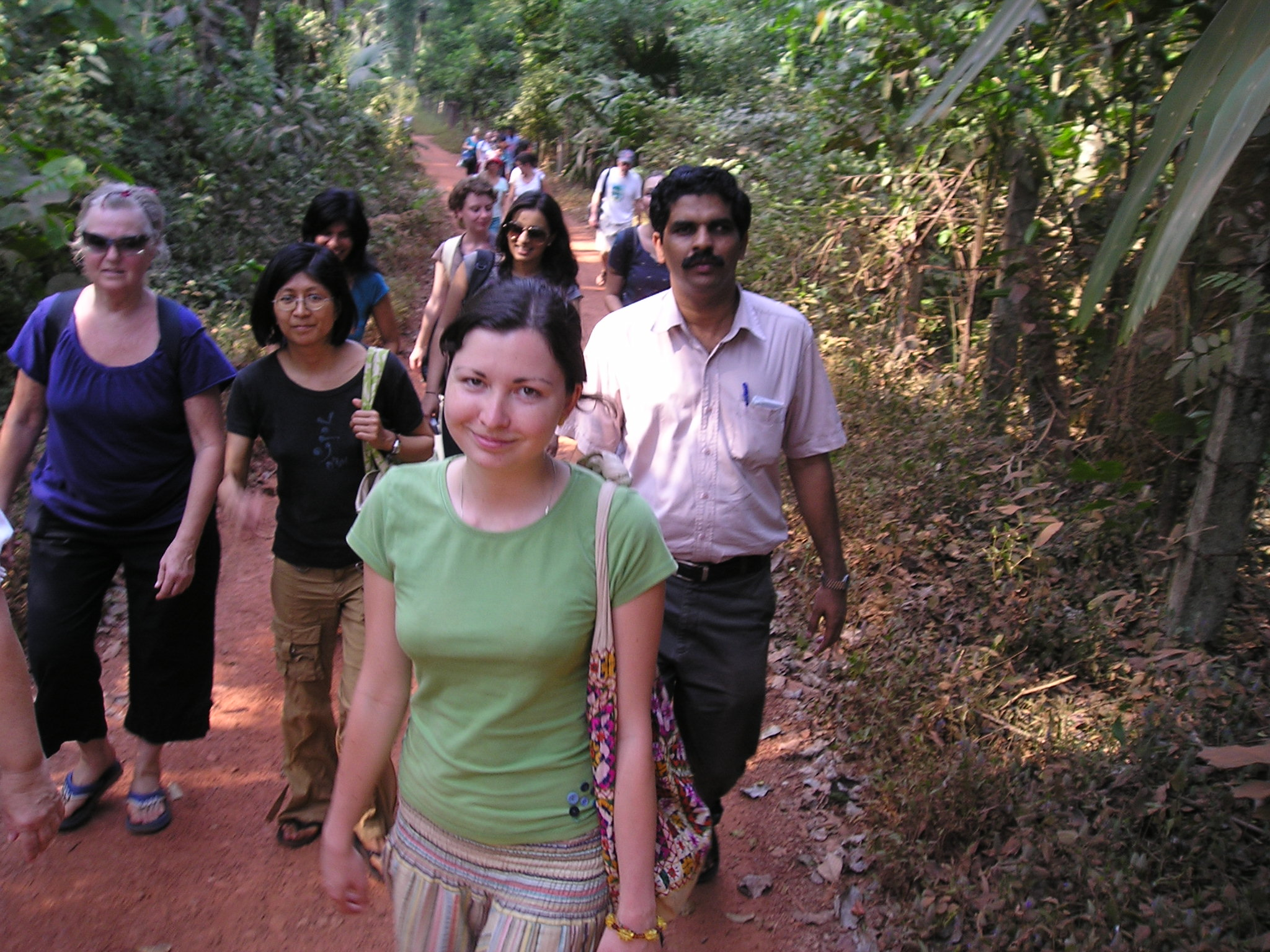
Visitors at Karimbam Farm

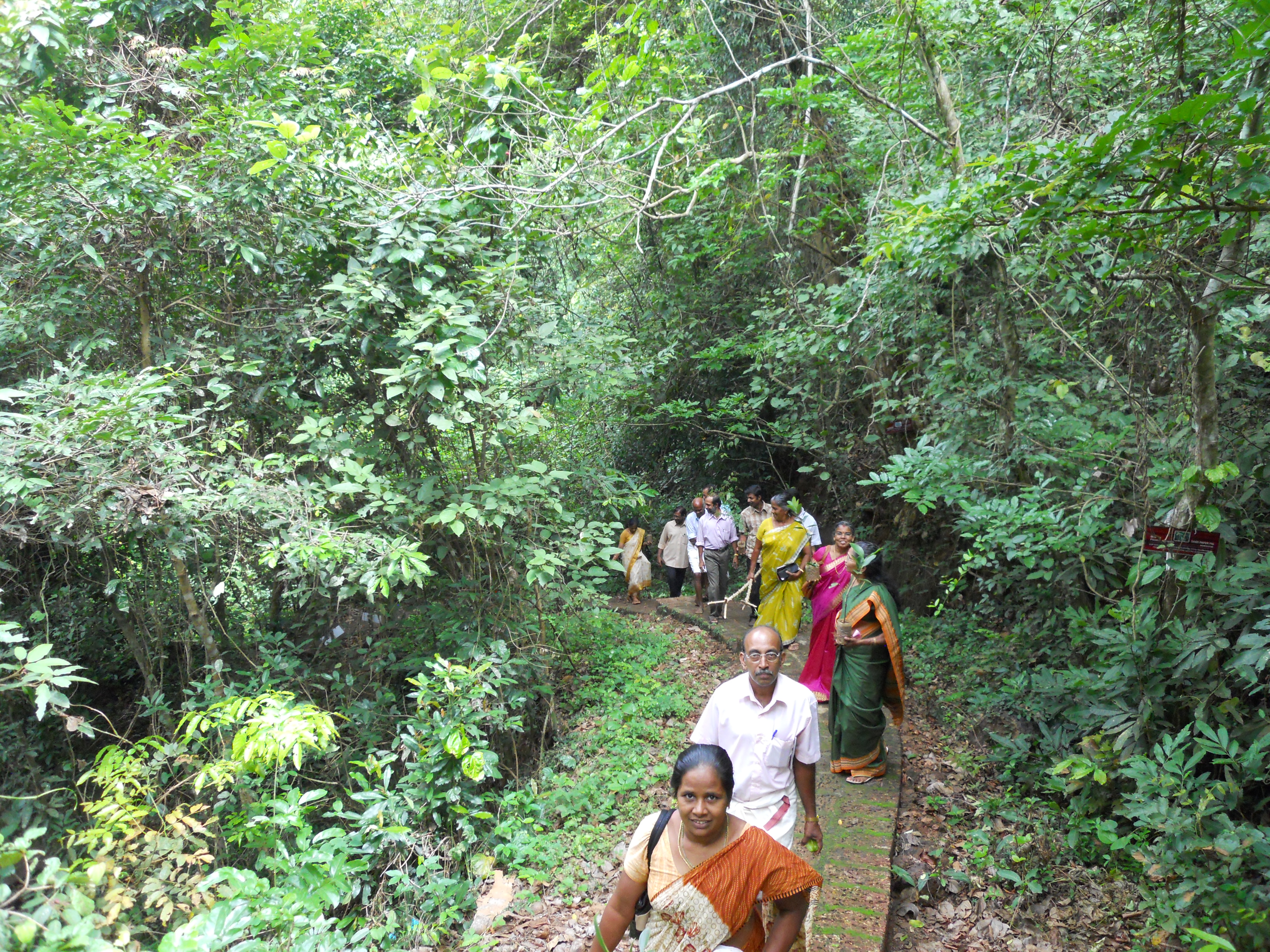
Karimbam Bio-diversity Center

== See also ==
- Muyyam
- Taliparamba
- Alakkode Road
- Taliparamba West
- Dharmashala, Kannur
- Cheppanool
