= Alakkode Road =

Suburb of Taliparamba in Kannur district, India

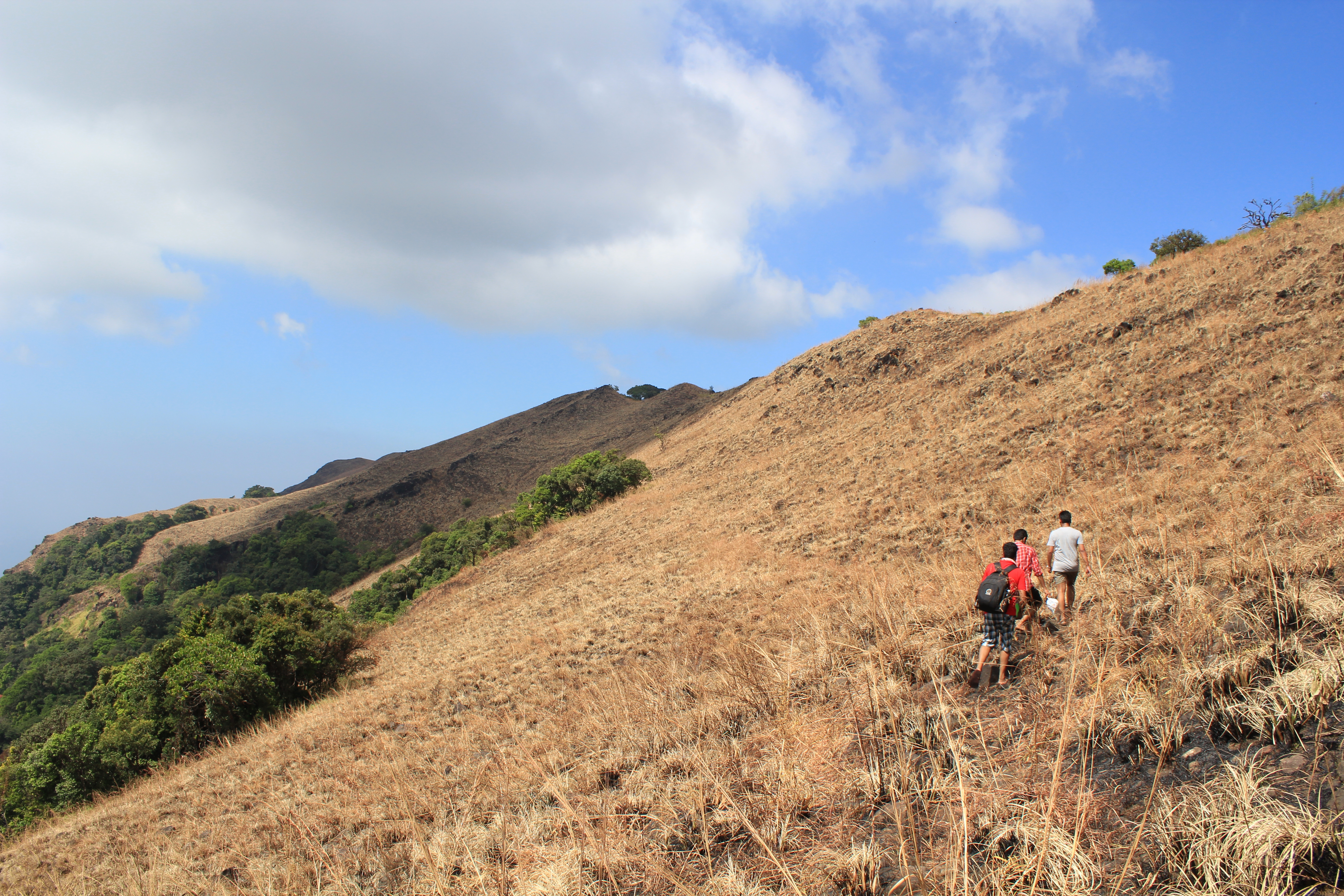
- Paithalmala hills
- Interactive map of Alakkode Road
- Coordinates: 12.0690347°N 75.3856087°E
- Country: India
- State: Kerala
- District: Kannur

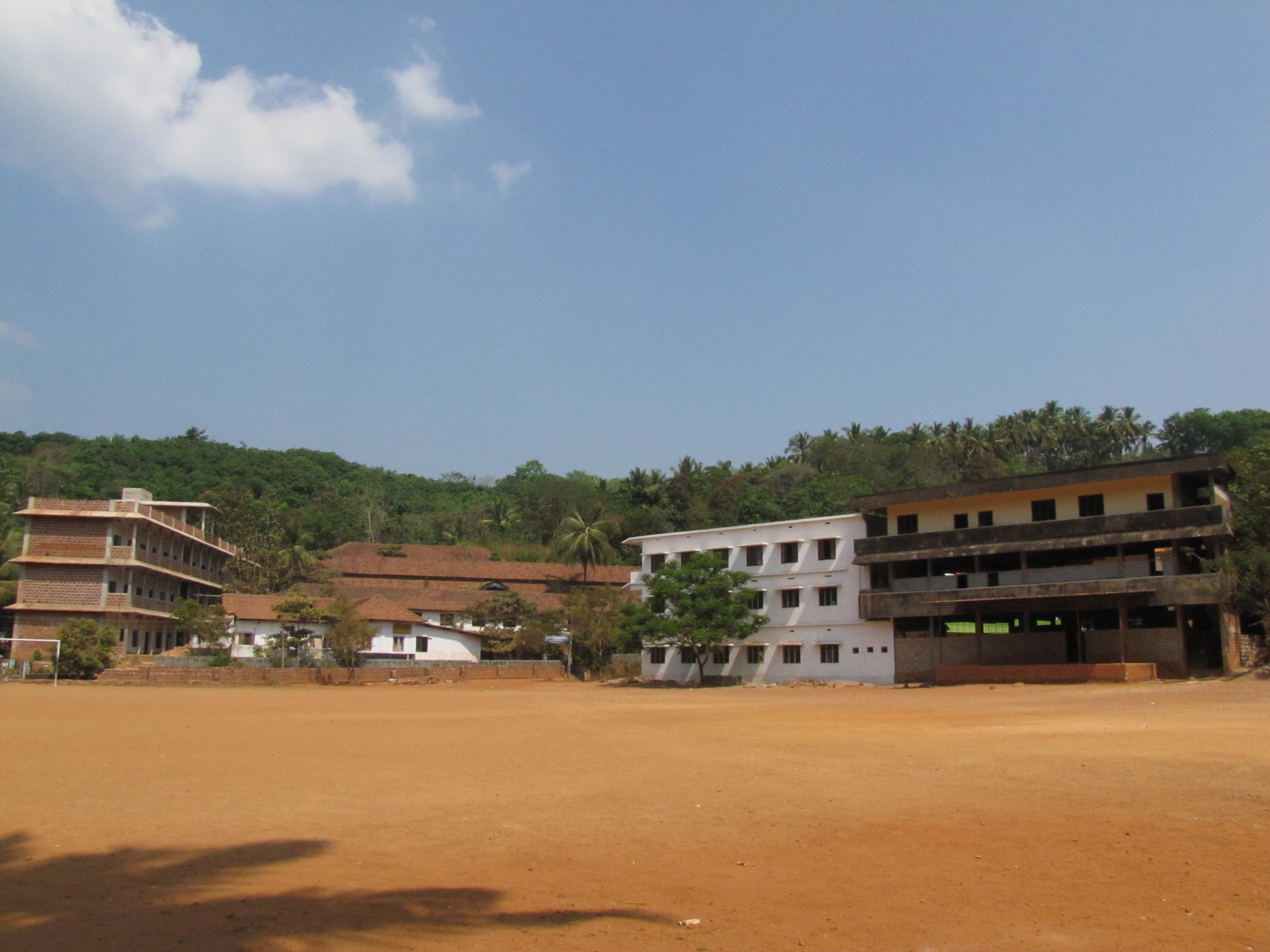
Chapparappadavu Highschool

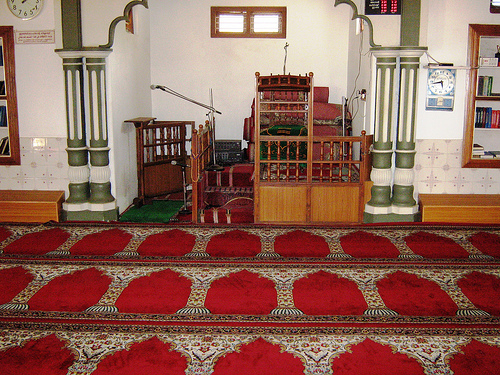
Syed Nagar Mosque

Alakkode Road is a suburb of Taliparamba town consisting a number of small and populated villages on the road to Alakode.

== Populated Villages ==
- Kooveri. 18,000 people
- Kuttiyeri. 10,528 people
- Panniyoor. 10,722 people
- Chapparapadavu 14,883 people
- Kanhirangad 5,000 people
- Alakode 33, 600 people
- Kooveri 17,908 people
- Eruvassy. 19,175 people

== Chapparapadavu ==
Chapparapadavu is a village (panchayath) in Kannur district in the Indian state of Kerala. The villages of Koovery, Kottakkanam, and Therandi are part of the panchayath. Chapparapadavu has 14,883 people.

== Image gallery ==
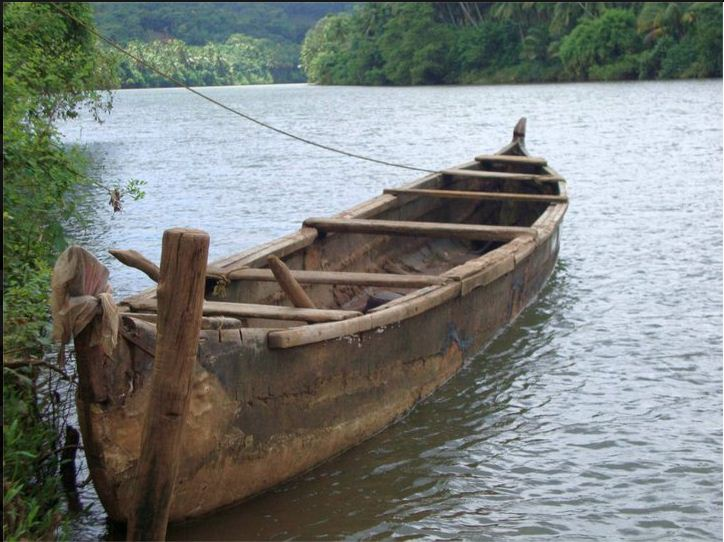
Boat at Cheriyoor

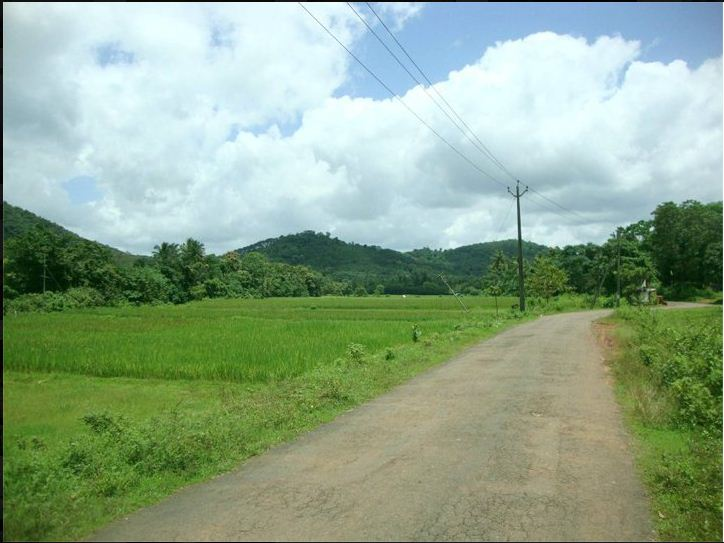
Cheriyoor village

== See also ==
- Dharmasala, Kannur
- Karimbam, Taliparamba
- Paithalmala
- Taliparamba
- Taliparamba West
