= Kinfra Textile Park Taliparamba =

Kinfra Park in Kerala

- Company type: Government owned
- Industry: Textile Park
- Headquarters: Taliparamba, Kannur, Kerala, India
- Area served: 125 Acres
- Owner: Kinfra, Government of Kerala

Kinfra Textile Park Taliparamba is a textile park situated in Nadukani, near to Taliparamba in Kannur district. The textile park was established by Kinfra to provide infrastructure and other related facilities for the textile industry. There are 50 companies in Nadukani Textile Park.

== Infrastructure & Facilities ==
- Uninterrupted Power supply
- Water supply
- Standard design Factory
- Communication Systems
- Hazardous waste disposal system
- Dyeing and winding plant
- Single window clearance system
