= Chuzhali =

- Village
- Location in Kerala, India Chuzhali (India)
- Coordinates: 12.0916400°N 75.441400°E
- Country: India
- State: Kerala
- District: Kannur

Area
  - Total: 46.19 km^{2} (17.83 sq mi)

Population (2011)
  - Total: 14,759
  - Density: 319.5/km^{2} (827.6/sq mi)

Languages
  - Official: Malayalam, English
- Time zone: UTC+5:30 (IST)
- PIN: 670142
- ISO 3166 code: IN-KL
- Vehicle registration: KL-59
- Nearest city: Taliparamba
- Vidhan Sabha constituency: Irikkur

Chuzhali is a village in the Kannur district of the Indian state of Kerala.

== History ==
The village is named after the goddess Chuzhali, as it is the abode of Chuzhali (Durga). The village was under the dynasty of Chuzhali Nambiars. In ancient times it was under Chuzhali Swaroopam and the boundary was Koorgu in Karnataka.

In Malabar manual, William Logan mentioned Chuzhali as an ideal place for guerilla war, since the main land of Chuzhali is surrounded by high altitude areas, namely Kulathur, Thalakkulam, Edakkulm and Kuunam. Chuzhali Nambiar was one of the commanders of Pazhashiraja's guerilla army. It is said that Pazhashiraja visited Chuzhali during his struggle against the British army. Chuzhali Nambiar was caught by the British army and hanged at Thalassery.

== Temples ==
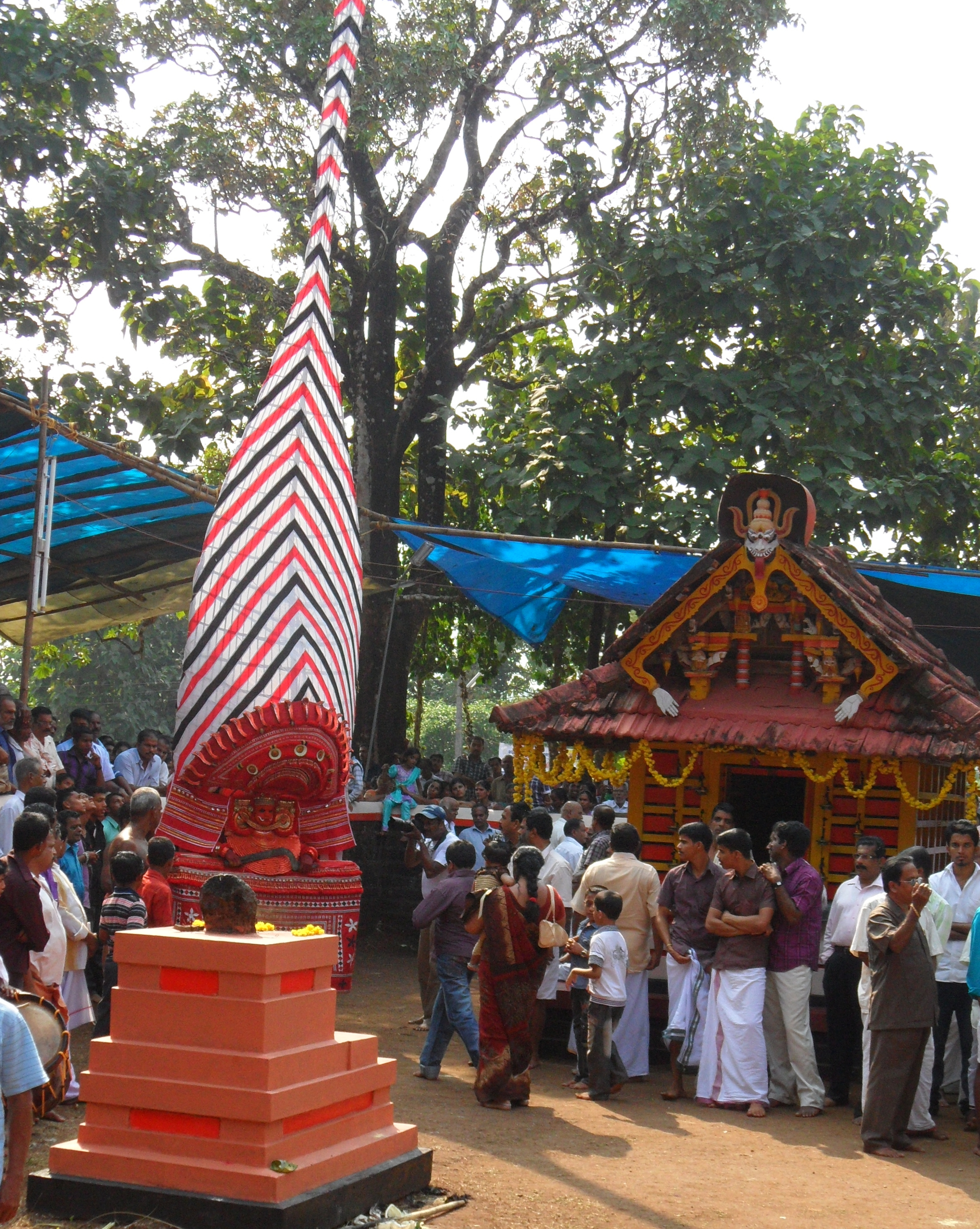
Chuzhali Bhagavathy temple

Chuzhali Bhagavathi is a famous temple situated in the middle of the village. The annual festival of this temple takes place during March–April. It is treated by the people of Chuzhali as their village festival. The main attraction near the village is Kulathur, 3 km from the main town of Chalilvayal.

Another famous temple in Chuzhali is Thiruvambadi, dedicated to Lord Sreekrishna. Other temples are Muchilottu Bhagavathi, Aranoor Sastha Bhagavathi, Sree Muthappan Madapura Chuzhali, Kathivanoor Veeran Kshektram Vadakkemoola and Puthiya Bhagavathi Kshethram Mamalathkari.

== Demographics ==
As of 2011 Census, Chuzhali had a population of 14,759 which constitutes 7,147 (48.4%) males and 7,612 (51.6%) females. Chuzhali village has an area of 46.19 km^{2} (17.83 sq mi) with 3,449 families residing in it. The male female sex ratio was 1,065 lower than state average of 1,084. In Chuzhali, 11.2% of the population was under 6 years of age. Chuzhali had overall literacy of 93.77%, higher than the national average of 75% and lower than the state average of 94.00%.

== Transportation ==
The national highway passes through Taliparamba town. Goa and Mumbai can be accessed to the north and Cochin and Thiruvananthapuram to the south. Taliparamba has a bus station and buses are available to all parts of Kannur district. The road to the east of Iritty connects to Mysore and Bangalore. Buses to these cities are available only from Kannur, 22 km to the south. The nearest railway stations are Kannapuram and Kannur on the Mangalore-Palakkad line.

Trains are available to almost all parts of India. There are airports at Kannur, Mangalore and Calicut. All are small international airports with direct flights available only to Middle Eastern countries.
