= Cheleri =

- Census Town
- Location in Kerala, India Cheleri (India)
- Coordinates: 11.9599000°N 75.414740°E
- Country: India
- State: Kerala
- District: Kannur

Government
  - Body: Kolachery Grama Panchayat

Area
  - Total: 8.56 km^{2} (3.31 sq mi)

Population (2011)
  - Total: 10,848
  - Density: 1,270/km^{2} (3,280/sq mi)

Languages
  - Official: Malayalam, English
- Time zone: UTC+5:30 (IST)
- PIN: 670604
- ISO 3166 code: IN-KL
- Nearest city: Kannur
- Lok Sabha constituency: Kannur
- Vidhan Sabha constituency: Taliparamba

Cheleri is a census town in Kannur district in the Indian state of Kerala.

== Demographics ==
As of 2011 Census, Cheleri had a population of 10,848 with 4,873 males and 5,975 females. Cheleri census town spreads over an area of 8.56 km^{2} with 2,150 families residing in it. The sex ratio was 1,226 higher than state average of 1,084. In Cheleri, population of children under 6 years was 12.76%. Cheleri had overall literacy of 94%, higher than national average of 59% and same as state average of 94%.

== Religion ==
As of 2011 India census, Cheleri census town had total population of 10,848 which constitute 45.6% Hindus, 53.9% Muslims and 0.5% others.

== Administration ==
Cheleri census town is situated in Kolachery Grama Panchayat. It includes localities like Karayapa, Kayyankode, Munderikkadavu, Cheleri Mukkil, Nonheri, Dalil palli, Kappanapparamba, Kayachira, Vaidyar Kandi, Valavil Cheleri etc.

== Education ==
There are two U.P. schools in this village: Cheleri A.U.P. School and Noorul Islam Madrassa U.P. School. The first one is the government-aided. The second one does not receive aid from the government but is recognized by the government. There is only one government school in this village. It is Cheleri Govt. Mopla L.P. School. Cheleri Mopla A.L.P. School, Noonheri A.L.P. School, Karayappa A.L.P. School, and Malot A L.P. School are other schools in this village.

== Transportation ==
The national highway passes through Valapattanam town. Goa and Mumbai can be accessed on the northern side and Cochin and Thiruvananthapuram can be accessed on the southern side. The road to the east of Iritty connects to Mysore and Bangalore. The nearest railway station is Kannur on Mangalore-Palakkad line. Trains are available to almost all parts of India subject to booking over the internet. There are airports at Mattanur, Mangalore and Calicut. All of them are international airports but direct flights are available only to Middle Eastern countries.
