= Taliparamba West =

- suburb
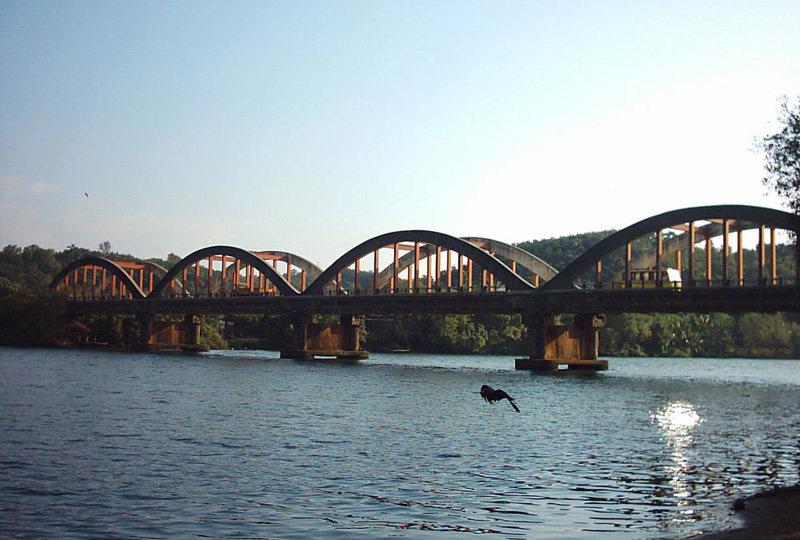
- The historic Kuppam Bridge
- Interactive map of Taliparamba West
- Coordinates: 12.049687°N 75.347414°E
- Country: India
- State: Kerala
- District: Kannur

Languages
  - Official: Malayalam, English
- Time zone: UTC+5:30 (IST)
- ISO 3166 code: IN-KL
- Vehicle registration: KL-59
- Nearest city: Taliparamba
- Lok Sabha constituency: Kasargode

Taliparamba West is a group of suburbs and villages on the north and west of Taliparamba town, Kerala state, India.

The locality is divided into two parts, south and north; South Kuppam is a part of Taliparamba municipality while North Kuppam, near Mukkunnu, is a part of Pariyaram village Panchayath.

During the 1960s and 1970s this village was a commercial center of spices. The National Highway-17 passes through Kuppam.

A Gothic style St. Mary's Forane Church is located at Taliparamba within 22 kilometers off Kannur district. The artistic church, along with the 25-feet long Mother Mary painting, is one of the tourist attractions in the area.

== Suburbs and villages ==
- Narikode, Muthukuda and Ezhome
- Pattuvam, Cherukunnu and Pazhayangadi
- Kadannappally, Kuttiyeri, Pariyaram and Pilathara

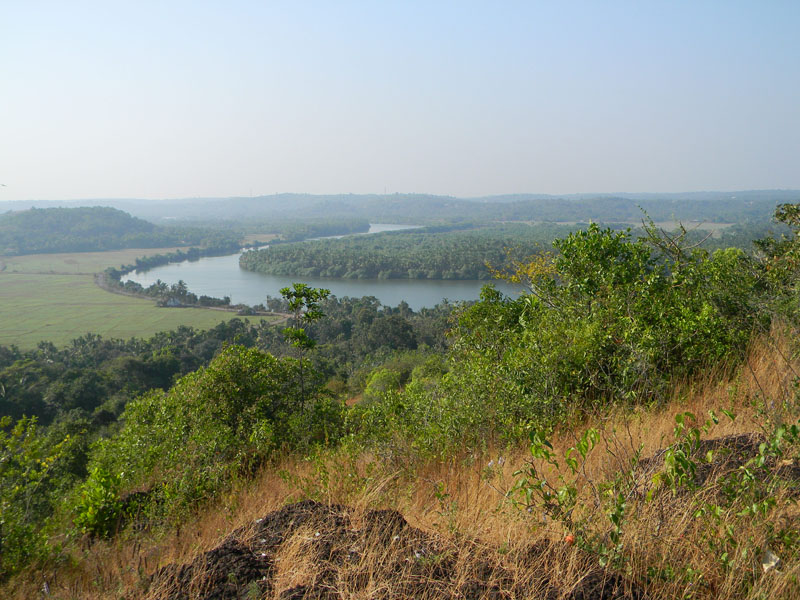
Kuppam river from the Mangalasssery Hills

== Kuppam River ==
Kuppam got its name from the Kuppam River, one of the 44 Rivers of Kerala, which originates from the hilly area of western Karnataka and flows into the Arabian Sea.

Once, waterways in the Kuppam River were the only mode of travel into the hilly areas of Kannur district. But since the construction of Kuppam Bridge, passenger boats have almost disappeared. The Kuppam Bridge was built in 1958 with British construction methods, which consists of five huge arches each side. The bridge is attractive for its construction style. A new bridge at Kuttiyeri Kadavu, connecting Kuttiyeri and Pariyaram opened in 2015.

== See also ==
- Kuppam River
- Taliparamba
- Narikode
- Iringal
- Vellavu
- Vayad
- Thiruvettoor
- Chapparapadavu

== Image gallery ==
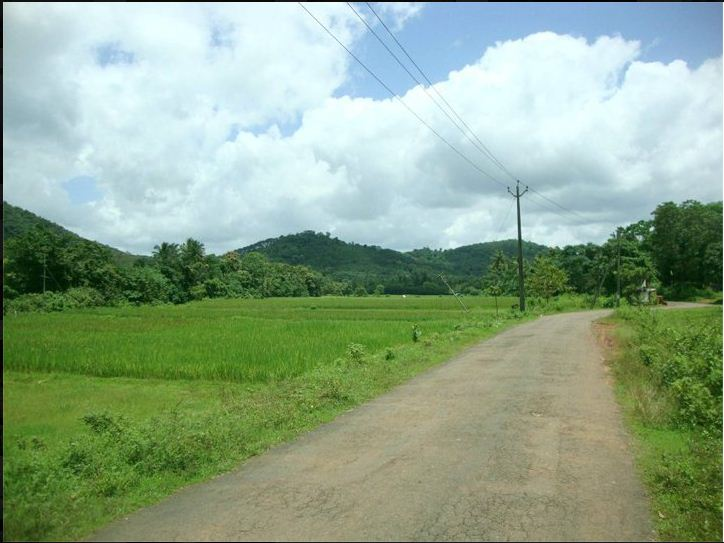
Cheriyoor

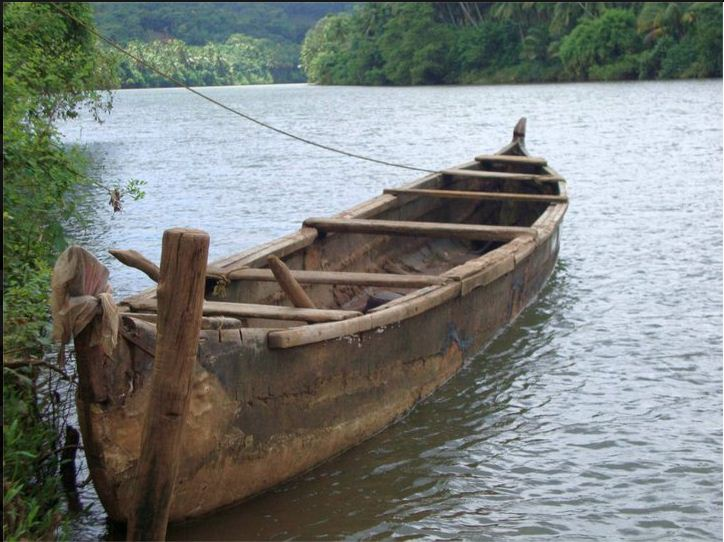
Cheriyoor jetty

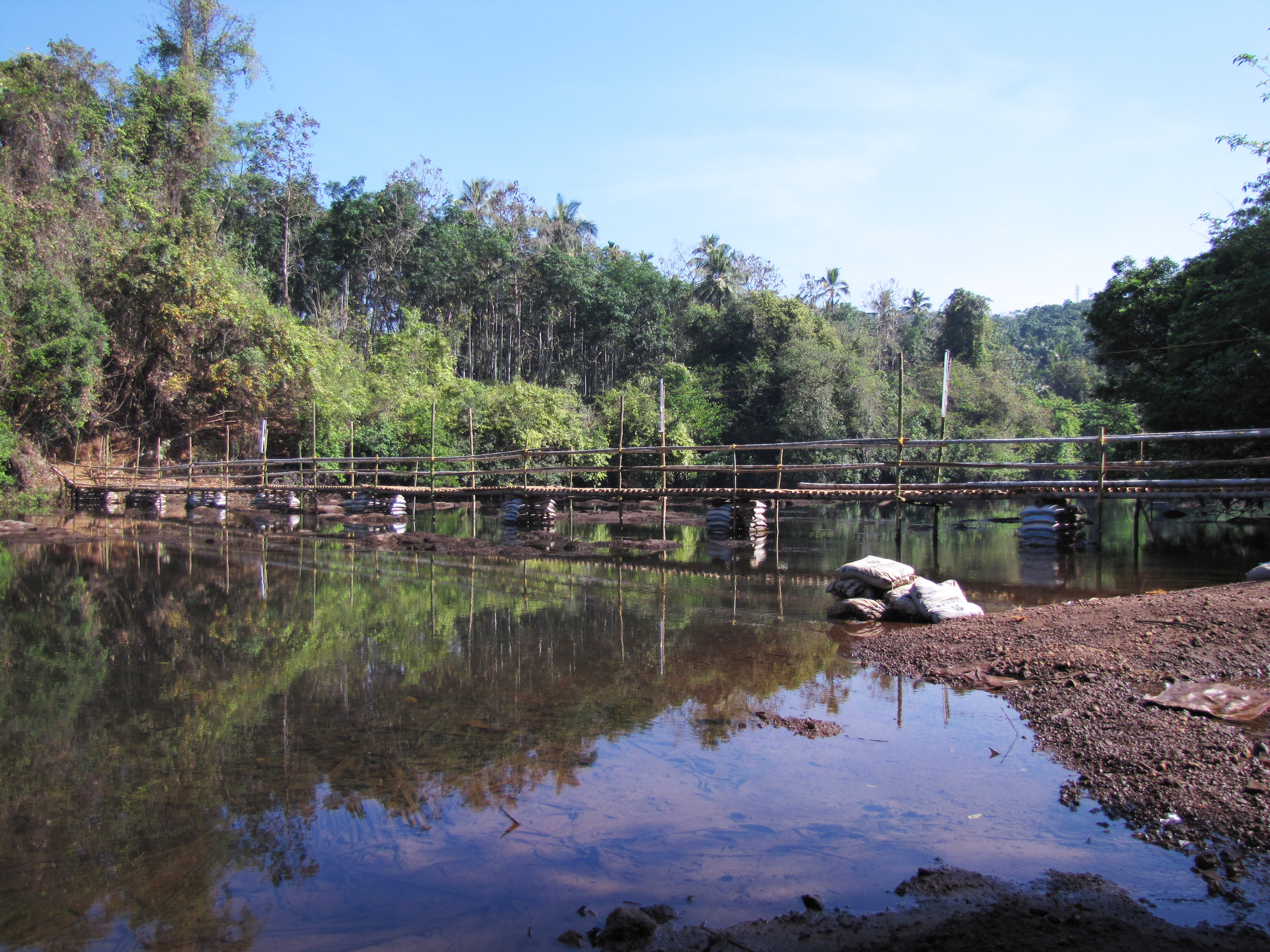
Kuppam river

== See also ==
- Taliparamba
- Pattuvam
- Ezhom
- Pariyaram
- Pilathara
- Pazhayangadi
