= Chalode =

Town in Kannur, Kerala, India

Chalode is a small junction town developing in Kannur, Kerala state, India.

== Location ==
Chalode is between Kannur, Mattannur, and Irikkur.

== History ==
During ancient times it was the centre of travelling to Coorg, Mayyil, Irikkur, Anjarakkandy.

== Etymology ==
The name of the town derived from charroads by North Indian military forces. It was a military center, collector's camp, etc. Now there is a bus stand. Chalode was famous for black laterite stone.

== Transportation ==
The national highway passes through Kannur town. Goa and Mumbai can be accessed on the northern side and Cochin and Thiruvananthapuram can be accessed on the southern side. The road to the east of Iritty connects to Mysore, Bangalore, Virajpet, Irikkur, Sreekandapuram, Mayyil, and Kuttiyattoor. The nearest railway station is Kannur on Mangalore-Palakkad line. Trains are available to almost all parts of India, subject to advance booking over the internet. There are airports at Mattanur, Mangalore and Calicut. All of them are international airports, but direct flights are available only to Middle Eastern countries.
