= District Agricultural Farm, Taliparamba =

Farm in Karimbam, India

The District Agricultural Farm in Taliparamba is one of the oldest farms in India. It is located at Karimbam village on State Highway 36 in Kannur district of Kerala State in India. Kerala government has proposed to develop Karimbam farm to be a tourist spot in the state.

== History ==
This farm was originally started in 1905 by Sir Charles Alfred Barber at the behest of the Madras Government, based on the recommendation of the Famine Commission of 1880 of Government of India. Although the objective was to do research on pepper, the activities of the farm were further extended to agroclimatic experiments, hybridization and production and distribution of seeds and seedlings. Covering an area of 56 hectares, the farm has a rich biodiversity with a variety of indigenous and exotic fruit trees (such as Mangosteen, Rambutan, and Durian), spices and medicinal plants.

The lush greenery with its array of crops such as Coconut, Areca nut, Cashew, Mango, Sapota, Jack, Coffee, Cocoa, Nutmeg, Clove and Pepper and the adjoining paddy field attracts many nature lovers and environmentalists to the farm. Recognizing the importance of the flora and fauna of the station, Kannur District Panchayat has established a ‘Biodiversity Centre’ and an ‘Indigenous Technology Knowledge Centre’ at the farm in 2005. Thousands of students, researchers, teachers and the general public from all over the state and the neighboring states make use of the facilities of the farm to improve and update their knowledge through study visits every year.

The farm produces over 62 varieties of mango. With a collection of varieties from all over India, the farm has produced four hybrid varieties of mango namely, H 45, H 56, H 87 and H 151. The farm participates at fruit and vegetable exhibitions conducted in Kannur and the neighboring districts of Kasargod and Kozhikkode. Benganappally, Alampur Banishan, Neelam, Alphonso, Kalapady, Himayudheen, Jahangir, Chinnarasa, Panjarakalasa, Priyori and Malgoa are among the popular varieties of Mango grown and multiplied in this farm.

The farm produces and distributes to the local community rooted pepper cuttings, cashew grafts, grafts of mango, sapota, mangosteen and nutmeg, seedlings of fruit crops and spices, seedlings of arecanut, paddy seeds, vegetable seeds, banana and tuber crops (such as ginger, turmeric and yam.

== See also ==
- Charles Alfred Barber
- Great Famine of 1876–78
