= Panniyoor =

- village
- Location in Kerala, India Panniyoor (India)
- Coordinates: 12.099780°N 75.403430°E
- Country: India
- State: Kerala
- District: Kannur

Area
  - Total: 24.54 km^{2} (9.47 sq mi)

Population (2011)
  - Total: 12,383
  - Density: 504.6/km^{2} (1,307/sq mi)

Languages
  - Official: Malayalam, English
- Time zone: UTC+5:30 (IST)
- PIN: 670142
- ISO 3166 code: IN-KL
- Vehicle registration: KL-59

Panniyoor is a village in Kannur district in the Indian state of Kerala.

== Demographics ==
As of 2011 Census, Panniyoor had a population of 12,382 with 5,932 (47.9%) males and 6,450 (52.1%) females. Panniyoor village spreads over an area of 24.54 km^{2} (9.47 sq mi) with 2,673 families residing in it. The male female sex ratio was 1,087 higher than state average of 1,084. In Panniyoor, 11% of the population were under 6 years age. Panniyoor had overall literacy of 91.8% lower than state average of 94%.

== Pepper Research Station ==
Panniyoor One pepper

Panniyoor has become famous because the prestigious pepper reserearch station of Kerala Agricultural University is located there. The station has developed a high yield hybrid pepper variety called Panniyoor One.

== Transportation ==
The national highway passes through Taliparamba town. Goa and Mumbai can be accessed on the northern side and Cochin and Thiruvananthapuram can be accessed on the southern side. Taliparamba has a good bus station and buses are easily available to all parts of Kannur district. The road to the east of Iritty connects to Mysore and Bangalore but buses to these cities are available only from Kannur, 22 km to the south. The nearest railway stations are Kannapuram and Kannur on Mangalore-Palakkad line. Trains are available to almost all parts of India. There are airports at Kannur, Mangalore and Calicut. All of them are small international airports with direct flights available only to Middle Eastern countries.
