= Pattuvam =

- village
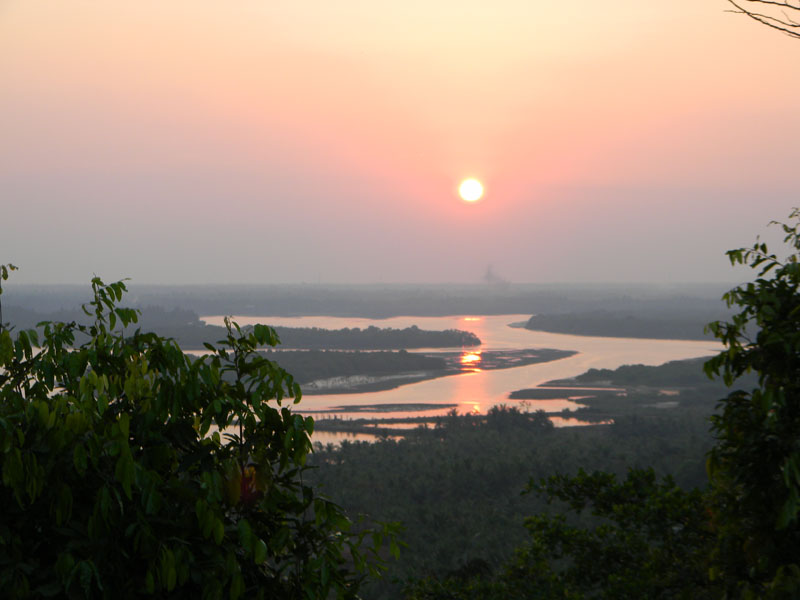
- Sunset viewed from a hill near Pattuvam U.P school.

- Location in Kerala, India Pattuvam (India)
- Coordinates: 12.039290°N 75.321110°E
- Country: India
- State: Kerala
- District: Kannur

Area
  - Total: 16.18 km^{2} (6.25 sq mi)

Population (2011)
  - Total: 15,659
  - Density: 967.8/km^{2} (2,507/sq mi)

Languages
  - Official: Malayalam, English
- Time zone: UTC+5:30 (IST)
- PIN: 670143
- Telephone code: +914602
- ISO 3166 code: IN-KL
- Vehicle registration: KL-59
- Lok Sabha constituency: Kasaragod
- Legislative Assembly constituency: Kalliasseri

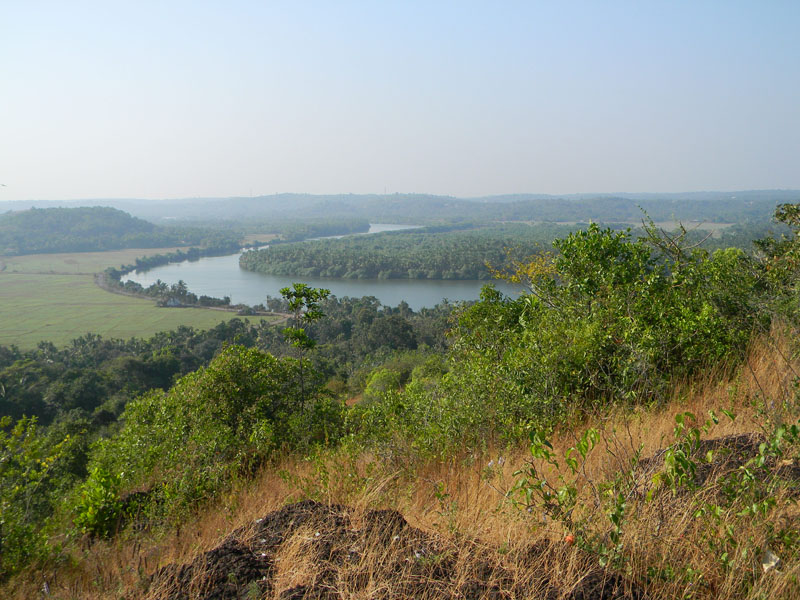
Pattuvam river seen from Mangalassery

Pattuvam is a village in Kannur district in the Indian state of Kerala. It is bordered by the Kuppam river on the north, west and south (known locally as Pattuvam river). It shares a border with Taliparamba municipality on the east. A bridge over the river connects Pattuvam to Kottakkeel of Ezhome village in the northwest.

== Demographics ==
As of the 2011 Census, Pattuvam village had a population of 15,659 of which 7,214 are male and 8,445 are female. The number of children between the ages of 1 and 6 is 1,813, making up 11.6% of the total. The average sex ratio was 1171, which is higher than the Kerala state average of 1084. The child sex ratio is 962, lower than the Kerala average of 964. It has a lower literacy rate compared to Kerala, reaching 91.04%, compared to Kerala's 94%. The male literacy stands at 96.2% while the female literacy rate is 86.8%.

== Geography ==
Surrounded by the river on all sides except the east, where it shares a boundary with Taliparamba, Pattuvam has rich biodiversity. Pattuvam made history in the 2010s when it used its autonomy to assert its right to protect local biodiversity.

The Panchayat consists of mini-villages including Mangalasseri, Muthukuda, kavungal, Pattuvam, Muriyathode, Mullool, Ariyil, Kunnaru, Parappool, and Vellikkeel.

== Governance ==
The panchayat is ruled by the left front led by President Miss Sreemathi.P.

== Temples ==
Vadakke Kavu (Panchuruli Temple), Kunhimathilam Temple, Valiyamathilakam Temple, Karayapath Kathivanoor Veeran Temple, Cheriyamrambu Sree Narasimha Murthy Temple, Muthukuda Siva temple, Karikkal Sree Mahavishnu-Gopalakrishna temple, Parappool kavu and Parappool Sree Maha Vishnu Temple are some of the temples there.

== Sports ==
Pattuvam Panchayath organizes an annual sports event called Panchayath Mela, which includes sports and athletic games. Football and cricket are the favourite sports. Parappool Cricket Club is one of the oldest cricket clubs in Kerala. It plays District level championship every year. Pattuvam Turf is a new sports turf for football and cricket and was inaugurated on 8 May 2022. It is one of the biggest turfs in Kannur.

== Education ==
=== Schools ===
- Government Higher Secondary School
- Government Model Residential Higher Secondary School
- Pattuvam Upper Primary School
- Government LP School Pattuvam Kadav
- Ariyil Upper Primary School
- Government Harijan Welfare Lower Primary School
- Muthukuda Lower Primary School
- Mullool Lower Primary School
- Ariyil Government Lower Primary School

=== Colleges ===
- College of Applied Sciences. Pattuvam is affiliated with Kannur University and was established in 1999 with regular courses of B.Sc. (Computer Sciences) and B.Sc. (Electronics).The college also provides PGDCA courses conducted by the Institute of Human Resources Development.

== Tourist attractions ==
- Samskriti- Sahajeevanam Heritage Museum and Tarumitra Biodiversity Center, Muthukuda
- Vellikkeel Eco Tourism Park, 5 km from Pattuvam
- Various temples in the area are known for conducting Theyyam and Kaliyattam

== Transport ==
The national highway NH 66 passes through Taliparamba junction. Goa and Mumbai can be accessed on the north and Cochin and Thiruvananthapuram can be accessed on the south. The road to the east of Iritty connects to Mysore and Bangalore.

The nearest railway station is Payangadi on Mangalore-Palakkad line, which can be accessed by the Pazhayangadi-Taliparamba road. Trains are available to almost all parts of India and have scheduled stops at this station.

There are airports at Kannur, Mangalore and Calicut.
