= Taliparamba =

Taliparamba Perinchelloor, Lakshmipuram
- Municipality
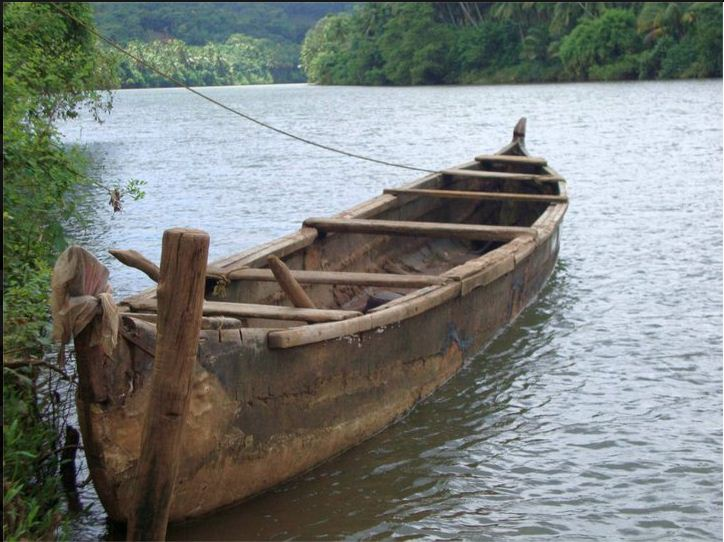
- Kuppam River

- Location in Kerala
- Coordinates: 12.0368°N 75.3601°E
- Country: India
- State: Kerala
- District: Kannur
- Municipality: 1990

Government
  - Type: Municipal Council
  - Municipal Chairman: P.K. Subair
  - Revenue Divisional Officer: S. Vandana
  - Deputy Superintendent of Police: Sumesh T.P.
  - MLA: T K Govindan

Area
  - Total: 18.96 km^{2} (7.32 sq mi)
- Elevation: 49 m (161 ft)

Population (2011)
  - Total: 44,247
  - Density: 2,334/km^{2} (6,044/sq mi)

Languages
  - Official: Malayalam, English
- Time zone: UTC+5:30 (IST)
- PIN: 670141
- Telephone code: 0460
- Vehicle registration: KL-59
- Nearest city: Kannur (22 km)
- Sex ratio: 1187 ♂/♀
- Literacy: 96%
- Taluk: Taliparamba
- Assembly constituency: Taliparamba
- Lok Sabha constituency: Kannur
- Climate: Tropical rainforest (Köppen:Af)
- Website: www.taliparambamunicipality.in

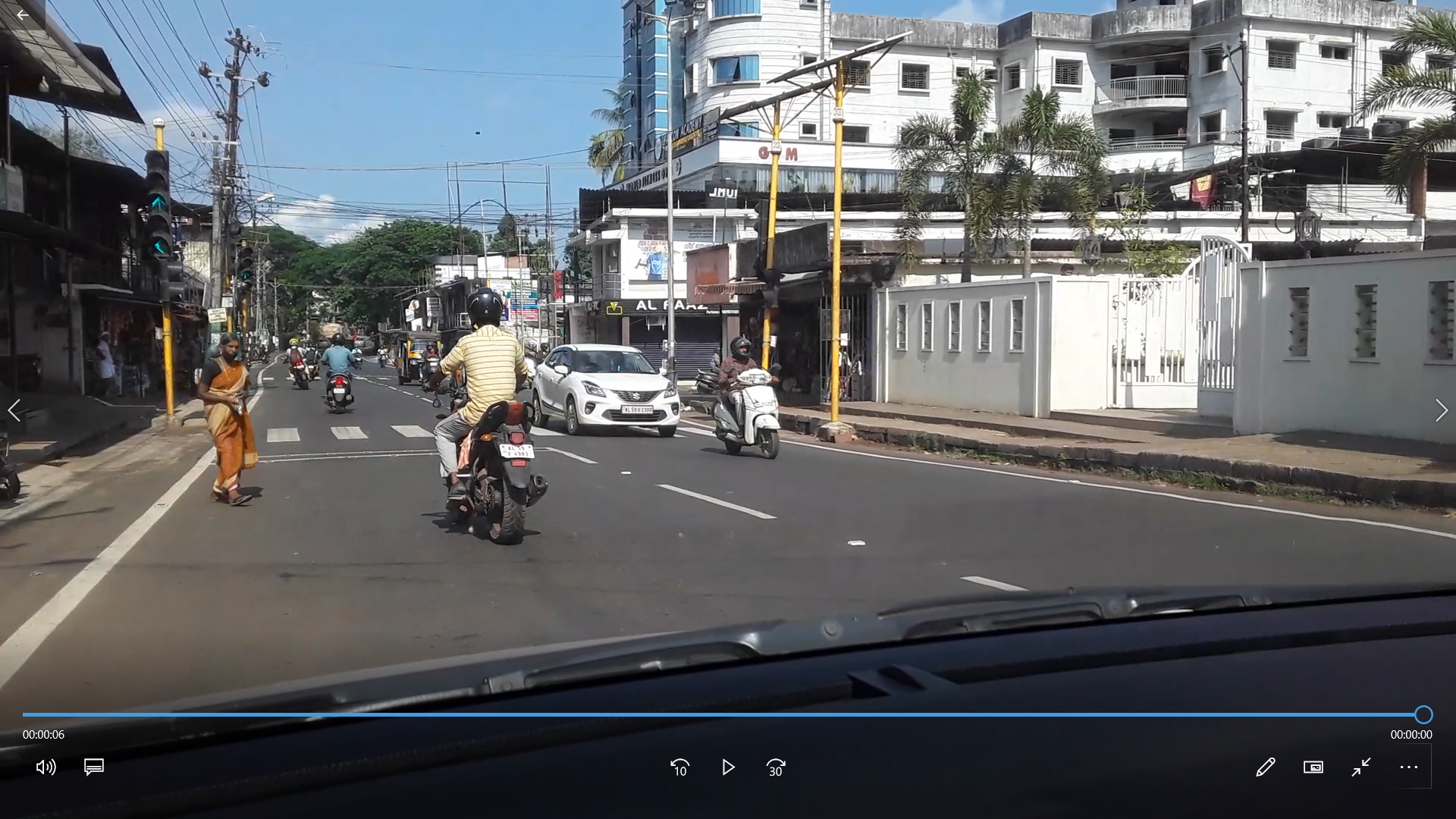
Manna Junction

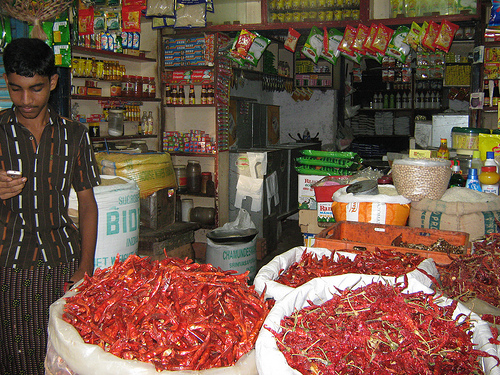
Taliparamba Market

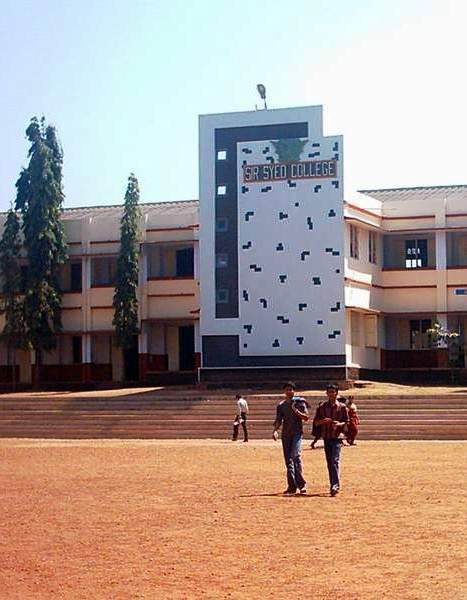
Sir Syed College, Taliparamba

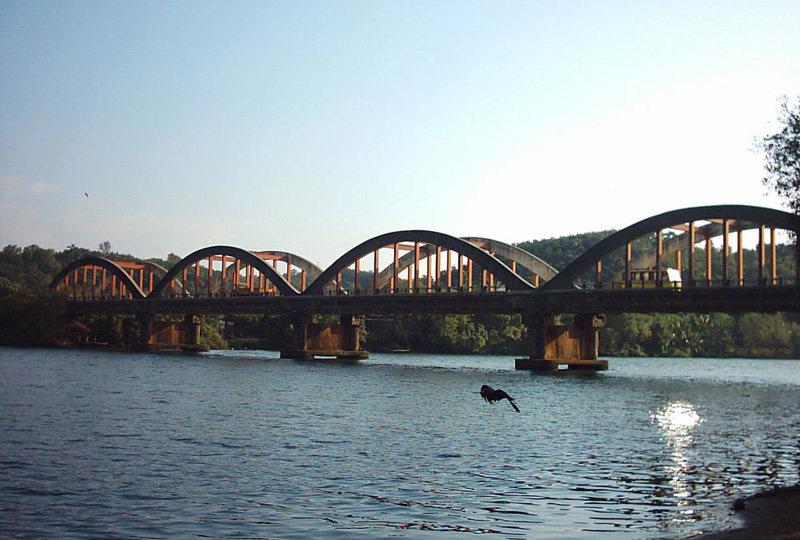
Kuppam Bridge

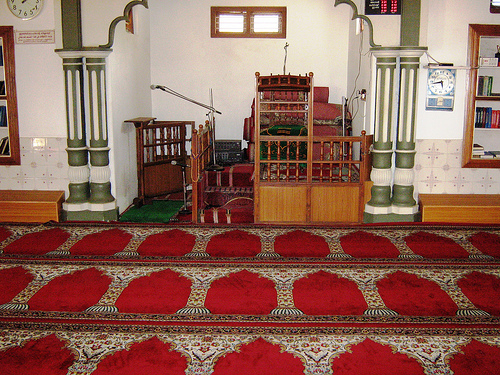
Syed Nagar Mosque

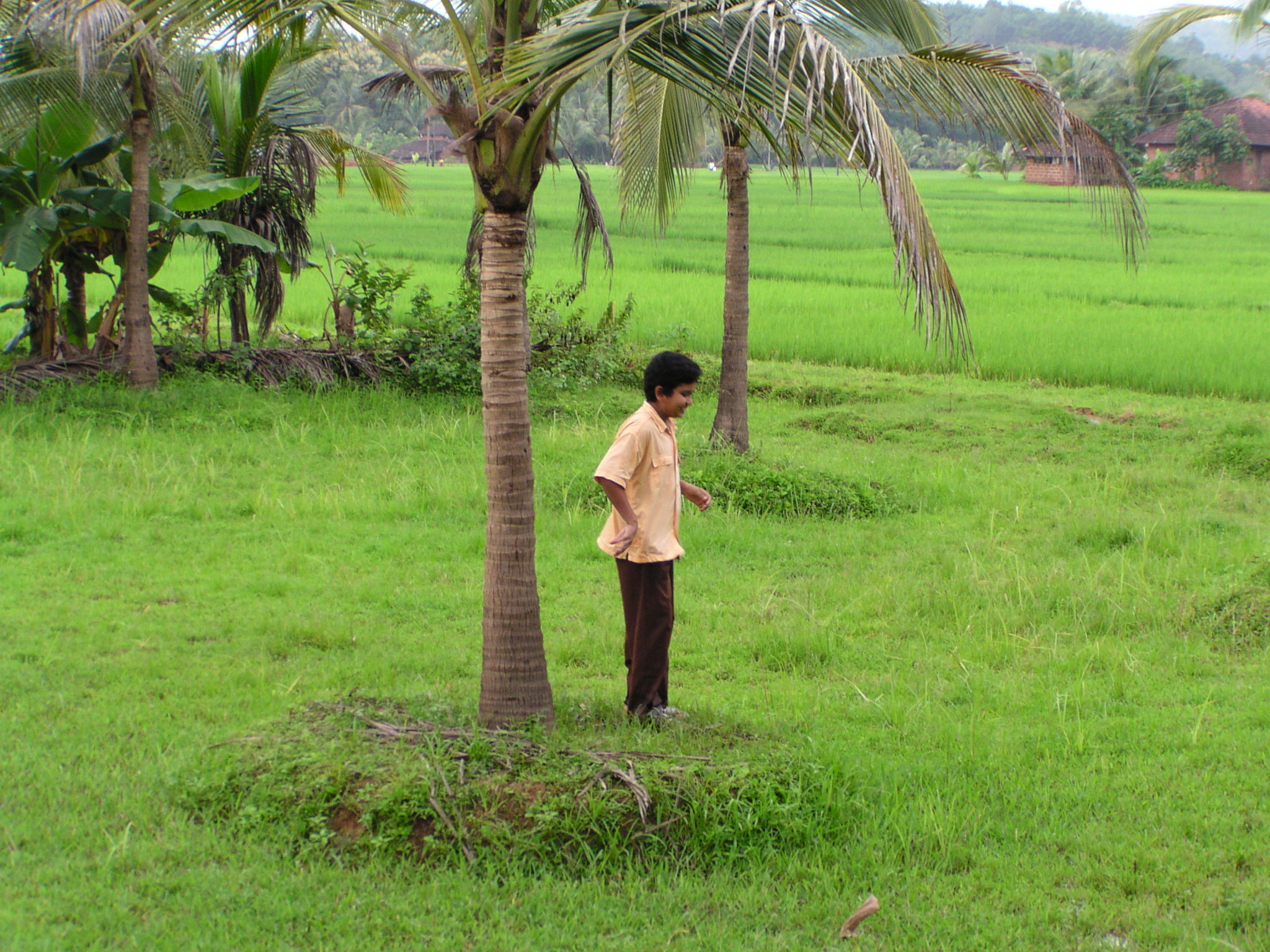
Kuttiyeri Hanging Bridge area

Taliparamba (also known as Perinchelloor and Lakshmipuram) is a Municipality and Taluk of Kannur district in Kerala state, India. The municipal town spreads over an area of 18.96 square kilometres (7.32 sq mi) and is inhabited by 44,247 number of people.

== Etymology ==
The town's name may be derived from "Tali" (plate) and "Parambu" (area or ground), and from the legend of Rajarajeshwara Temple. According to this legend, the Ikshvaku King Maandhatha offered great penance to Shiva who in return gifted him with a Shiva Linga and instructed him to place it at a site where there had never been a cremation ground. He found a space the size of a plate in Perinchelloor, and hence the name Taliparamba became attached to the area. Lakshmipuram, a previous name for the city, means place of prosperity.

== History ==
Taliparamba was one of the traditional establishments in ancient Kerala. It is located in erstwhile Kolathunadu, which was ruled over by the Mushika/Kolathiri/Chirakkal Royal Family. It was also once a part of the Mannanar dynasty. As per tradition, Taliparamba originated as the Perinchalloor Brahmin settlement. Of the 2,000 Brahmin families who settled here, only 45 remain today, In 1955 the Taliparamba panchayat was formed, with Balakrishna Menon as its first president. In 1975 the Pattuvam region was separated from the panchayat. In 1990 Taliparamba Municipality was formed by merging Anthoor and Taliparamba panchayats and then bifurcated Anthoor region from Taliparamba to create separate Anthoor Municipality in 2015.

== Location ==
Taliparamba town lies on NH 66 in the midland region of Kannur district. It is located approximately 22 km (14 mi) north of the district headquarters Kannur and 20 km (12 mi) southeast of the coastal town Payyanur. The Taliparamba-Iritty road or SH 36 and Taliparamba-Coorg border major district road serve as gateways to the highland region bordering Western Ghats of the district. Kuppam River and the Valapattanam River flows to the north and south of Taliparamba town respectively.

== Administration ==
Taliparamba is the headquarters of Taliparamba taluk, one of the five taluks constituting the district and one of the revenue divisions in Kerala.

=== Taliparamba Revenue Division ===
Kannur district is divided into two revenue divisions, Taliparamba Revenue Division in the north and Thalassery Revenue Division in the south, respectively. Taliparamba revenue division has jurisdiction over taluks of Payyanur, Taliparamba and Kannur.

Taliparamba Assembly constituency is part of the Kannur Lok Sabha constituency.

=== Taliparamba Municipality ===
Taliparamba Municipality is divided into 35 wards covering an area of 18.96 km^{2} (7.32 sq mi), for which the elections are held every five years. Taliparamba Municipality has a total administration over 8,909 houses, to which it supplies basic amenities like water and sewerage. It is also authorized to build roads within municipality limits and impose taxes on properties coming under its jurisdiction. The municipal secretary, a government appointee, is the administrative head of the municipality and its chief executive officer.

== Geography ==
Taliparamba is located at 12.05°N 75.35°E. It has an average elevation of 56 metres (184 ft) above sea level. The surrounding area (including the villages of Pattuvam, Pariyaram, Kuttiyeri, Karimbam, and Koonam) features lush green fields and low rolling hills. The Kuppam and Valapattanam rivers surround the town and the Arabian Sea is only 14 kilometres (8.7 mi) to the west of the city.

== Education ==
In the 14th and 15th centuries, during the regime of the Kolathiri Rajas, Taliparamba was renowned in Kerala as a seat of learning, enlightenment, and culture. Today, the most prominent educational institutions include:

=== Colleges ===
- Pariyaram Medical College
- Government College of Engineering, Kannur
- National Institute of Fashion Technology Kannur
- Sir Syed College, Taliparamba
- Taliparamba Arts and Science College
- SI-MET College of Nursing, Taliparamba
- Lourde College of Nursing, Taliparamba
- Taliparamba Co-operative School of Nursing
- KILA Institute of Public Policy and Leadership (IPPL), Taliparamba
- National College, Taliparamba
- MM Knowledge Arts and Science College, Taliparamba
- Keyi Sahib Training College, Taliparamba
- Al Maquar Arabic college, Taliparamba
- College of Applied Science, Pattuvam
- Morazha Co-operative Arts & Science College
- Aerosis College of Aviation and Management Studies, Karakkund
- Skywest Aviation Academy, Taliparamba

=== Schools ===
- Tagore Vidyaniketan Govt HSS, Taliparamba
- Moothedath Higher Secondary School, Taliparamba
- Sir Syed Higher Secondary School, Karimbam
- Seethi Sahib Higher Secondary School
- St. Paul's High School, Taliparamba
- Chinmaya Vidyalaya, Taliparamba
- Bharatiya Vidya Bhavan, Taliparamba
- Yatheem Khana UP School, Manna
- Trichambaram U.P.School
- Akkiparamba UP School, Chiravakk
- Shyam Prasad School, Taliparamba

== Demographics ==
As of the 2011 census, Taliparamba Municipality had population of 72,465 of which 33,779 are males while 38,685 are females with an area of 43.08 km^{2} (16.63 sq mi). In 2015, Anthoor region was carved from Taliparamba Municipality and formed a separate Anthoor Municipality. After bifurcation, Taliparamba Municipality had a population of 44,247 which consists of 20,838 males and 23,409 females with an area of 18.96 km^{2} (7.32 sq mi). The female sex ratio here is of 1187 against state average of 1084. The average population density is 2,334 inhabitants per square kilometre (6,050/sq mi).

Literacy rate of Taliparamba town is 96% higher than state average of 94.00%. In Taliparamba, male literacy is around 97.50% while female literacy rate is 93.06%.

== Kinfra Textile Park ==
Kinfra Textile Park Taliparamba located in Nadukani near Taliparamba established in 2010 by Kinfra spread over 50.18 hectares is the hub of textile manufacturing activities in Kannur district. A textile dyeing and printing centre also is being facilitated in Nadukani Kinfra Apparel Park.

== Politics ==
The political landscape of Taliparamba Assembly is dominated by the CPI(M). The current MLA of Taliparamba is T. K. Govindan Master, who won the 2026 Kerala Legislative Assembly election.

Taliparamba municipality has strong presence of IUML, CPI(M) along with nominal presence of INC and BJP. Taliparamba municipality is currently ruled by UDF allied IUML.

=== Taliparamba Municipality Election 2025 ===
S.No.	Party name	Party symbol	Number of Councillors
01	UDF		19
02	LDF		12
03	BJP		03

== Law and order ==
The municipality comes under jurisdiction of Taliparamba police station which was formed on 30 May 1931. This police station comprises within 8 villages, i.e. Taliparamba, Pattuvam, Anthoor, Morazha, Kooveri, Kuttiyeri, Panniyoor and Kurumathur.

Taliparamba is also a headquarters of Taliparamba sub division under Kannur rural police district which is formed on 01.08.1986. It is situated 400m east of NH 66. The sub division has jurisdiction control over five police stations viz. Taliparamba, Alakode, Kudianmala, Sreekandapuram and Payyavoor.

Court Complexes in Taliparamba

- Additional District Sessions Court, Taliparamba
- Fast Track Special Court POCSO, Taliparamba
- Judicial First Class Majistrate Court, Taliparamba
- Munsiff Court, Taliparamba
- Motor Accident Claims Tribunal, Taliparamba

== Transportation ==
The National Highway (NH 66) passes through Taliparamba Town. Goa and Mumbai can be accessed on the northern side and Cochin and Thiruvananthapuram can be accessed on the southern side. National Highway 66 is given node for construction of 6 lane on different stretches of Kerala including Taliparamba-Muzhappilangad and Nileshwar-Taliparamba stretches. SH 36 connects Taliparamba town with Sreekandapuram, Irikkur, Iritty and Mysore and Bangalore are accessible from Iritty towards east.

Taliparamba has several private and KSRTC buses plying places inside and outside the Kannur district. Taliparamba is well-connected to its suburbs through several bus services. Taliparamba town has two bus terminals - Taliparamba Municipal Bus Stand on NH-66 road and Kakkathodu Bus Stand on SH-36 road.

The nearest railway stations are Kannapuram, Pazhayangadi and Kannur, which are situated 12 km (7.5 mi), 15 km (9.3 mi) and 21 km (13 mi) respectively away from the town, on the Shoranur-Mangalore Section under Southern Railway.

The nearest airport is at Kannur, 37 kilometres (23 mi) away. A road is being proposed to develop from Taliparamba to Kannur Airport which passes through Mayyil, Kololam, Chalode areas. Once it is materialised, distance from Kannur Airport to Payyanur, Kanhangad and other such places north of Taliparamba will be reduced and benefited. Mangalore and Calicut are the other Airports nearby.

== Tourism ==
Vismaya is an amusement water theme park situated nearby Taliparamba. The bridges at Kuttiyeri and Kooveri, Vellikkeel Eco-Tourism Park, and the riverside temple at Parassinikkadavu attract many tourists. Paithal Mala and Palakkayam Thattu Hill stations are other popular tourist spots nearby.

== Gallery ==
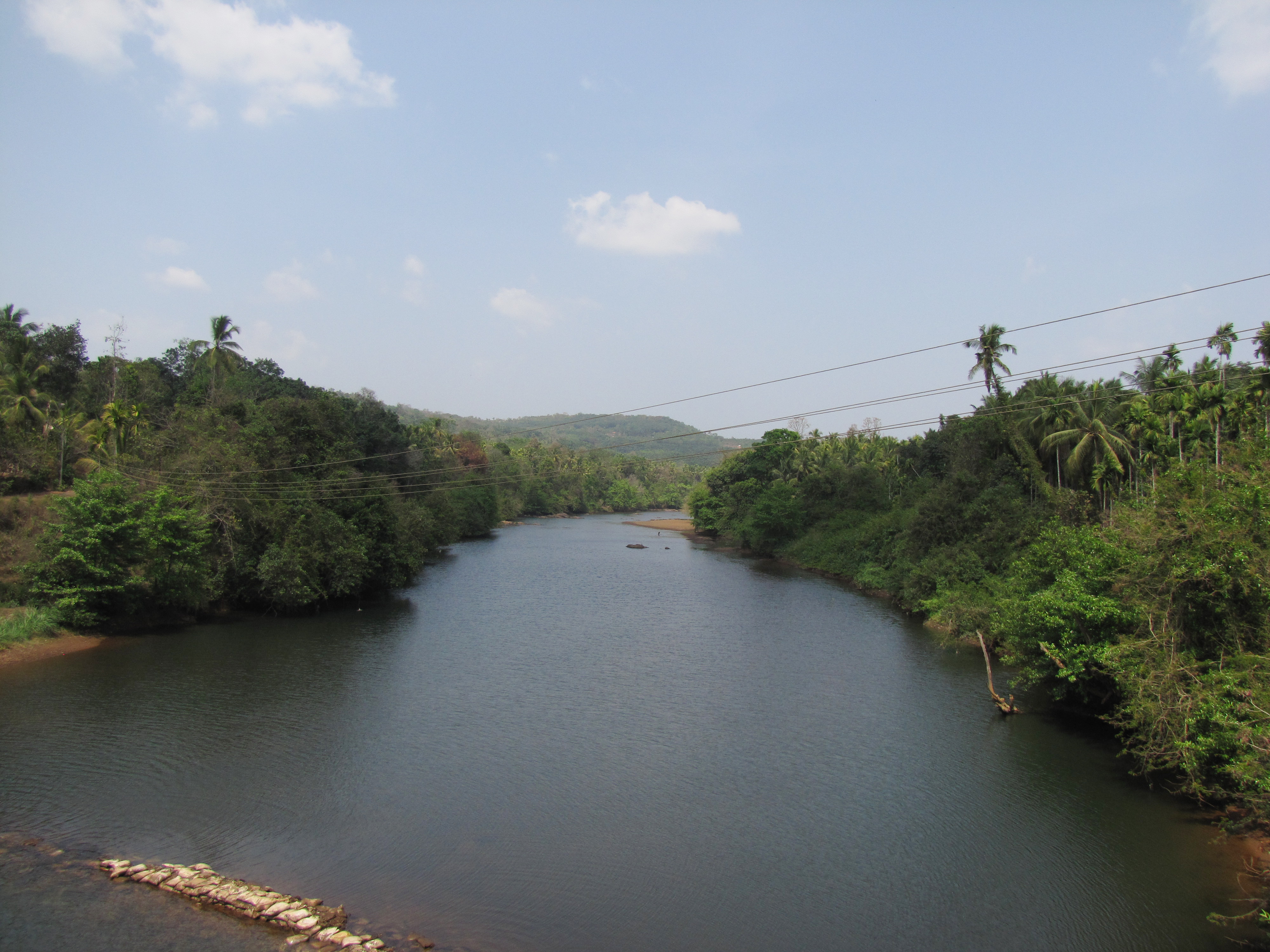
Kuppam River viewed from Koovery Hanging Bridge

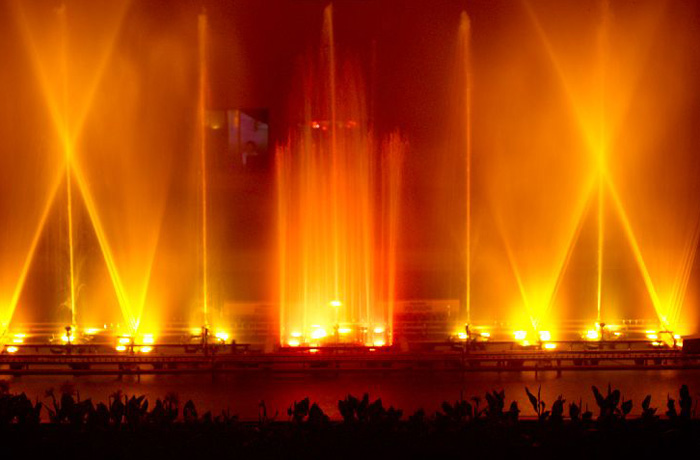
Vismaya lasershow

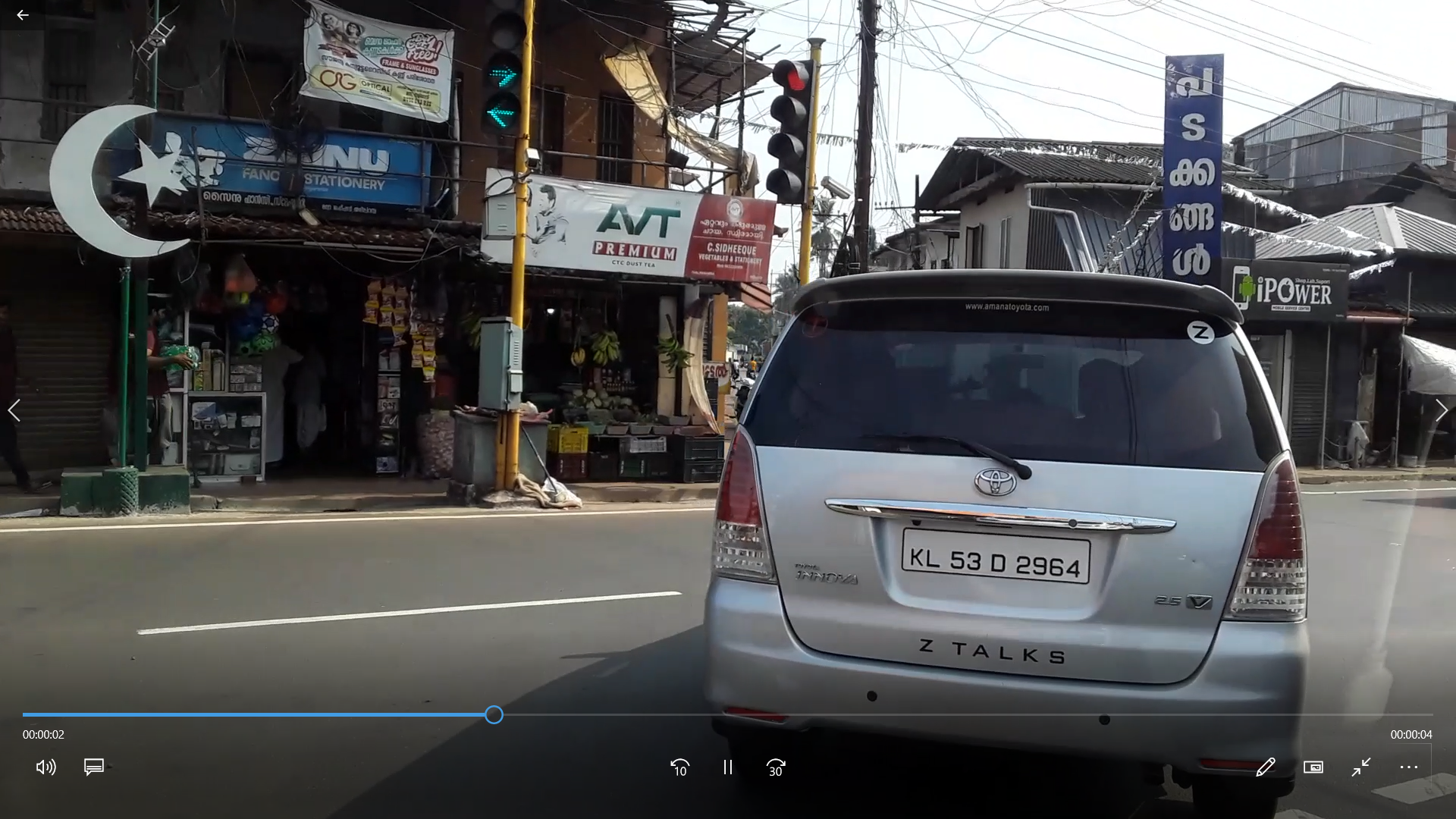
Manna Junction

== Religions ==
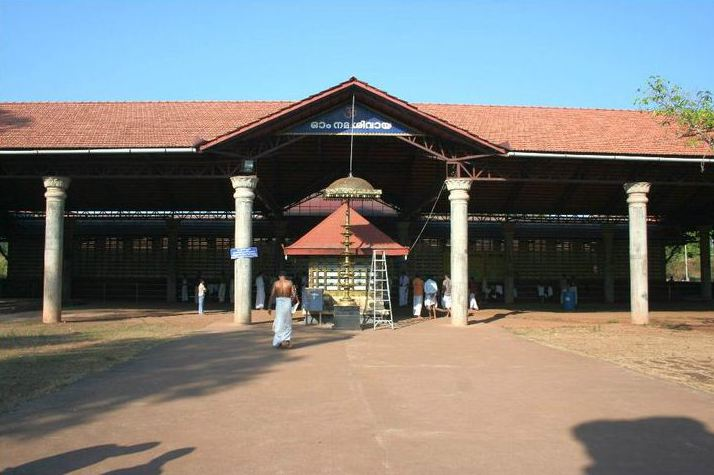
Rajarajeshwara Temple

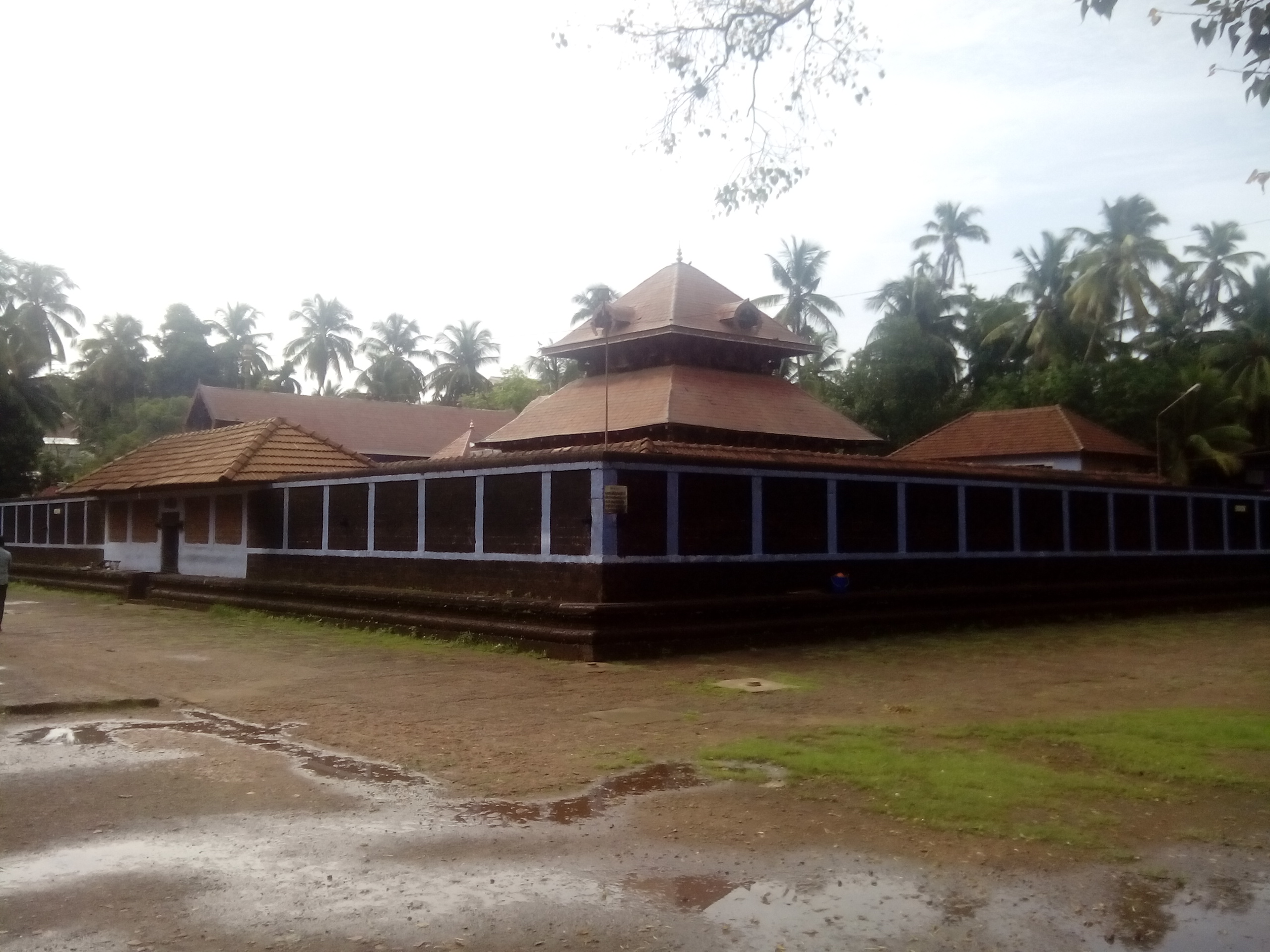
Trichambaram temple

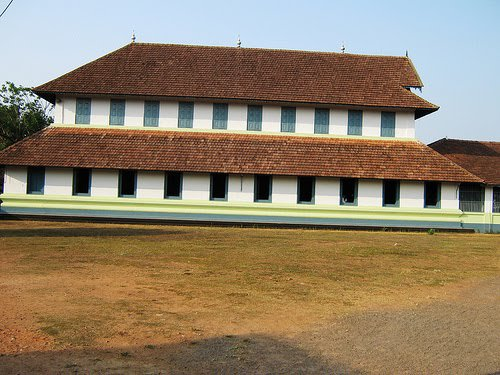
Juma masjid

Religions in Taliparamba Municipality (2011)
Religion	Percent(%)
Hindu	60.17%
Muslim	35.15%
Christian	4.16%
Sikh	0.02%
Buddhist	0.02%
Jain	0.00%
Unclassified	0.03%
Not stated	0.45%

Taliparamba is home to a number of temples, churches, and mosques. Temples include the Rajarajeshwara Temple, Trichambaram Temple and Parassinikkadavu Temple. Taliparamba Juma Masjid and St. Mary's Church are other prominent religious centres in the town.

=== Rajarajeshwara Temple ===
Rajarajeshwara Temple is one of the 108 existing ancient Shiva Temples in Kerala. The temple is about 2 kilometres from Taliparamba town. Rajarajeswara Temple doesn't allow women to worship from inside the enclosure around the sanctum sanctorum during daytime. The temple even draws visitors from the neighboring states of Karnataka and Tamil Nadu. Karnataka former Chief Minister Yeddyurappa visited here many times. Tamil Nadu former Chief Minister Jayalalitha shared special relation with the temple.

=== Trichambaram Temple ===
The Trichambaram Temple is about 3 kilometres south of Taliparamba. The famous two-week Trichambaram festival is celebrated every year at this temple. On the final day of the festival, the scene of Balarama bidding farewell to his brother Krishna is enacted.

=== Kanjirangad Vaidyanatha Temple ===
Kanjirangad Vaidyanadtha Temple is the third important temple in Taliparamba, dedicated to the worship of Shiva. The three temples are together overseen by the Malabar Devaswom Board.

=== Taliparamba Juma masjid ===
The Taliparamba Valiya Juma masjid is inside the city's market. The city's main burial ground is near the masjid. The mosque's architecture features traditional Vasthu elements, while the interior demonstrates regal as well as traditional themes. The main hall, used mostly for Friday sermons, is built of wood and features large load-bearing pillars.

=== St. Mary's Forane Pilgrim church ===
Since the early 1960s, Syrian Catholics from Northern Travancore began to settle at Taliparamba for various purpose like education, employment and mercantile. Then Trichambaram St Paul's Church and Pushpagiri CMI Church were there for their religious purposes. On 25 December 1990, St Mary's Parish took birth under the Archdiocese of Tellicherry and laid foundation stone on 15 August 2008. On 14 April 2012 the church was inaugurated and opened for the public under the presidency of former Bishop Mar George Valyamattam. On 17 March 2013, the church was declared as a forane church and a pilgrimage centre.

=== Pushpagiri church ===
The church at Pushpagiri hills is Catholic.

=== Mosques ===
The city's mosques include Taliparamba Juma masjid, Syed Nagar mosque, Shadulipalli Market Road mosque, Yatheem Khana masjid, and Rifai Juma masjid.

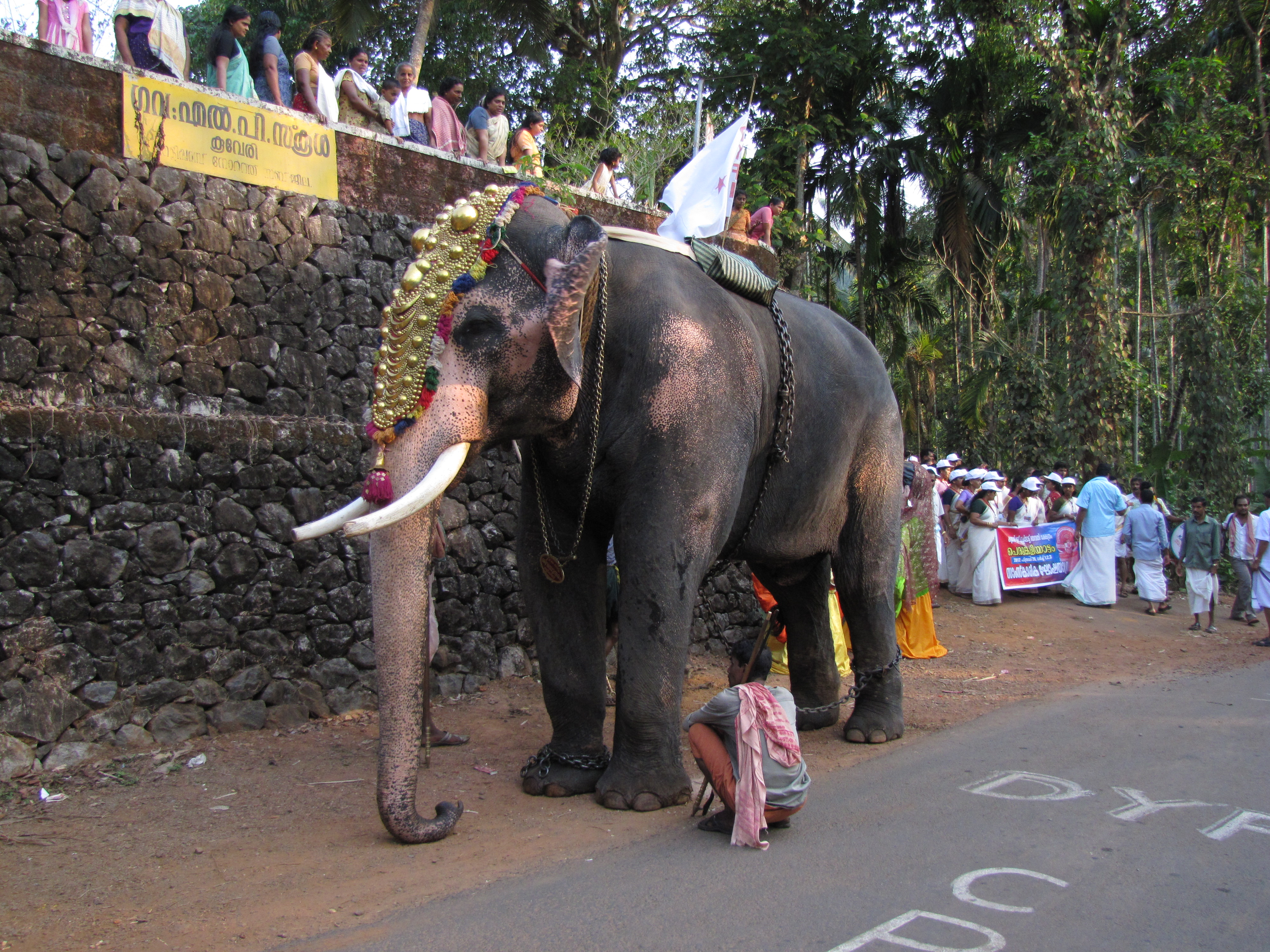
Taliparamba Shivasundaran

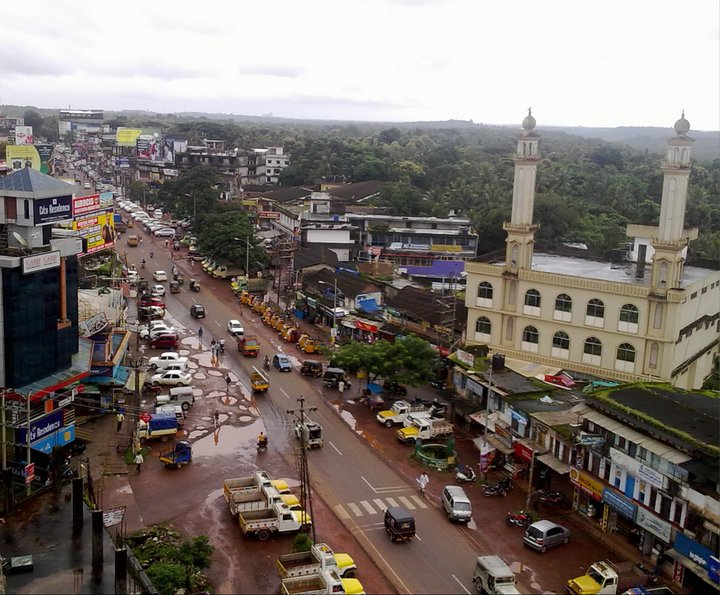
Skyview Taliparamba town

== Karimbam farm ==
The District Agricultural Farm at Karimbam is a major research organization in Taliparamba. The farm was originally established in 1905 by Sir Charles Alfred Barber at the behest of the Madras Government, based on the recommendation of the Famine Commission of 1880 of the Government of India. Although the objective was to do research on pepper, the activities of the farm were further extended to agroclimatic experiments, hybridization and the production and distribution of seeds and seedlings. Covering an area of 56 hectares, the farm has a rich biodiversity with a variety of indigenous and exotic fruit trees, such as Mangosteen, Rambutan, and Durian. Kerala government has proposed to develop Karimbam farm to be a tourist spot in the state.

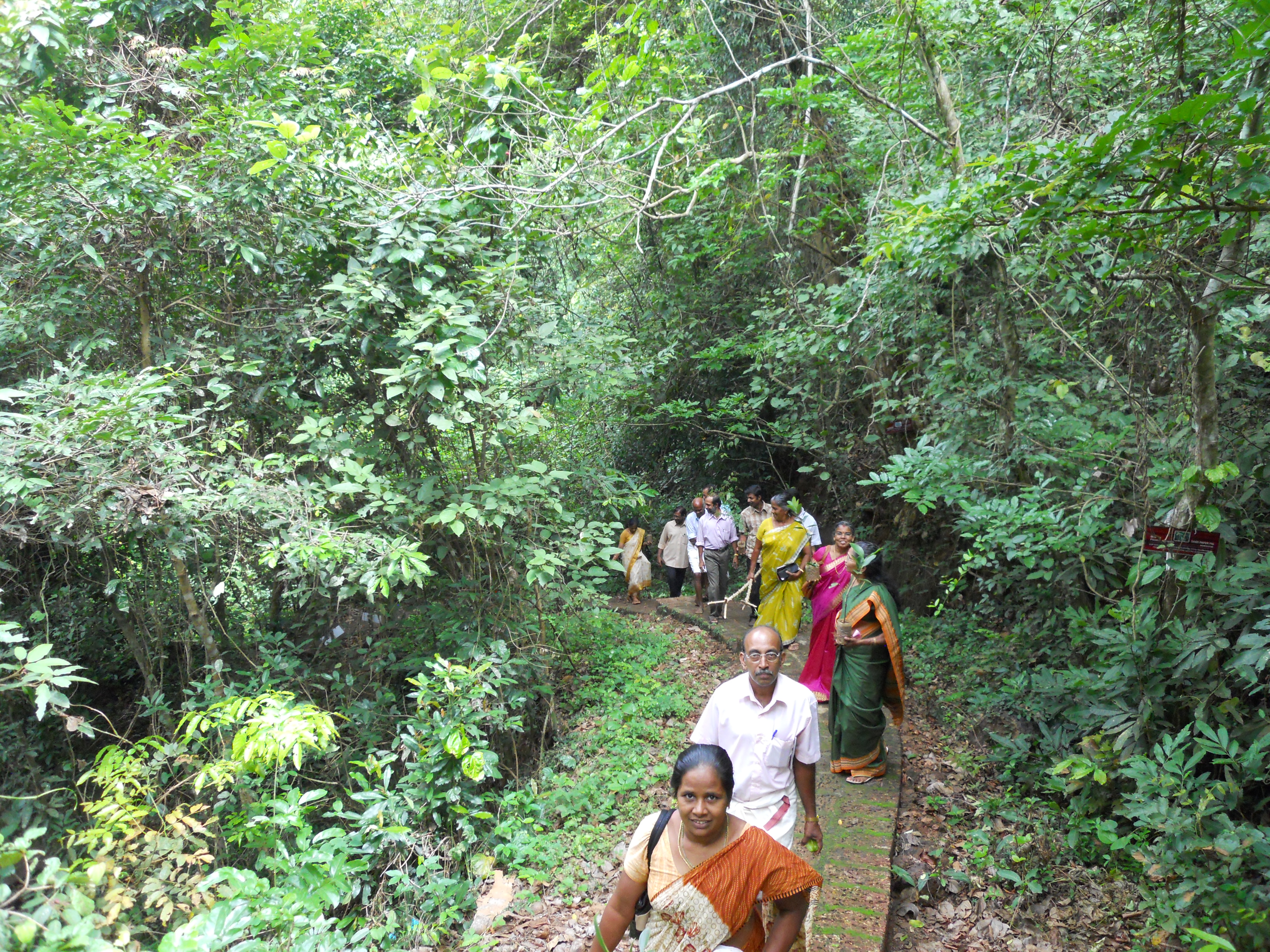
Forest footpath

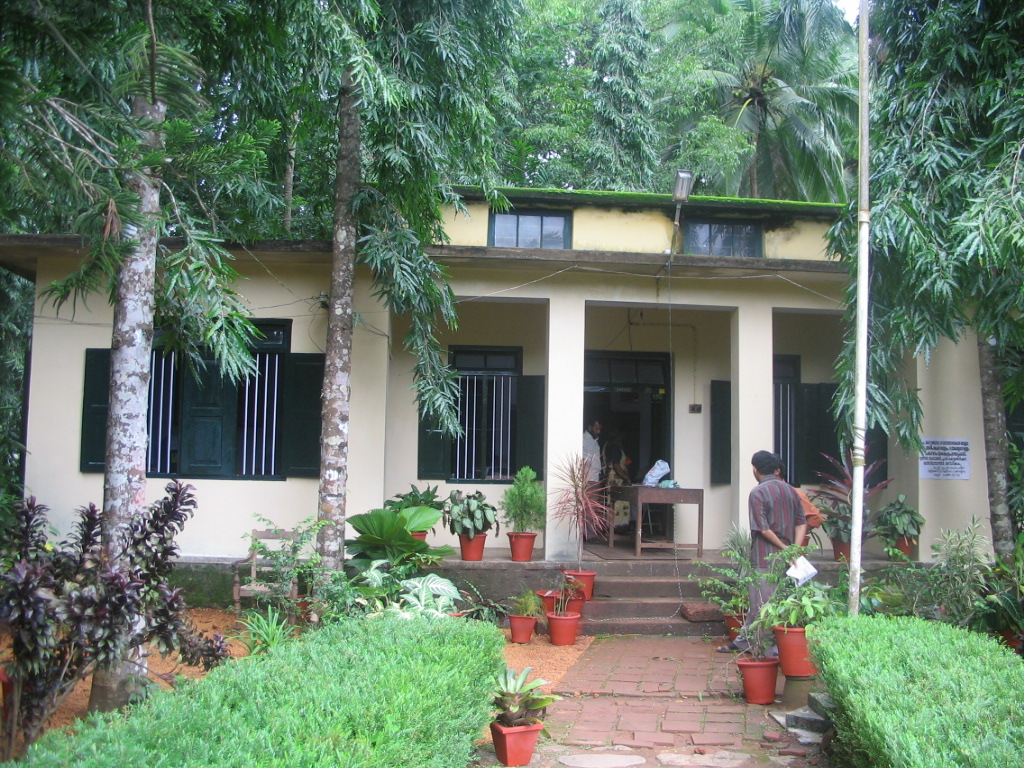
Farm Office

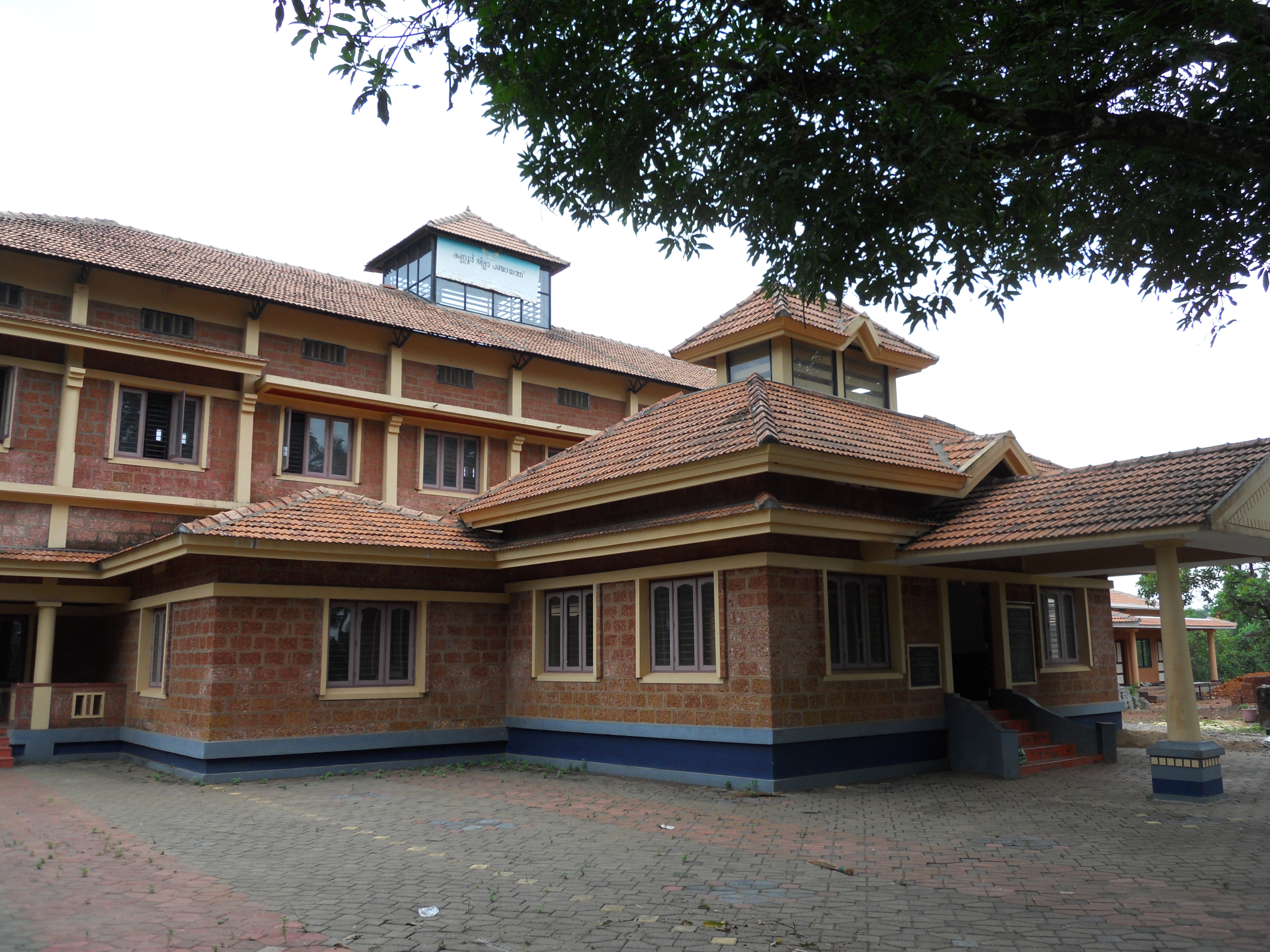
I.T.K.Center

== Notable people ==
- Santhosh Keezhattoor, film actor and producer
- Nikhila Vimal, film actress
- Reshmi Boban, film actress
- Athmiya Rajan, film actress
- Rathish Ambat, film director
- Raghavan, film actor
- Prakash Nambiar, film director
- Sadanam P. V. Balakrishnan, kathakali exponent
- P. K. Venugopalan Nambiar, agricultural scientist
- M. V. Govindan, politician
- Satheeshan Pacheni, politician
- John Brittas, politician, journalist
- T. K. Govindan Master, politician
- James Mathew, politician
- K. K. N. Pariyaram, politician
- N. Prabhakaran, writer, novelist
- Sherry Govindan, film director
- Sreerag R. Nambiar, writer-Uppum Mulakum
- Jishnu Raghavan, film actor
- M. Rajan Taliparamba, film producer
- Emil George, media personality

== See also ==
- Muyyam
- Alakkode Road
- Taliparamba West
- Dharmasala, Kannur
