= Kuttiyeri =

- village
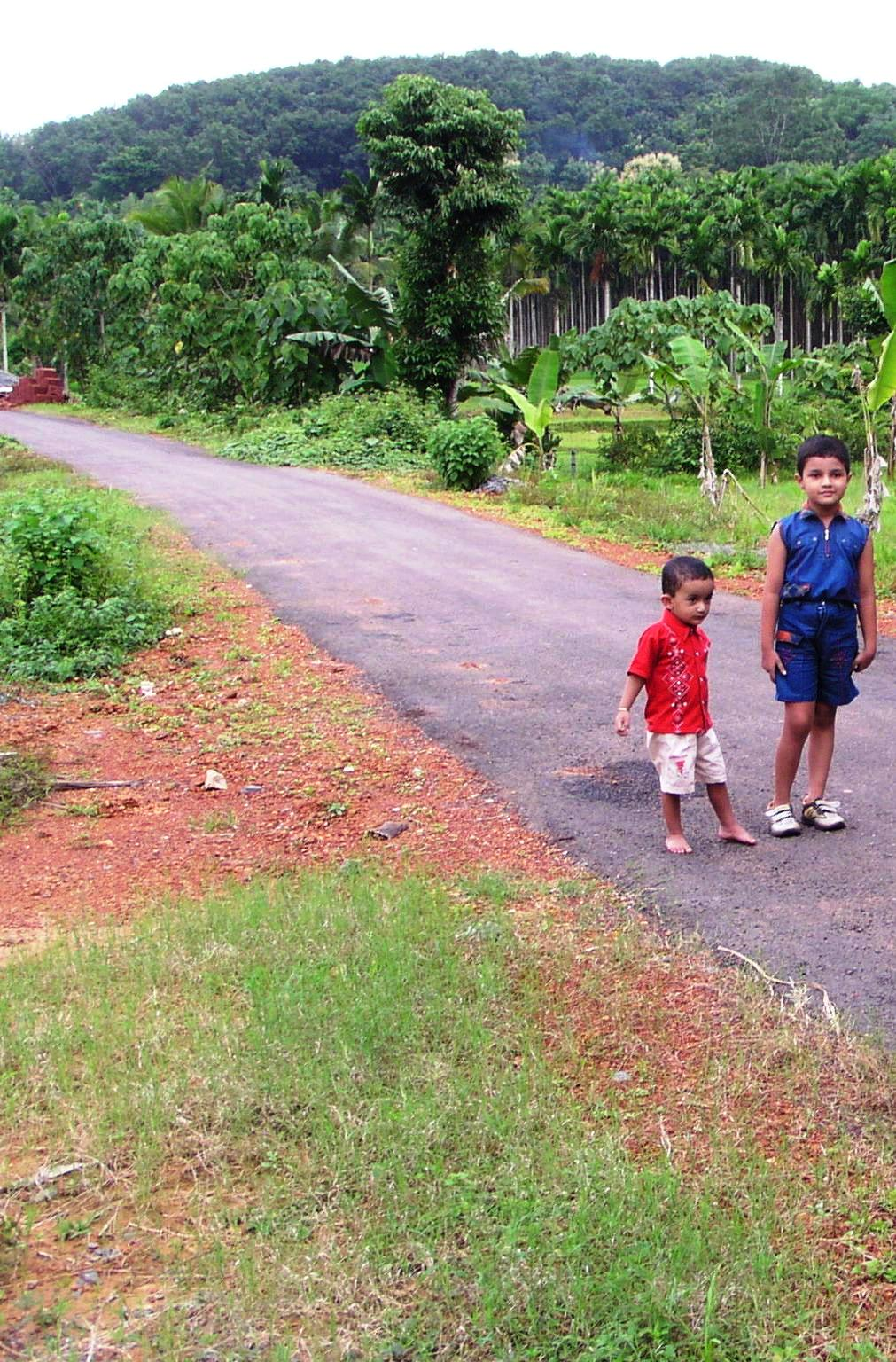
- Hanging Bridge road
- Interactive map of Kuttiyeri
- Coordinates: 12°4′0″N 75°21′0″E
- Country: India
- State: Kerala
- District: Kannur

Government
  - Body: Pariyaram Grama Panchayat

Area
  - Total: 22.04 km^{2} (8.51 sq mi)

Population (2011)
  - Total: 12,473
  - Density: 565.9/km^{2} (1,466/sq mi)

Languages
  - Official: Malayalam, English
- Time zone: UTC+5:30 (IST)
- ISO 3166 code: IN-KL
- Vehicle registration: KL-59

Kuttiyeri is a village of Pariyaram Grama Panchayath near Taliparamba town in Kannur district in the Indian state of Kerala. Mini villages of Vellavu, Mavichery, Thalora & Panangattoor are parts of Kuttiyeri.

== Demographics ==
As of 2011 Census, Kuttiyeri had a population of 12,473 with 6,009 males (48.2%) and 6,464 females (51.8%). Kuttiyeri village spreads over an area of 22.04 km^{2} (8.51 sq mi) with 2,861 families residing in it. The male-to-female sex ratio was 1,076, lower than the state average of 1,084. In Kuttiyeri, 11% of the population were under 6 years age. Kuttiyeri had overall literacy of 91.3% lower than the state average of 94%.

== Transportation ==
The national highway passes through the town of Taliparamba. Buses are available to Taliparamba. Trains are available. There are airports at Kannur, Mangalore and Calicut. All of them are small international airports with direct flights available only to Middle Eastern countries.
