= Anchampeedika, Kannur =

Anchampeedika
- Town
- Interactive map of Anchampeedika
- Coordinates: 11.978491°N 75.351041°E
- Country: India
- State: Kerala
- District: Kannur
- Taluka: Taliparamba

Government
  - Body: Municipal Council

Area
  - Total: 28.44 km^{2} (10.98 sq mi)

Languages
  - Official: Malayalam, English
- Time zone: UTC+5:30 (IST)
- PIN: 670331
- Telephone code: 497278****
- ISO 3166 code: IN-KL
- Vehicle registration: KL-13, KL-59
- Sex ratio: 1121 ♂/♀
- Climate: pleasant (Köppen)

Anchampeedika is a town in the Kannur district of the North Malabar region in the Indian state of Kerala. Anchampeedika is located roughly 13.5 km from the Kannur Corporation, and it is adjacent to the Taliparamba municipality.

== Geography ==
Anchampeedika is located at a significant location between Kannur, Taliparamba and Cherukunnu.

Anchampeedika shares borders with Morazha to the north, Kalliasseri to the south, Cherukunnu and Kannapuram to the west, and Dharmasala to the east.

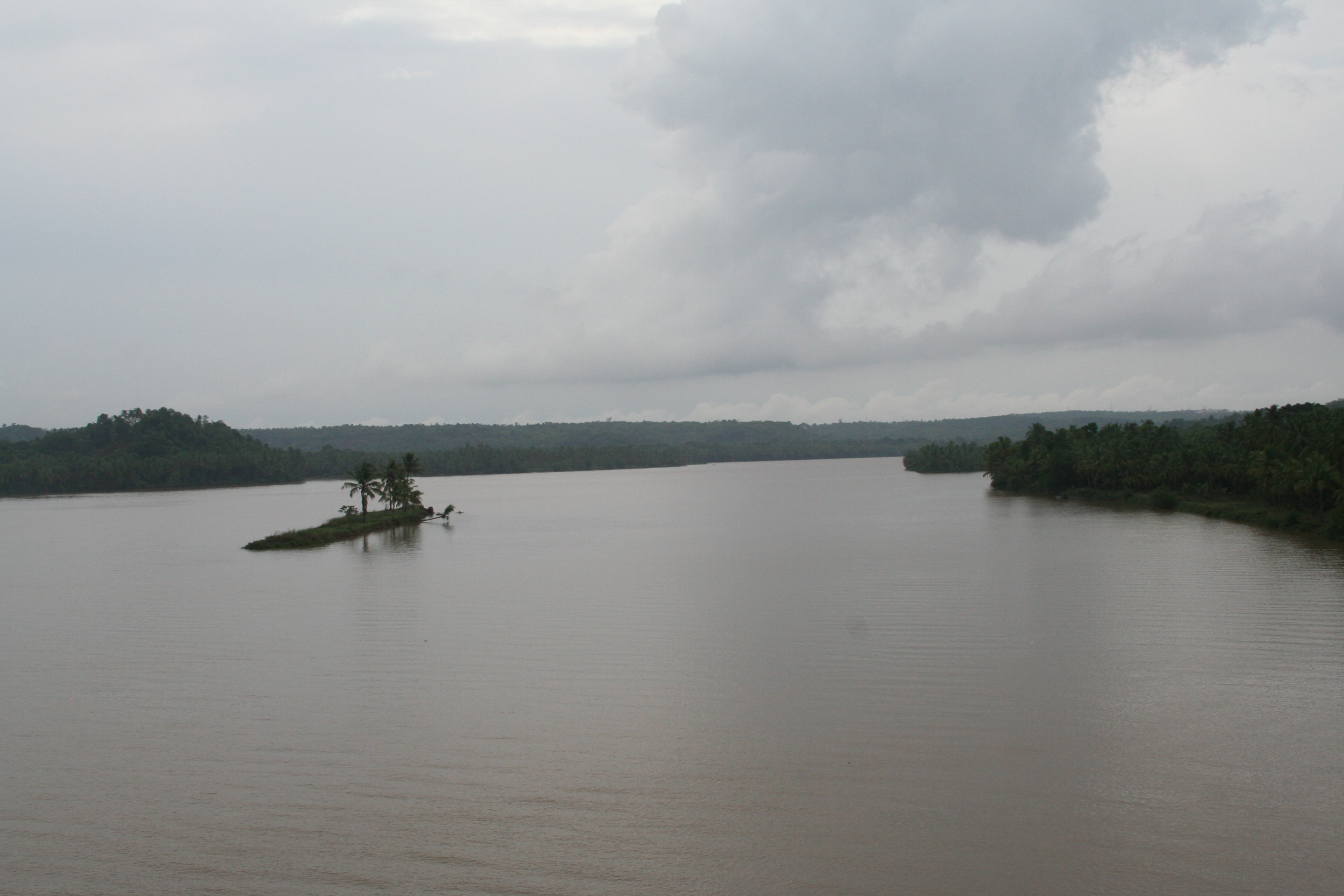
Scenic view of Valapattanam River at Parassinikkadavu

== Etymology ==
The name Anchampeedika means "Fifth Shop." The town has seen tremendous growth since 2010. The town has been a nexus of political, social and economic reforms.

== History ==
Anchampeedika was previously under Kolathiri rule. Later, Tipu Sultan adjoined this area as part of the Kingdom of Mysore. During British Raj, the kingdom was under Chirakkal Taluk of Malabar District in the Madras Presidency. After the formation of the Kerala State, this area was made brought under the Kalliasseri panchayat in the Cannanore District.

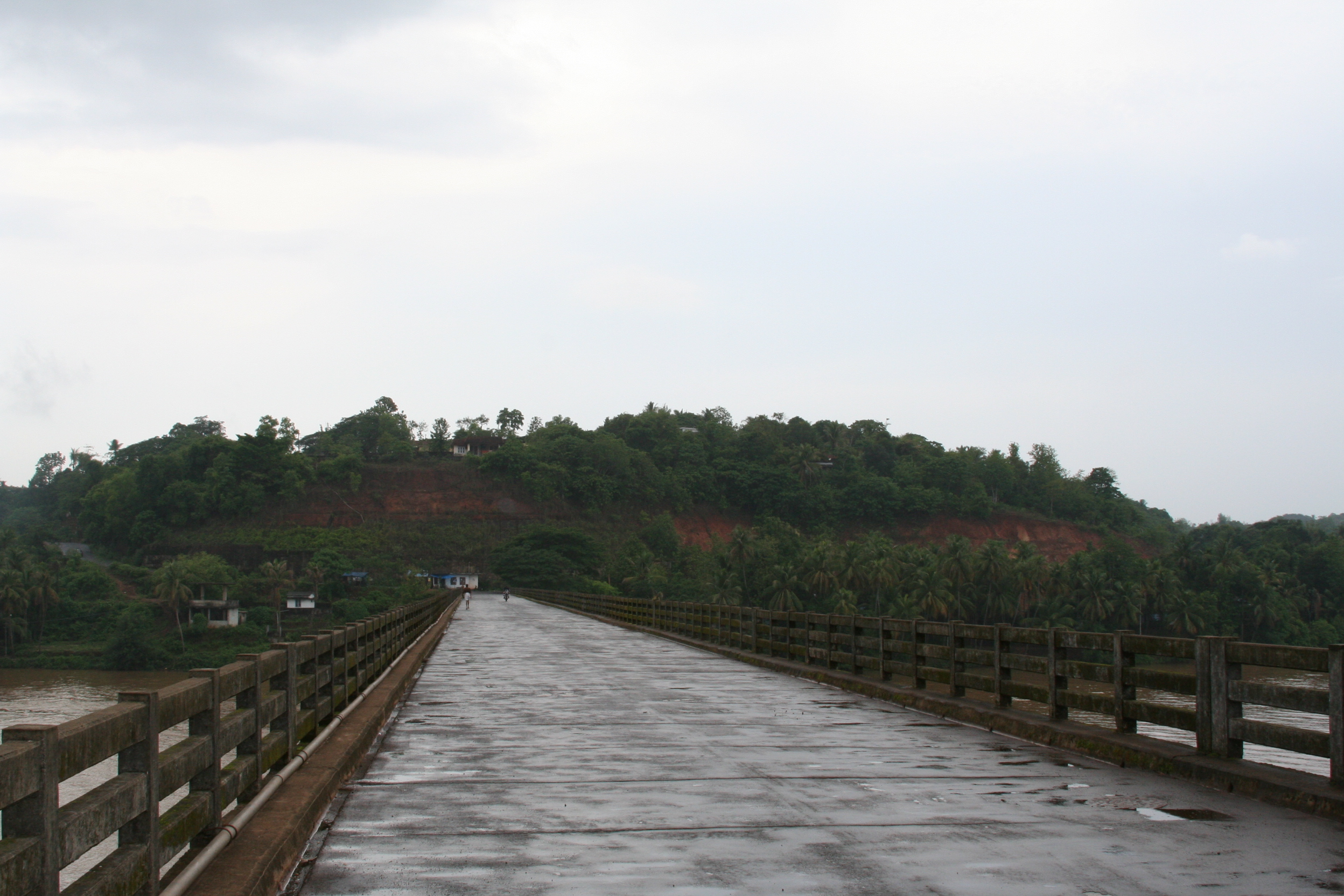
The Parassinikkdavu Bridge – which connects Anthoor to Mayyil, Kolachery and Narath

== Demographics ==
According to the 2011 India Census, Anthoor had a population of 36,290, with 17,154 men and 19,136 women.

Anthoor was a panchayath consisting of two small villages, Morazha and Anthoor. In 1990, when the government of Kerala announced new municipalities, Anthoor Panchayat was merged with Taliparamba to form the new Municipality of Taliparamba. Later, in 2015, the government separated Anthoor from Taliparamba and made it an independent municipality. Anthoor is a municipality by its population and density, but maintains with the characteristics of a small village. The village is located on NH-17, situated near Taliparamba in the Kannur District of the North Malabar region in Kerala.

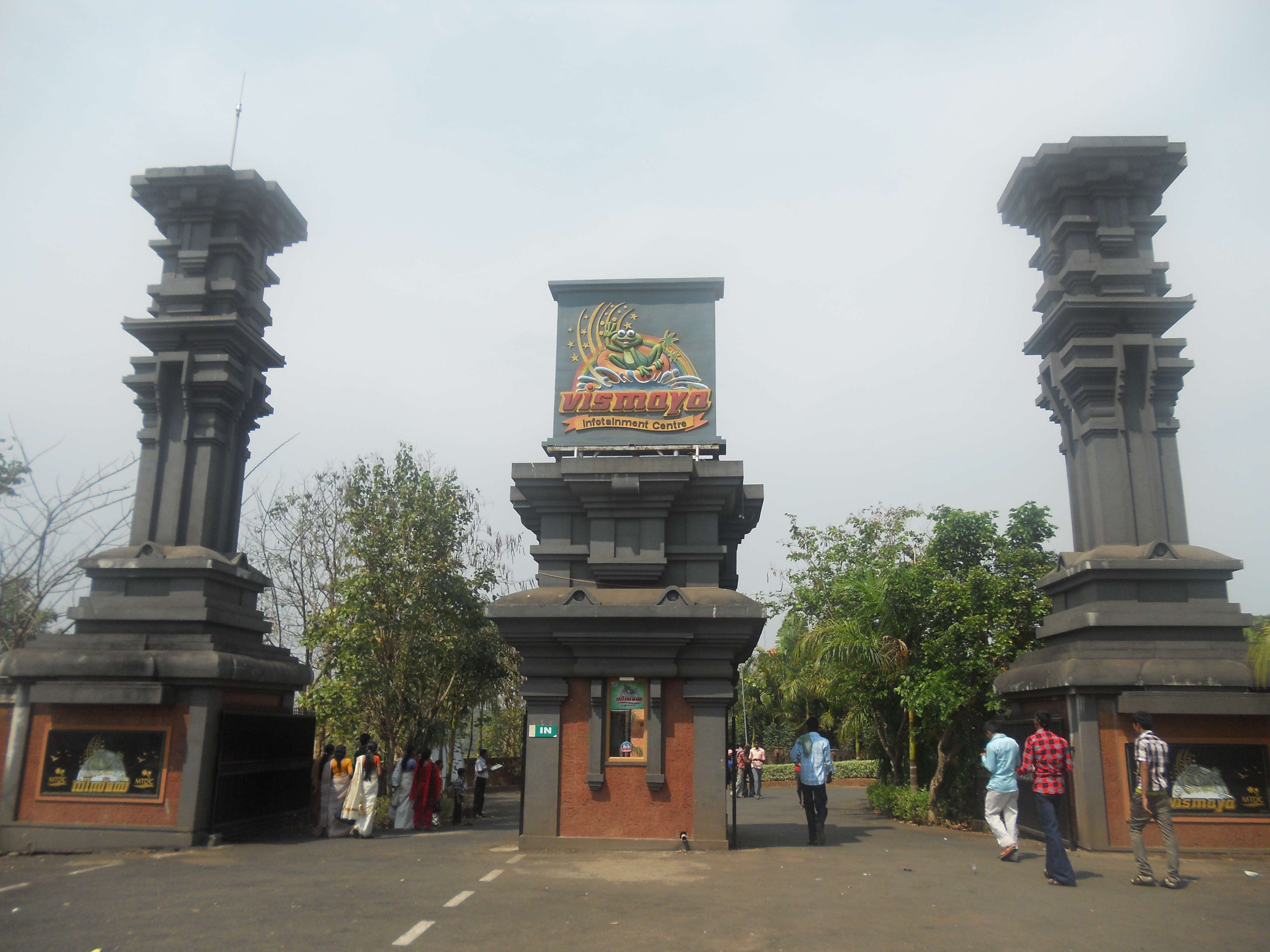
The Entrance of Vismaya Infotainment Park

== Administration ==
- District: Kannur
- Taluk/Tehsil: Taliparamba
- Municipality: Anthoor
- Block: Taliparamba
- Assembly constituency: Taliparamba
- Lok Sabha constituency : Kannur
- Police Station: Kannapuram
- Nearest Railway Station: Kannapuram

== Post offices ==
- Anchampeedika-670331

== Tourism ==
- Vellikkeel Eco Tourism Park

== Other places of interests ==
- Neeliyar Kottam (Near Kannur University Main Campus)
- Ozhacrome Temple Pond
- Paddy Fields of Morazha and Kanool
- Scenic beauty of Punnakulangara
- Hills at Morazha, Muthuvani and Mayilaadu

== Institutions ==
- Institute of Co-operative Management, Parassinikkadavu
- Parrasianikkadavu Ayurveda Medical College
- Mangattuparambu Doordarshan Station
- Govt Engineering College, Kannur
- National Institute of Fashion Technology, Kannur
- Kendriya Vidyalaya Keltron Nagar
- KELTRON, Kannur
- Kerala Clays and Ceramic Products Limited
- Kannur University Main Campus

== Religious Institutions ==
- Kalliasseri Vattakil Sree Muchilottu Bhagavathi Temple
- Kandamthalli Sreekrishna Temple
- Parakkoth Temple
- Morazha Shiva Temple
- Anchampeedika Juma Masjid
- Kappothukavu

== Governance ==
- Member of the Legislative Assembly (India) - Mr. M. Vijin
- Member of Parliament - Mrs. P.K.Sreemathy Teacher

== Transport ==
The national highway (NH-66) passes through Kalliasseri, which is about 2 km from the town. Mangalore and Mumbai can be accessed on the northern side, and Cochin and Thiruvananthapuram can be accessed on the southern side. Regional connectivity between Anchampeedika to Kannur, Taliparamba and Cherukunnu exists through private buses plying on these routes. The nearest railway stations are Kannapuram and Pappinisseri on the Mangalore-Palakkad line. The Kannur International Airport is at a distance of approximately 38 km from the town.
