= Punnakkulangara =

- village
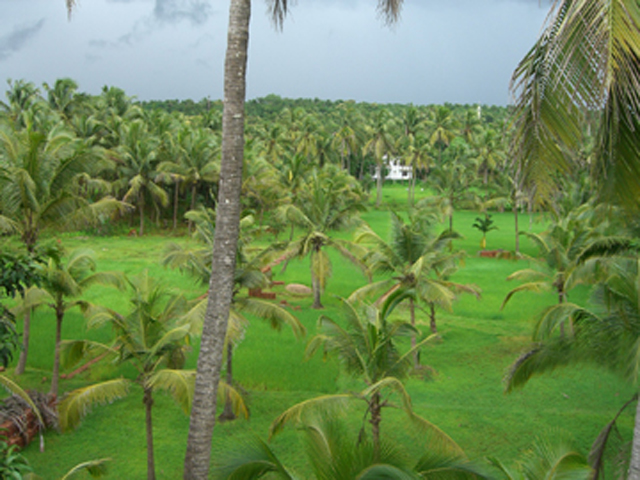

- Location in Kerala, India Punnakkulangara (India)
- Coordinates: 11.993148°N 75.3641939°E
- Country: India
- State: Kerala
- District: Kannur

Languages
  - Official: Malayalam, English
- Time zone: UTC+5:30 (IST)
- PIN: 670564
- Telephone code: +91 497
- ISO 3166 code: IN-KL
- Vehicle registration: KL-13, KL-59
- Nearest city: Taliparamba
- Lok Sabha constituency: Kannur
- Website: punnakkulangara.blogspot.com

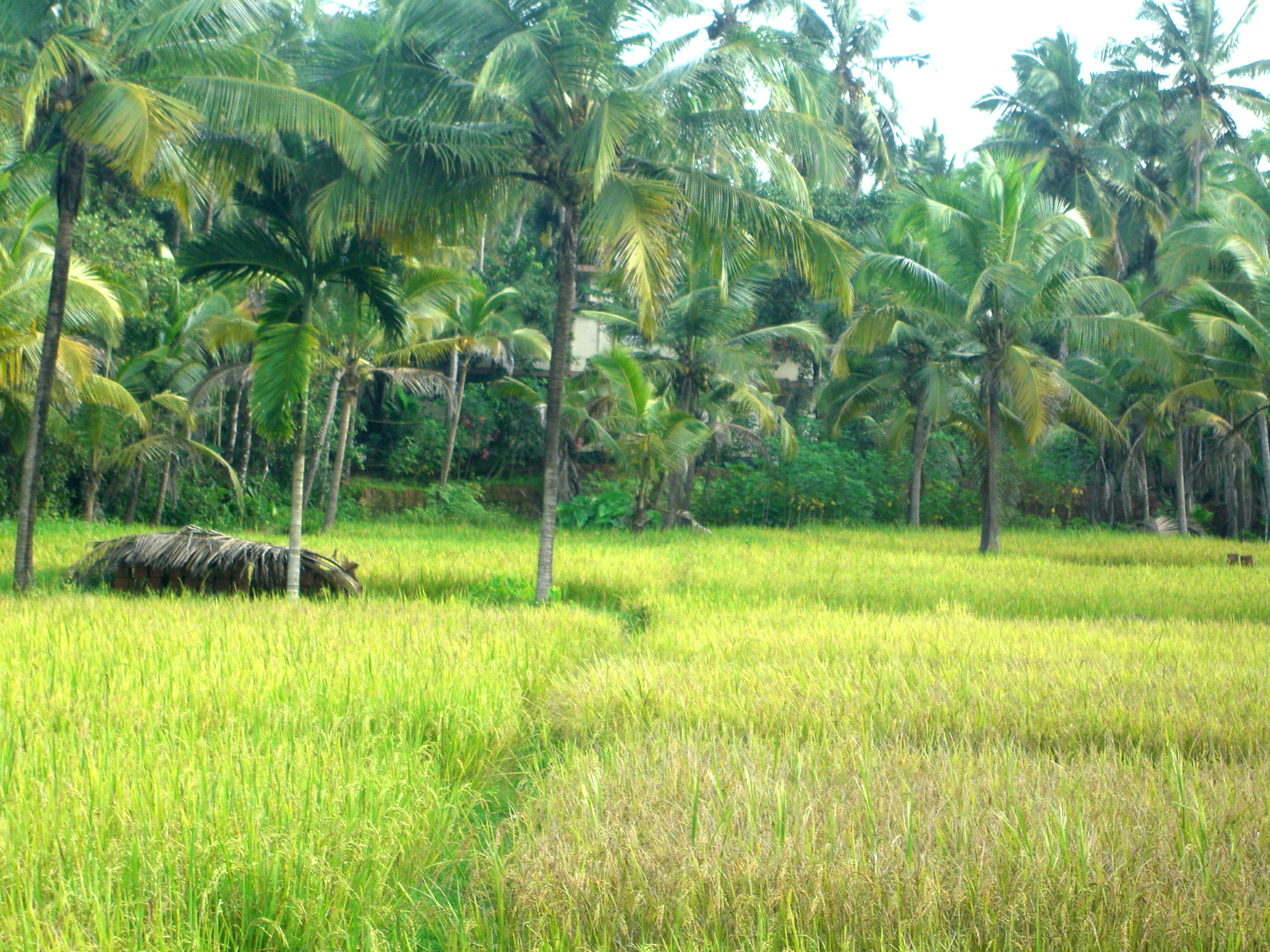
Paddy fields @ Punnakkulangara

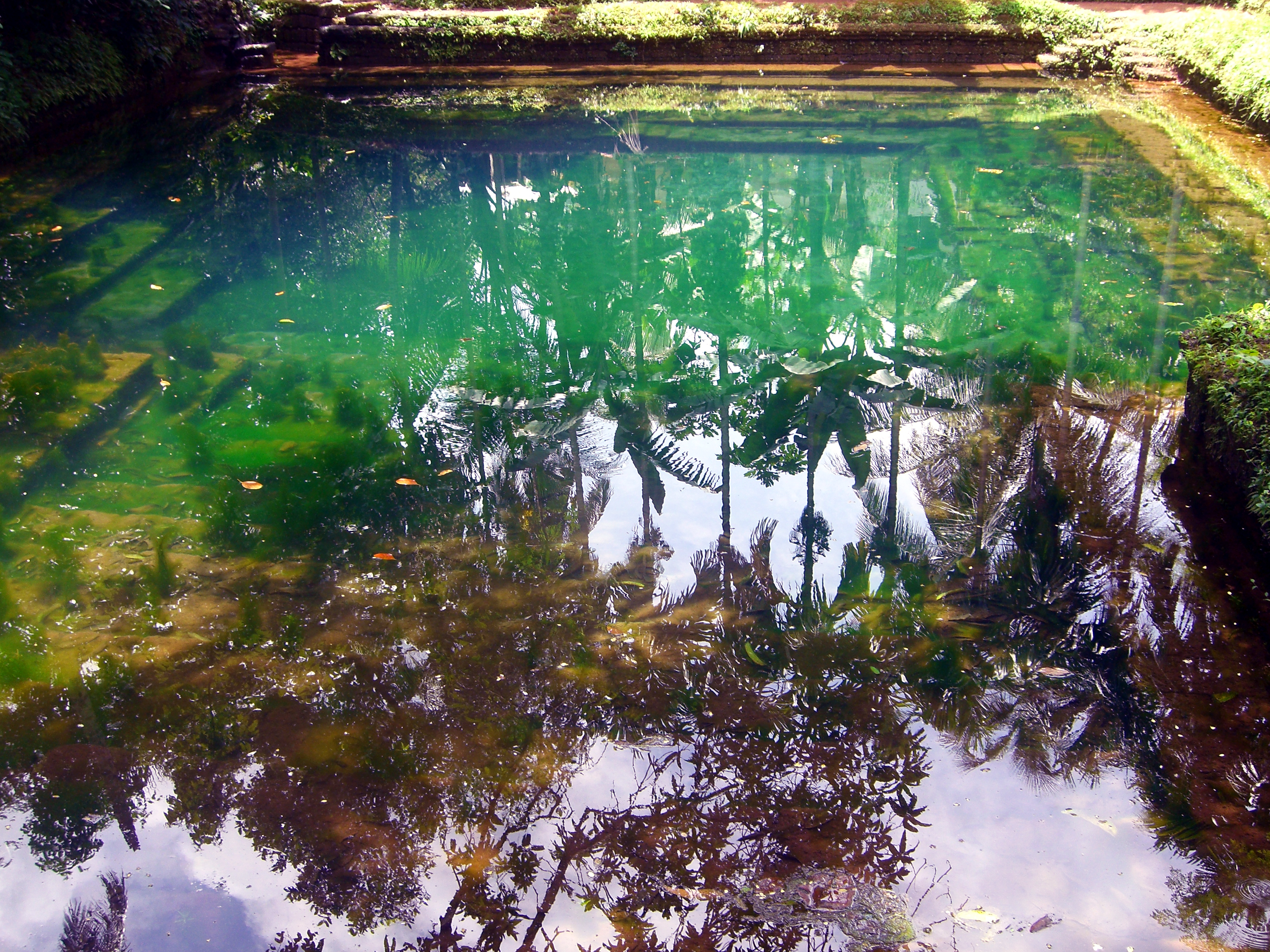
Neeliyar Kottam Pond

Punnakkulangara is a significant part as well as a Municipal Ward of Anthoor Municipality in Kannur district of Kerala, India.

== Location and Local Governance ==
Punnakkulangara is a village in North Malabar. It is situated in Anthoor Municipality of Kannur district. Punnakkulangara comes under the Morazha village.

Even though a small village, Punnakkulangara is surrounded by important places. Historic place of Independence Movement, Morazha, Bakkalam are situated around Punnakkulangara. Kannur University is situated south of Punnakkulangara. Kerala Armed Police IVth Battalion is the south east boundary of this village. Government College of Engineering, Kannur, Doordarshan Kannur Centre, KELTRON, Kannur, Parassinikkadavu Snake Park etc. are very near to this place.

== Demography ==
The demography of Punnakkulangara is of mixed nature. Hindus and Muslims are the dominant religions. Christians are also there. Among the Hindus most of them belongs to Thiyya caste.

== Education ==
Punnakkulangara has an almost 95% literacy rate. On average there is at least one graduate in every home. Most of the people attend Punnakkulangara Anganvaadi for preschool education. Almost 100% of the children used to go to schools. Most of the people attend government schools around Punnakkulangara like Morazha South A.L.P School, Morazha Central U.P. School, and Government Higher Secondary School Morazha. For higher secondary education, people largely rely upon Morazha Govt. Higher Secondary school and K.P.R Gopalan Smaraka Govt Higher Secondary School, Kalliasseri. There is no college in Punnakkulangara. People depends upon Private and parallel Colleges in and around Taliparamba, Kannur, Payyannur, and Cherukunnu.

== Economy ==
Agriculture was formerly a major activity in Punnakkulangara but has declined. Some residents continue to engage in farming, often as a secondary occupation. Paddy fields are located along the canal through the settlement, although some are no longer cultivated. Major crops include rice, coconut, areca nut, pepper, cashew, and seasonal crops.

Business and Industry - There is no industry in Punnakkulangara. Lot of people are engaged in small and medium business in Kerala and abroad also. It ranges from small scale trading to trading abroad.

== Vocation ==
A major portion of the population in Punnakkulnagara are labourers. The main fields which provides vocation to them are construction, agriculture (seasonal), etc. Co-operative sector is a large source of livelihood. This include Weavers co-operative societies like Kalliassery Weavers Ind. Co-op society, Morazha Weavers Ind Co-op Society, Kerala Dinesh Beedi Co-op Society, Indian Coffee House etc. One of the most important section is the people employed in other parts of India and abroad. Most of the Non resident are employed in Arabian countries. Another important area is Government sector. Many people are employed in Government offices, Schools, University etc. Nowadays people employed in IT and allied industries are also rising up. In Punnakkulangara also, rather than unemployment, underemployment is the main problem.

== Politics ==
Punnakkulangara is always been a fertile land for pro-proletarian forces. Many times, in the local body election there was no opposition. Punnakkulangara, 3rd ward of the former Anthoor Panchyath and 27th ward of former unified Taliparamba municipality, now 21st ward of Anthoor Municipality, never elected any non left member.

- Councillor - Kamala
- M.L.A. - M V Govindan Master
- M.P. - K Sudhakaran

== Transportation ==
The national highway passes through Dharmashala junction. Mangalore and Mumbai can be accessed on the northern side and Cochin and Thiruvananthapuram can be accessed on the southern side. The nearest railway stations are Kannapuram and Kannur on Mangalore-Palakkad line. There are airports at Mangalore and Calicut.

== See also ==
- Anthoor
- Morazha
- Parassinikkadavu
- Kannapuram
- Cherukunnu
- Kalliasseri
