= Kadambery =

- Village
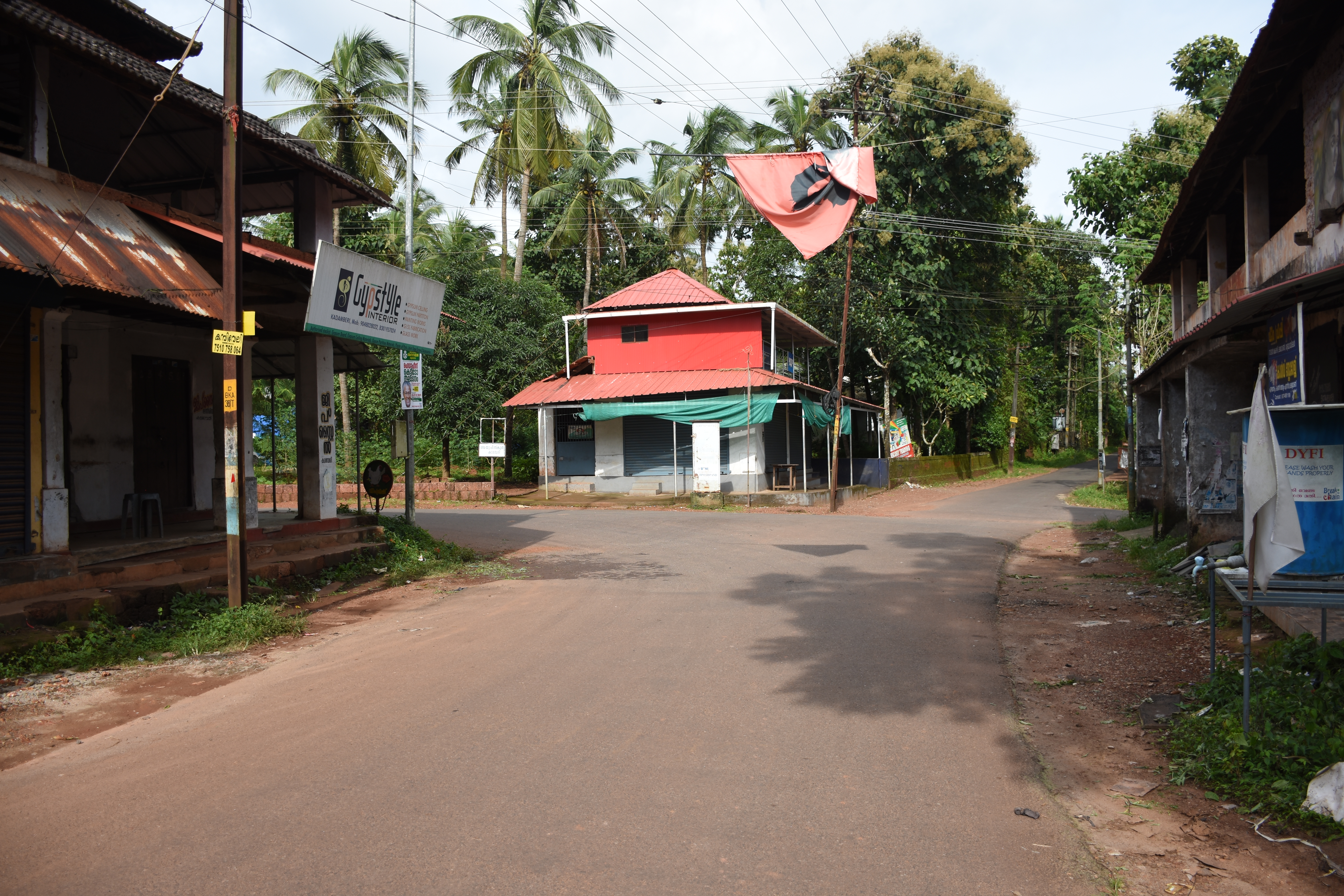
- Kadambery junction
- Country: India
- State: Kerala
- District: District

Languages
  - Official: Malayalam, English
- Time zone: UTC+5:30 (IST)
- PIN: 670562
- Vehicle registration: KL-13, KL-59
- Nearest city: Taliparamba
- Lok Sabha constituency: Kannur
- Climate: Tropical monsoon (Köppen)

Kadambery is a locality and municipal ward of the Anthoor Municipality in the Kannur district of Kerala in India

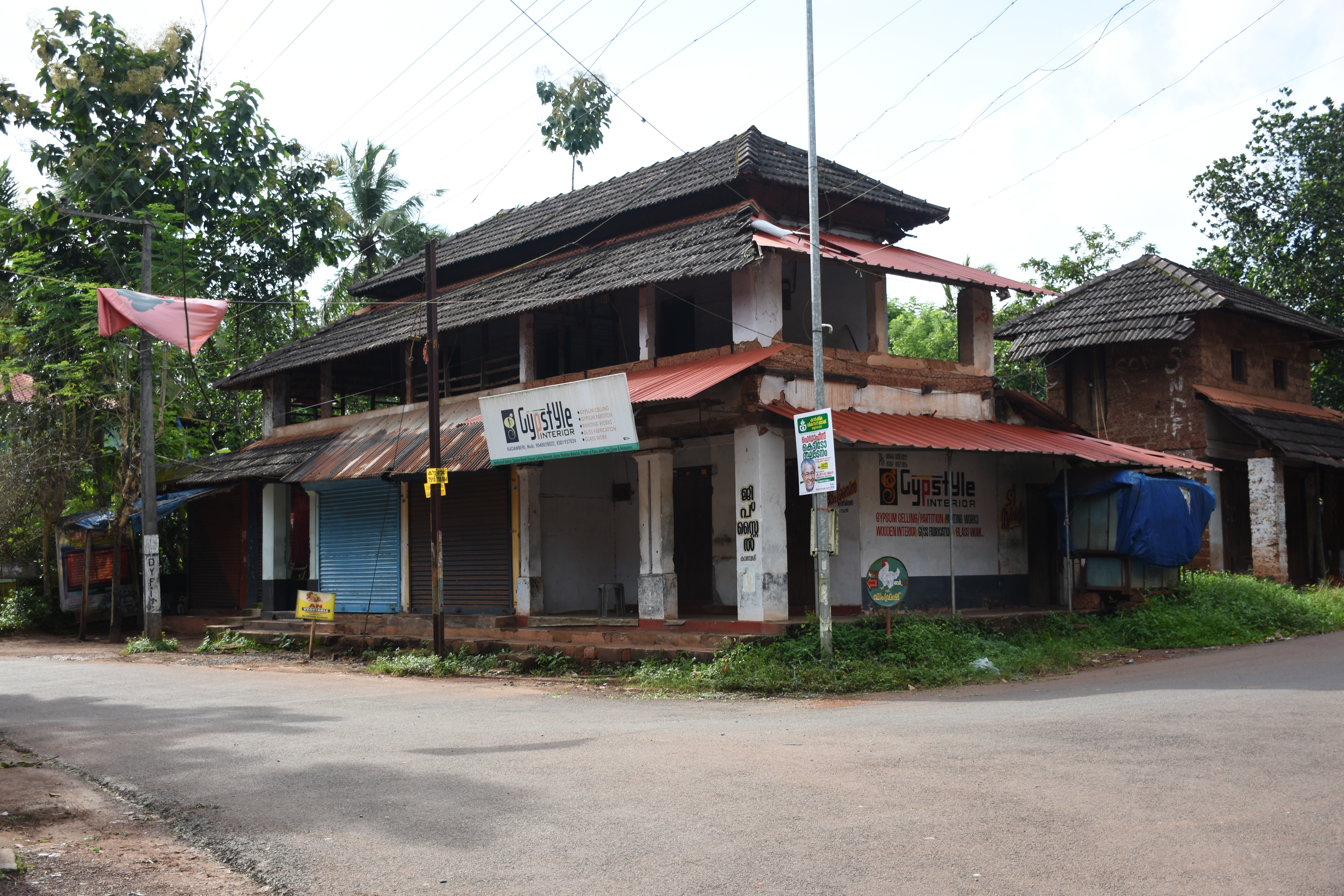
Kadambery junction

== Location and local governance ==
Kadambery is a village in North Malabar. It is situated in the Anthoor Municipality of the district of Kannur. Kadambery comes under the a village called Morazha.

Kadambery's neighbours are Bakkalam, Dharmashala and Peelery.

== Politics ==
Kadambery is the 9th Ward of Anthoor Municipality.

- Councillor - M KANNAN
- M.L.A. - M V Govindan Master
- M.P. - K. Sudhakaran

== Education ==
Kadambery A.L.P. School is in muthirakkal area of the village, and Kadambery Govt.U.P. School is situated in Ayyankol.

Government College of Engineering, Kannur and National Institute of Fashion Technology, Kannur are in Dharmashala, a neighbouring place of Kadambery

== C.R.C Public Library And Reading Room ==
founded in the 1950s the C.R.C is an active participant in the social activities of Kadambery village. which organises many Groups and activities like Balavedi, Yuvajana Kalasamithi etc. and arts and sports activities and training.

== History ==
=== Morazha Incident ===
Kadambery is a part of Morazha village where the Morazha incident of 1940 occurred. C.K Panikkar, P. Govindan Nair, P. Balakrishnan Nair where the main participants of morazha incident from Kadambery

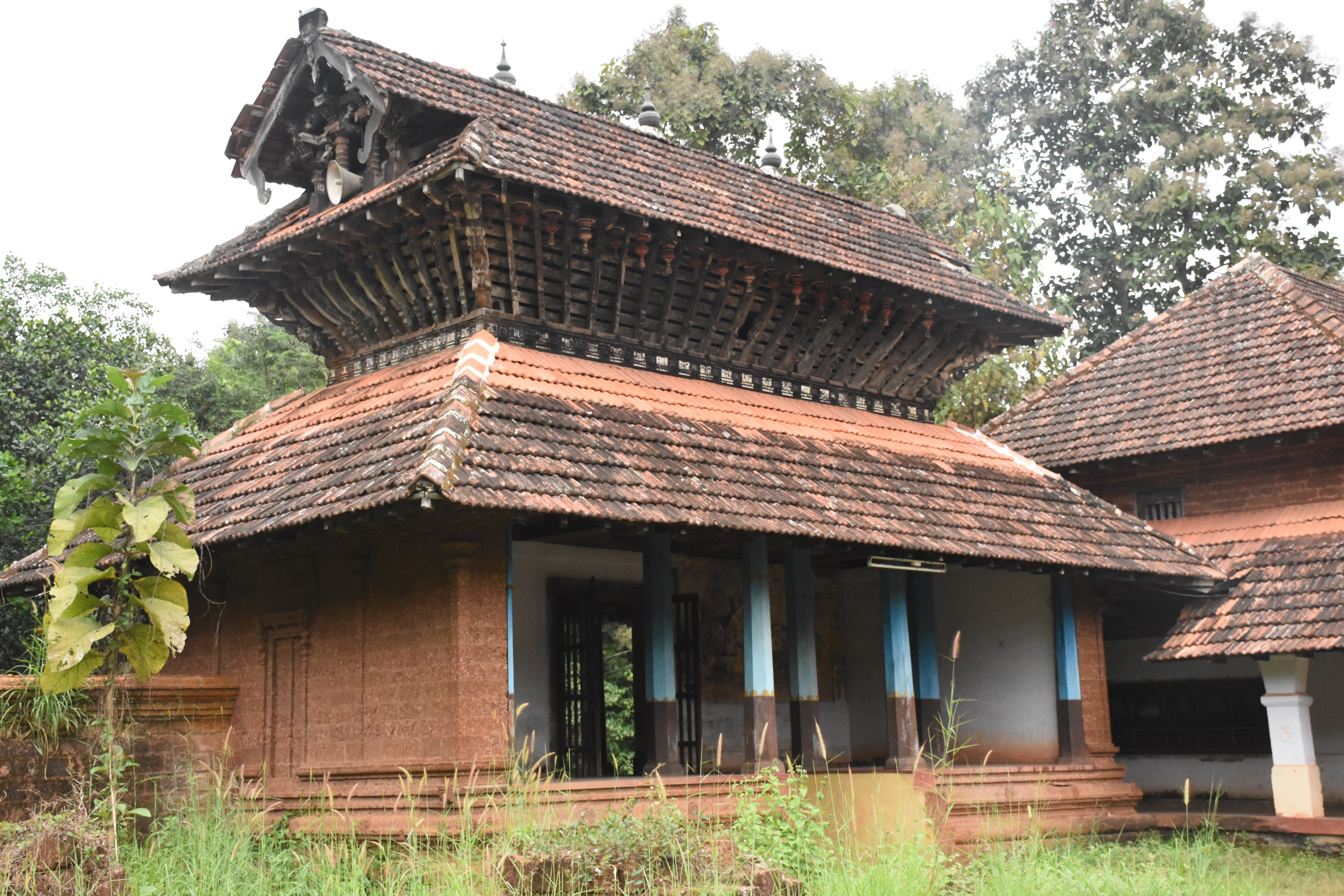
Kadambery Chuzhali Bhagavathi Temple

== Etymology ==
The name Kadambery is related to the myth of the Kadambery Chuzhali Bhagavathi Temple. A maiden from beyond the sea reached the sea shores of Cherukunnu. One day she reached the forest area of this village before nightfall. To spend the night she climbed a kadambu tree (ironwood); the place where the maiden climbed the kadambu tree became known as Kadamberi, which is a combination of two words: "kadambu" is a Malayalam name of a tree and "eari" means to climb. Later Kadamberi became Kadambery
