= Morazha =

- Village
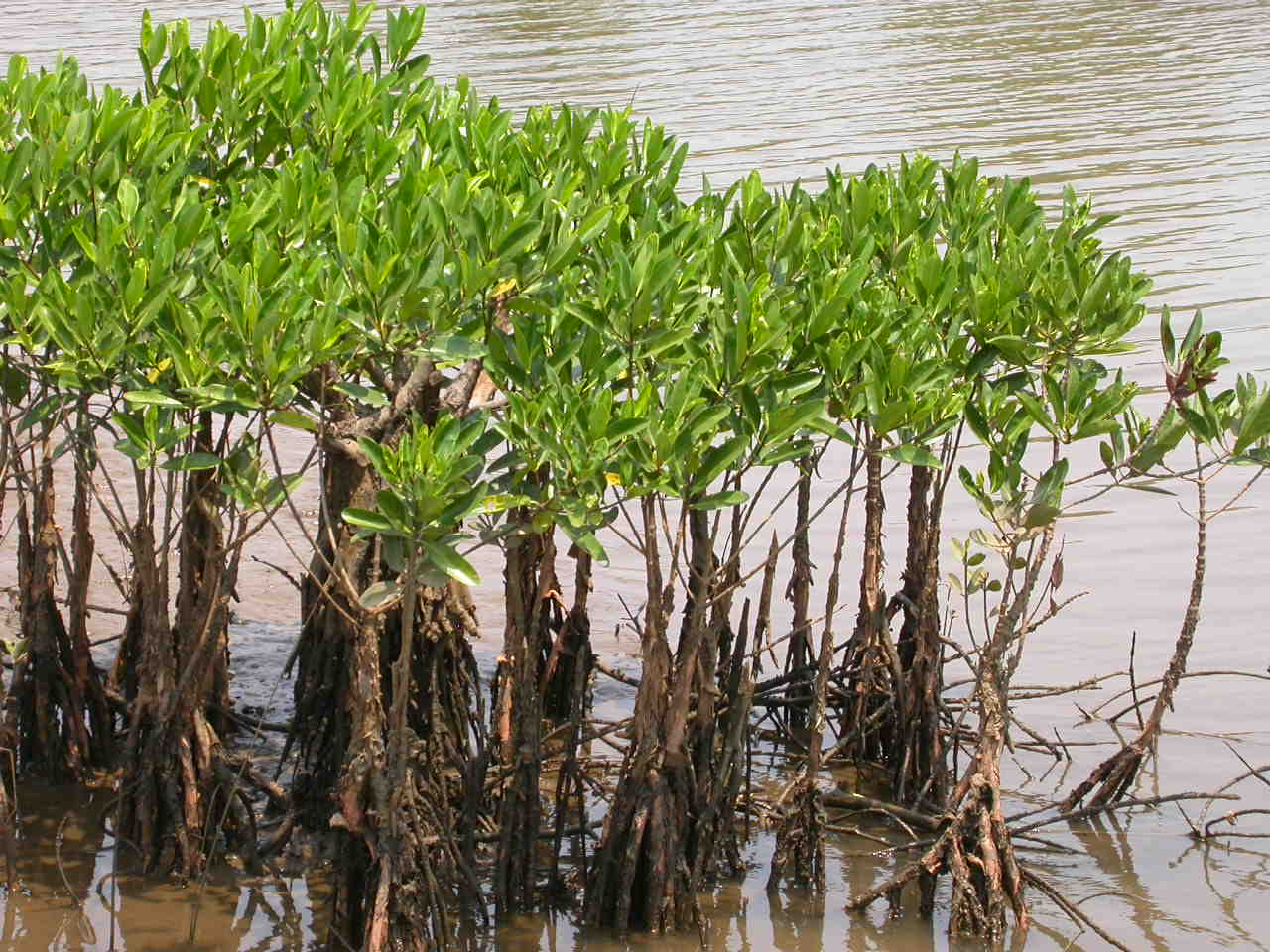
- Mangroves at Vellikkeel

- Location in Kerala, India Morazha (India)
- Coordinates: 11.987°N 75.349°E
- Country: India
- State: Kerala
- District: Kannur

Government
  - Body: Anthoor Municipality

Population (2001)
  - Total: 4,389

Languages
  - Official: Malayalam, English
- Time zone: UTC+5:30 (IST)
- PIN: 670331
- Telephone code: 0497278****
- ISO 3166 code: IN-KL
- Vehicle registration: KL-13, KL-59
- Sex ratio: 1073 ♂/♀
- Lok Sabha constituency: Kannur
- Vidhan Sabha constituency: Taliparamba
- Civic agency: Village

Morazha is a village of Anthoor Municipality in Kannur district in the Indian state of Kerala. Before formation of Anthoor Municipality this village was part of Thaliparamba Municipality. Though part of a Municipal Town, Morazha remains like a village.

The landscape of Morazha village comprises paddy fields and hilltop areas. This village has five major portions viz. Morazha Central, Vellikkeel, Panneri, Kanool and Punnakkulangara. While being part of a Municipal Town, the people of this village solely depends the towns in Cherukunnu and Kannapuram for their routine needs. Most of the people are employed at said towns.

== Geography ==
Morazha is located at 11.987°N 75.349°E. It has an average elevation of 1 metres (3 feet).

== Demographics ==
According to the 2001 India census, Morazha had a population of 4, 389.

== History ==
=== Morazha Protest ===
The KPCC called the people of Malabar to observe Anti-Imperialist Day on 15 September 1940. It was disapproved by the High Command of Congress, but meetings and demonstrations were held in North Malabar area on that day. The centre of this agitation was Morazha. Two young men and 23 others were killed in a clash between a mob and a police party at Morazha. The young men were two police officers Sub-Inspector K.M Kuttikrishna Menon and Constable Raman. Communist leader K.P.R. Gopalan was sentenced to death for murder in connection with this incident, but due to pressure from Mahatma Gandhi and others, the sentence was never carried out. The Quit India Movement also echoed in Morazha. A socialist group among the Congress workers under K.B. Menon, provided leadership to the movement.

== Tourist attractions ==
- Vellikkeel eco-tourism
- Morazha Shiva Temple
- Sree Vaneeswari Temple
- Ozhakrome Temple
- Edappara Temple
- CH Kanaran Smaraka Vayana Sala
- Panneri Kavu
- Kairali Vaayanasala, Vellikkeel
- Vellikkeel river
- Vellikkeel cultural center
- Karshaka Vayanashala & Granthalayam, Paliyathuvalappu
- Athikulangara Temple, Paliyathuvalappu
- Panthottam Siva Temple
- Edakkeppravan Muthappan Temple
- C H Narayanan Master Smaraka Vayansala Kuttancheri

== Education ==
- Kannur University
- Morazha Co-op Arts college
- Morazha A.U.P. School
- Morazha Central UP School
- Govt. Higher Secondary School, Morazha
- Morazha UP School
- Kanool LP school (vellikkeel)
- Gem International School
- Morazha South A. L. P. School

== Entertainment ==
- Vismaya Park
- Parassinikadav
- Snake Park
- Vellikkeel Eco-tourism

== Transportation ==
The national highway passes through Dharmashala junction. Mangalore and Mumbai can be accessed on the northern side and Cochin and Thiruvananthapuram can be accessed on the southern side. The road to the east connects to Mysore and Bangalore. The nearest railway stations are Kannapuram and Kannur on Mangalore-Palakkad line. There are airports at Kannur, Mangalore and Calicut. All of them are international airports but direct flights are available only to Middle Eastern countries.

== See also ==
- Anthoor
- Parassinikkadavu
- Kannapuram
- Cherukunnu
- Kalliasseri
- Punnakkulangara
