= Irinave =

Irinave ഇരിണാവ്
- Village
- Location in Kerala, India Irinave (India)
- Coordinates: 11.99°N 75.42°E
- Country: India
- State: Kerala
- District: Kannur

Government
  - Body: Village

Population (2011)
  - Total: 4,986

Languages
  - Official: Malayalam, English
- Time zone: UTC+5:30 (IST)
- PIN: 670301
- Telephone code: 0497286****
- ISO 3166 code: IN-KL
- Vehicle registration: KL-13
- Sex ratio: 1059 ♂/♀
- Lok Sabha constituency: Kasaragod
- Vidhan Sabha constituency: Kalliasseri
- Civic agency: Village

Irinave is a village of Kalliasseri Panchayat in Kannur district in the Indian state of Kerala.

This village is located completely on sandy paddy towards south of Kannapuram in Kannur District in Kerala.

== Geography ==
Irinave is located at 11.99°N 75.42°E. It has an average elevation of 1 metres (3 feet).

== Demographics ==
According to the 2011 India census, Irinave had a population of 4,986.

== Etymology ==
Irinave means two shores.

== History ==
Irinave, as part of Kannapuram area, was under Chera rule and then Nannan-Mushaka-Kolathiri rule throughout recorded history for many millennia. In 1800 CE or so The British Raj attached this area to Pappinisseri Desam of Chirakkal Taluk of Malabar District in Madras Presidency. Presently this is a village in Kalliasseri Panchayat of Kannur District of Kerala State.

== Transportation ==
The national highway passes through Taliparamba town. Goa and Mumbai can be accessed on the northern side and Cochin and Thiruvananthapuram can be accessed on the southern side. The road to the east of Iritty connects to Mysore and Bangalore. The nearest railway station is Kannapuram on Mangalore-Palakkad line. Trains are available to almost all parts of India subject to advance booking over the internet. There are airports at Kannur, Mangalore and Calicut. All of them are international airports but direct flights are available only to Middle Eastern countries.
