= Nadhikalil Sundari Yamuna =

2023 Indian comedy-drama film

- Theatrical release poster
- Directed by: Vijesh Panathur; Unni Vellora
- Written by: Vijesh Panathur; Unni Vellora
- Produced by: Vilas Kumar; Simi Murali Kunnumpurath
- Starring: Dhyan Sreenivasan; Aju Varghese; Pragya Nagra
- Cinematography: Faisal Ali
- Edited by: Rathin Radhakrishnan
- Music by: Arun Muraleedharan (songs); Sankar Sharma (score)
- Production company: Cinematica Films LLP
- Distributed by: Crescent Release
- Release date: 15 September 2023
- Running time: 129 minutes
- Country: India
- Language: Malayalam

Nadhikalil Sundari Yamuna (transl. Yamuna, the prettiest among rivers) is a 2023 Indian Malayalam-language comedy-drama film written and directed by Vijesh Panathur and Unni Vellora (in their directorial debut). Set in Kadambery, the narrative unfolds the conflict between Kannan (Dhyan Sreenivasan) and Vidhyadharan (Aju Varghese) regarding their matrimony, and the subsequent chain of events. The film also features Pragya Nagra (in her Malayalam debut), Sudheesh, Kalabhavan Shajohn, Sohan Seenulal, Nirmal Palazhi and Aneesh Gopal in significant roles.

Principal photography began in October 2022 in Taliparamba. The songs were composed by Arun Muraleedharan, while the background score was provided by Sankar Sharma. The cinematography and editing were handled by Faisal Ali and Rathin Radhakrishnan. Nadhikalil Sundari Yamuna was released on 15 September 2023 to mixed reviews from critics and became a commercial success.

== Plot ==
Kannan is a 35-year-old unmarried native of Kadambery and works at a BEVCO outlet. His family consists of his mother Narayani, sister Haritha and uncle Bhaskaran. One day, Kannan is attacked by a bull in front of his house and, as a result, breaks his arm. Ravi, Kannan's friend, visits him at home and advises him to get married soon.

Sudhakaran, the local secretary of a political party and Kannan's friend, comes up with a marriage proposal. On the wedding day, Kannan's friend Mahesh plays a video on his phone of Kannan and pig farm owner Mary as a prank. The marriage was called off once everyone learned about the matter. Kannan's friends suspect Vidhyadharan, a bachelor who owns a textile shop in Kadambery, is behind it. Kannan and his friends clash with Vidhyadharan and his friends on the issue. Sudhakaran challenges that they will arrange a marriage for Kannan within two weeks.

Kannan's marriage proposals are blocked by Vidhyadharan's friends, and similarly, Kannan's friends block the marriage proposals of Vidhyadharan. RC, a party worker and a friend of Kannan and Sudhakaran who runs a shop in Coorg, arranges a marriage proposal for Kannan from there. Kannan and his friends travel to Coorg to see RC at the instruction of Gopalan, a senior member of the local political party. The next day, Kannan marries Yamuna, a Kannadathi. After reaching home, Kannan and his family realize that Yamuna doesn't speak Malayalam, causing communication problems. Kannan gets irritated as Yamuna starts to develop a relationship with Vidhyadharan, who can speak Kannada. On Gopalan's instructions, Kannan's friends hide some weapons in Vidhyadharan's shop with the help of some party workers and inform the police.

Upon finding weapons in the shop, the police arrest Vidhyadharan. After realizing that the political party was behind it, the police let Vidhyadharan go. On his return, Vidhyadharan is beaten up by Kannan's friends and asked to leave the place. Following the issue, Vidhyadharan, his mother and friends reach Kannan's house to question him. Vidhyadharan's mother tells everyone that her son is in love with a girl. Kannan misunderstands that the girl mentioned is his wife, Yamuna. Everyone realizes that the girl mentioned by Vidhyadharan's mother is actually Kannan's sister, Haritha. While everyone is discussing Vidhyadharan's issue, Kannan's uncle Bhaskaran arrives with a Rajasthani woman. Kannan and Vidhyadharan catch up and later reconciles with Yamuna, who has started to speak Malayalam.

== Cast ==
- Dhyan Sreenivasan as Kannan
- Aju Varghese as Vidhyadharan
- Pragya Nagra as Yamuna
- Sudheesh as Bhaskaran
- Kalabhavan Shajohn as RC
- Sohan Seenulal as Prabhakaran
- Nirmal Palazhi as Sudhakaran
- Unni Raja as Ravi
- Navas Vallikkunnu as Shamsu
- Aneesh Gopal as Chandran
- Vilas Kumar as Sub-inspector
- Rajesh Azhikodan as Balan
- Devaraj Kozhikode as Gopi
- Bhanumathi Payyanur as Narayani
- Gopalan Cheemeni as Gopalan
- Gopi as Ambu
- Aami as Haritha
- Sarath Lal as Danesh
- Prajeesh as Sudheesh
- Kiran Remeshan as Mahesh
- Beena Kodakkadu as Prasanna
- Jeevesh as Jinto
- Vismaya as Sherly
- Jaya Sujith as Omana
- Parwana as Shilpa
- Usha as Vidhyadharan's mother

== Production ==
=== Filming ===
Principal photography began on 8 October 2022 with a pooja ceremony held at Trichambaram Temple in Taliparamba. The switch-on ceremony was performed by Baiju Santosh and the first clap was given by T. V. Rajesh. The filming took place in and around Taliparamba and Payyanur.

== Soundtrack ==
The songs are composed by Arun Muraleedharan, while the background score is provided by Sankar Sharma. The lyrics are written by Manu Manjith and B. K. Harinarayanan. The audio rights are obtained by Saregama. The first song titled "Konnadi Penne" was released on 25 June 2023, sung by Dhyan Sreenivasan in his debut as a playback singer. A recreated version of the song "Vellara Poomala Mele" from Varavelpu (1989) was released on 26 August 2023.

Track listing
No.	Title	Lyrics	Singer(s)	Length
1.	"Konnadi Penne"	Manu Manjith	Dhyan Sreenivasan	2:59
2.	"Puthunaambukal"	Manu Manjith	Arun Muraleedharan	2:30
3.	"Vellara Poomala Mele" (Revisited)	Kaithapram	Unni Menon	4:30
4.	"Pennu Kandu Nadannu Theyana"	Manu Manjith	Sannidhananthan & Sachin Raj R.	1:37
5.	"Kayampoovin Kannil"	B. K. Harinarayanan	Arvind Venugopal & Gayathry Rajiv	3:03
6.	"Kanninu Kann"	Manu Manjith	Vineeth Sreenivasan & Jithin Raj	2:30
Total length:				17:09

== Release ==
=== Theatrical ===
The film was given a U certificate by the Central Board of Film Certification prior to its release. It was released in theatres on 15 September 2023 by Crescent Release through Cinematica Films.

=== Home media ===
Highrich OTT acquired the digital rights and began streaming it on 23 October 2023.

== Reception ==
=== Box office ===
Nadhikalil Sundari Yamuna has grossed $10,939 in the United Kingdom and $30,563 in the United Arab Emirates, totaling $41,502 in international earnings.

=== Critical response ===
Athira M. of The Hindu wrote "The Dhyan Sreenivasan-Aju Varghese combination shines in 'Nadikalil Sundari Yamuna' but the situational humour lacks punch, with the local dialect managing to save some scenes." Anjana George of The Times of India gave 3 out of 5 stars and wrote "Overall, this feel-good family entertainer relies on strong performances, humor, and captivating music to compensate for its weak script." Princy Alexander of Onmanorama wrote "It's not that 'Nadikalil Sundari Yamuna' is a perfect entertainer, but it is quiet refreshing that the makers have not tried too hard to make the comedy work. While the film may suffer from some cliches, the flow in the narrative and the humour ensure these shortcomings can be overlooked."

Vignesh Madhu of The New Indian Express gave 2.5 out of 5 stars and wrote "In their debut outing, writer-director duo Vijesh Panathur and Unni Vellora, don't have a lot of freshness to offer, but if the objective was to follow the formulaic approach and deliver a decent entertainer, well, they seem to have got it right." Raymond John Kuriachan of OTTPlay gave 3 out of 5 stars and wrote "Nadhikalil Sundari Yamuna offers nothing new, apart from an old template story coupled with outdated writing. With some laughs here and there, the performances of Aju Varghese and Dhyan Sreenivasan are the only appealing aspects of this passable comedy-drama." Arjun Ramachandran of The South First gave 3 out of 5 stars and wrote "Nadikalil Sundari Yamuna is a light-hearted entertainer and aims at the family audience. In that way, the makers have done justice."
