= Anthoor =

- Municipality
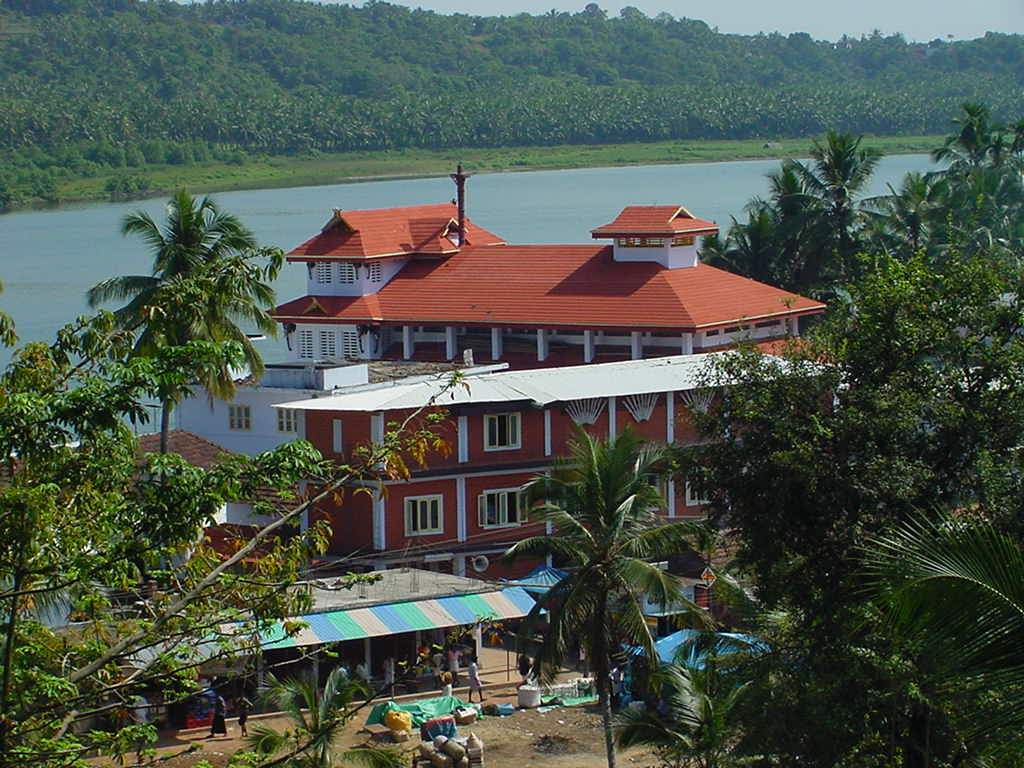
- Parassinikkadavu Sree Muthappan Temple

- Location in Kerala, India Anthoor (India)
- Coordinates: 11.987°N 75.376°E
- Country: India
- State: Kerala
- District: Kannur
- Taluk: Taliparamba
- Municipality: 2015

Government
  - Type: Grade 3 Municipality
  - Body: Anthoor Municipality

Area
  - Total: 24.12 km^{2} (9.31 sq mi)

Population (2011)
  - Total: 28,218
  - Density: 1,170/km^{2} (3,030/sq mi)

Languages
  - Official: Malayalam, English
- Time zone: UTC+5:30 (IST)
- PIN: 670563
- Kerala Legislative Assembly: Taliparamba
- Lok Sabha: Kannur

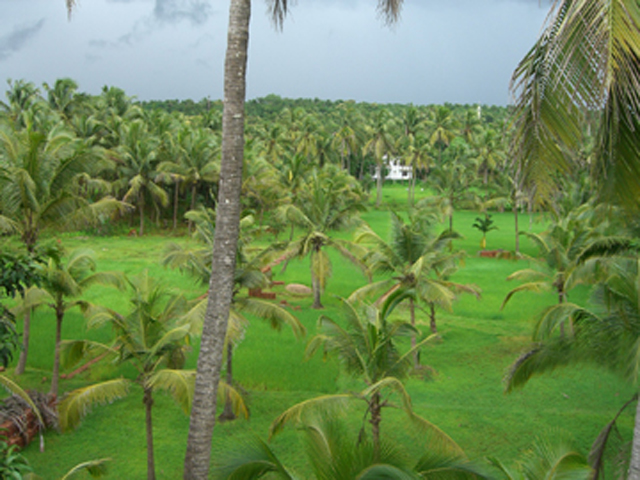
Fields near Punnakkulangara

Anthoor (IPA: [aːn̪t̪uːr]) is a municipality, in Taliparamba taluk of the Kannur district in Kerala, India. The municipality had a population of 28,218 in the 2011 Indian census.

Anthoor is situated on the western bank of the Valapattanam River. Anthoor is located approximately 6 km (3.7 mi) south of the taluk headquarters, Taliparamba and 16 km (9.9 mi) north of the district headquarters, Kannur.

== Etymology ==
The name Anthoor means "large village." Due to its large size, the town was split into two villages, Anthoor and Morazha. The hill of Anthoor has been mentioned in many Theyyam folk songs and Thottam Pattu (തോറ്റം പാട്ട്).

== History ==
Anthoor was previously under Kolathiri rule. Later, Tipu Sultan adjoined this area as part of the Kingdom of Mysore. During British Raj, the kingdom was under Chirakkal Taluk of Malabar District in the Madras Presidency. After the formation of the Kerala State, this area was made a panchayat in the Cannanore District. Later, the Anthoor Panchayat was merged with the Taliparambu Municipality upon the latter's formation. Presently, Anthoor is an independent municipality of Kannur District of Kerala State.

== Geography ==
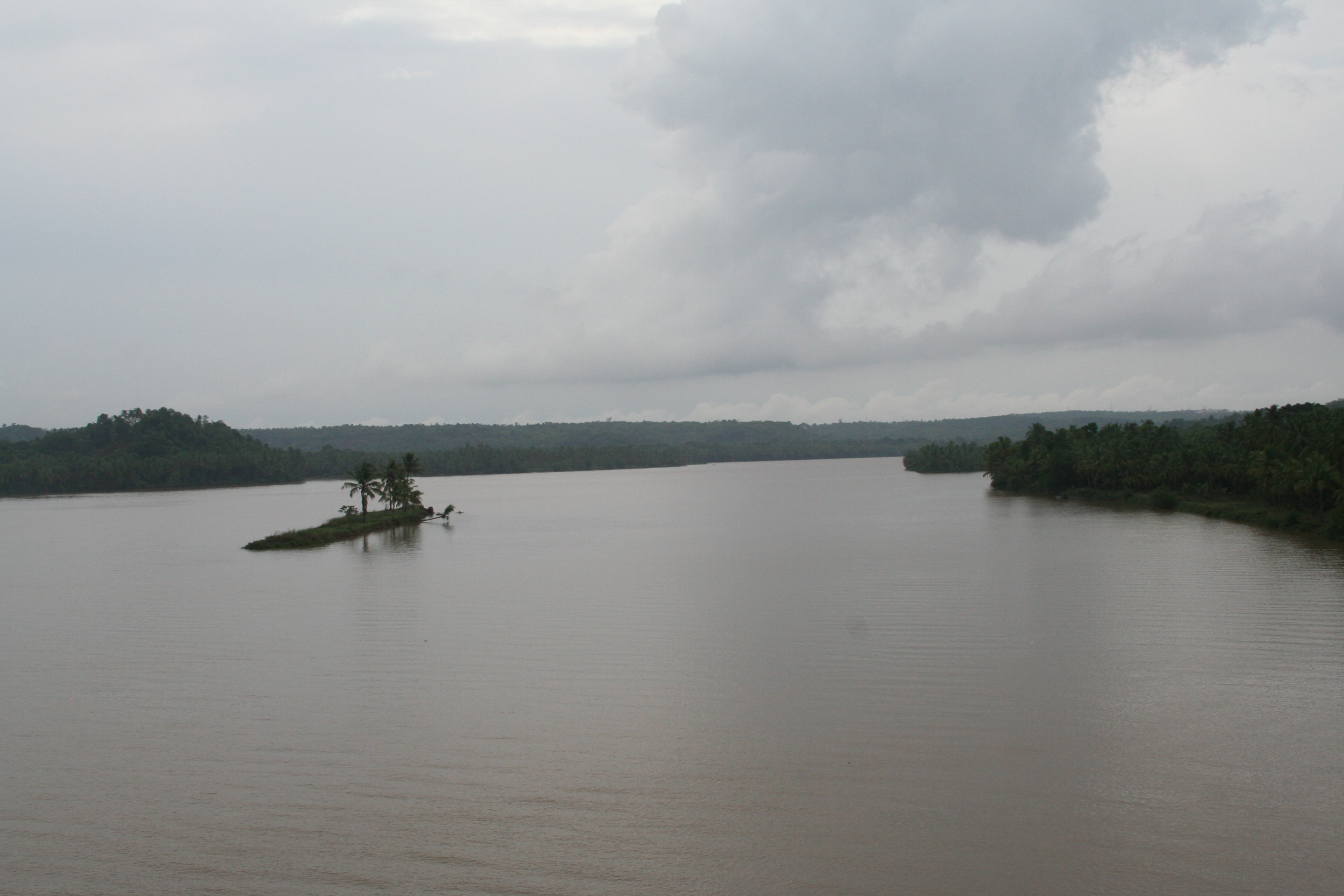
The Valappattanam River, near Parassinikadavu

Almost half of Anthoor's border is surrounded by two scenic rivers, the Valapattanam Puzha and the Kuttikkol Puzha. The backwaters at Vellikkeel Eco Tourism Park are a tourist spot.

Anthoor shares borders with Taliparamba and Kurumathur to the north, Kalliasseri and Pappinisseri to the south, Kannapuram to the west, and Mayyil, Kolachery, and Narath to the east.

== Governance ==
Anthoor is part of the Taliparamba Assembly constituency, and the Kannur Lok Sabha constituency. Prior to 1990, Anthoor was a gram panchayath consisting of two villages: Morazha and Anthoor. After the reorganisation of municipalities in 1990, Anthoor was merged with Taliparamba to form a new municipality. In 2015, Taliparamba was bifurcated into two new municipalities- Anthoor and Talipparamba.

Anthoor has generally been a municipality where the CPI-M has dominated. 14 out of 28 of the municipal councillors were elected unopposed. The current Municipal Chairperson is P. Mukundan.

=== Municipal Wards ===
Anthoor Municipality is composed of following 28 wards:

Ward no.	Name	Ward no.	Name	Ward no.	Name	Ward no.	Name
1	Vellikkeel	2	Morazha	3	Kanool	4	Mundapram
5	Mayilade	6	Bakkalam	7	Peelery	8	Kadambery
9	Ayyankol	10	Kolmotta	11	Nanichery	12	Kodallur
13	Mambala	14	Parassinikkadavu	15	Kovval	16	Anthoor
17	Thaliyil	18	Podikkund	19	Thalivayal	20	Dharmashala
21	Punnakkulangara	22	Kuttipram	23	C H Nagar	24	Ozhacrom
25	Anchampeedika	26	Veniyil	27	Paliyathuvalappu	28	Panneri

== Demographics ==
According to the 2011 India Census, Anthoor had a population of 28,218 with 12,527 men and 15,691 women.

== Notable people ==
- M.V. Govindan - Politician

== Transport ==
The National Highway-66 passes through the Dharmashala junction. Mangalore and Mumbai can be accessed on the northern side, and Cochin and Thiruvananthapuram can be accessed on the southern side. The nearest railway stations are Kannapuram and Kannur on the Mangalore-Palakkad line. There are airports at Kannur International Airport, Mangaluru Airport and Calicut International Airport.
