= Balan Nambiar =

Indian academic researcher (born 1937)

- Balan Nambiar during Kathakali festival at Mridangasyleshwari Temple 2026
- Born: 12 November 1937 (age 89); Kannapuram, Madras Presidency, British India
- Known for: Paintings, sculptures, researches on ritual art
- Notable work: Valampiri Shanka, The Sky is the Limit
- Awards: India National award for sculpture, Nehru fellowship for research

Balan Nambiar (born 12 November 1937 in Kannapuram) is an Indian painter, sculptor, enamellist, photographer and an academic researcher.

== Biography ==
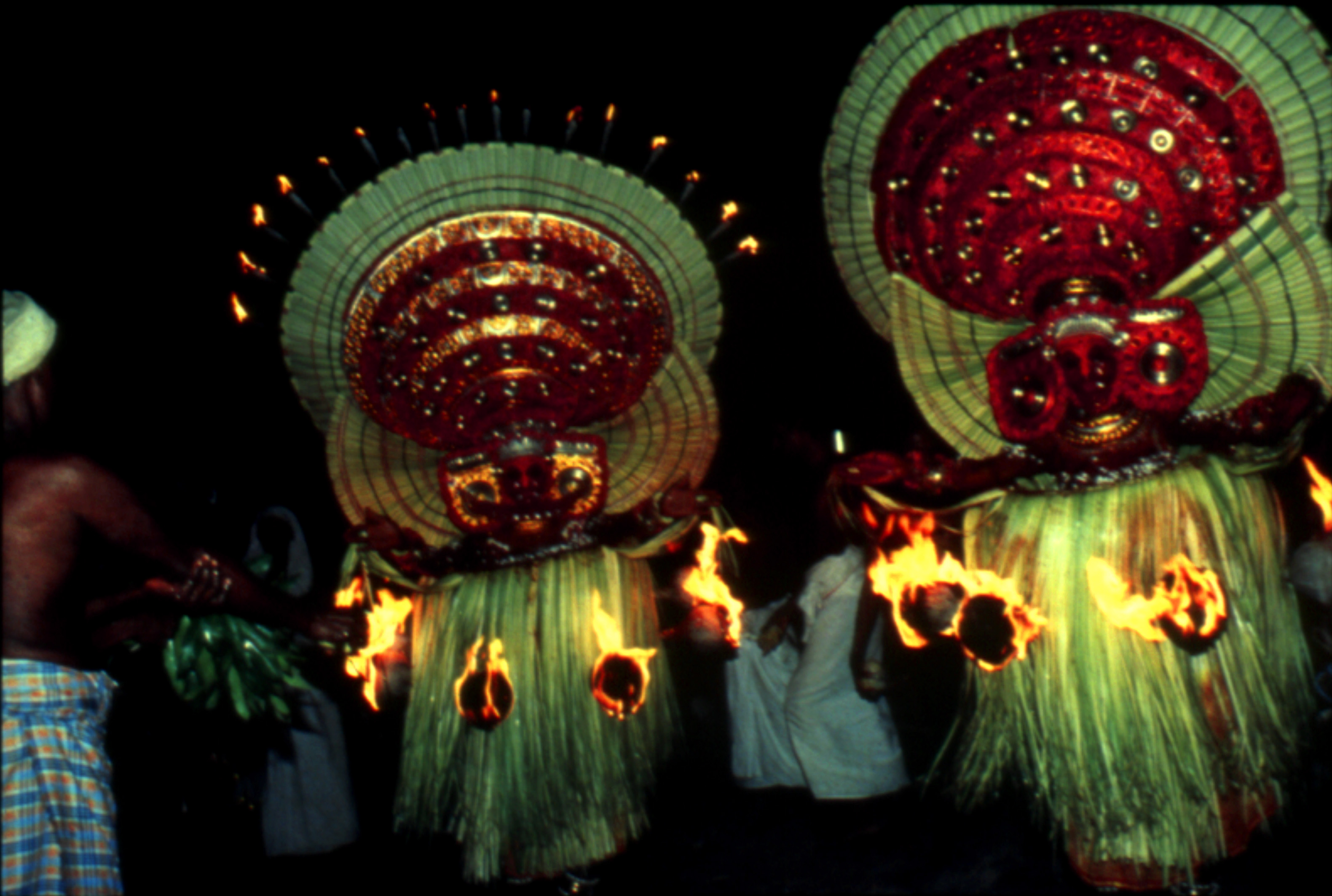
Kadamkottu Makkam and Chiru Teyyams

As a sculptor he worked with clay, fiberglass reinforced concrete, wood, bronze, mild steel and, from 2000, stainless steel. Many of his works are outdoor sculptures; some are monumental. He produced enamel paintings, having learned the technique from Paolo De Poli of Padua, Italy. His creative works were exhibited in national and international art exhibitions, including Venice Biennale in 1982, Constructa-78 in Hannover in 1978, Triennale India in New Delhi in 1975. Works by him are in the permanent collection of many museums.

Balan Nambiar has extensively studied, photographed and documented hundreds of ritual performances and art forms of the Indian west coast as Teyyam and Bhuta. Articles and photographs by him are published in books. Around 1800 of his photographs have been acquired by the Indira Gandhi National Centre for Arts, New Delhi.

He received awards both for creative works and academic research: India National Award in 1981 and Karnataka State Award in 1980 of Lalit Kala Academy (National Academy of Fine Arts) for his sculptures, Senior Fellowship of the India Ministry of Culture in 1982–83 and Nehru Fellowship of Jawaharlal Nehru Memorial Fund in 1983–85 for academic research, Academy Fellowship of the Kerala Lalitha Kala Academy in 2005 for creative works, Pravasi Kalaratna Fellowship of Kerala Sangeetha Nataka Akademi in 2013 for painting. The Government of Kerala awarded him the 2014 Raja Ravi Verma Puraskaram, the highest state award in the art category, in 2015. National Gallery of Modern Art, Bangalore held the retrospective of six decades of work by Nambiar in February 2018, which was curated by Sadanand Menon

He has been chairman of the Lalit Kala Academi, New Delhi, member of the General Council of Lalit Kala Academy, member of the Central Advisory Board on Culture, India.

== Major works ==
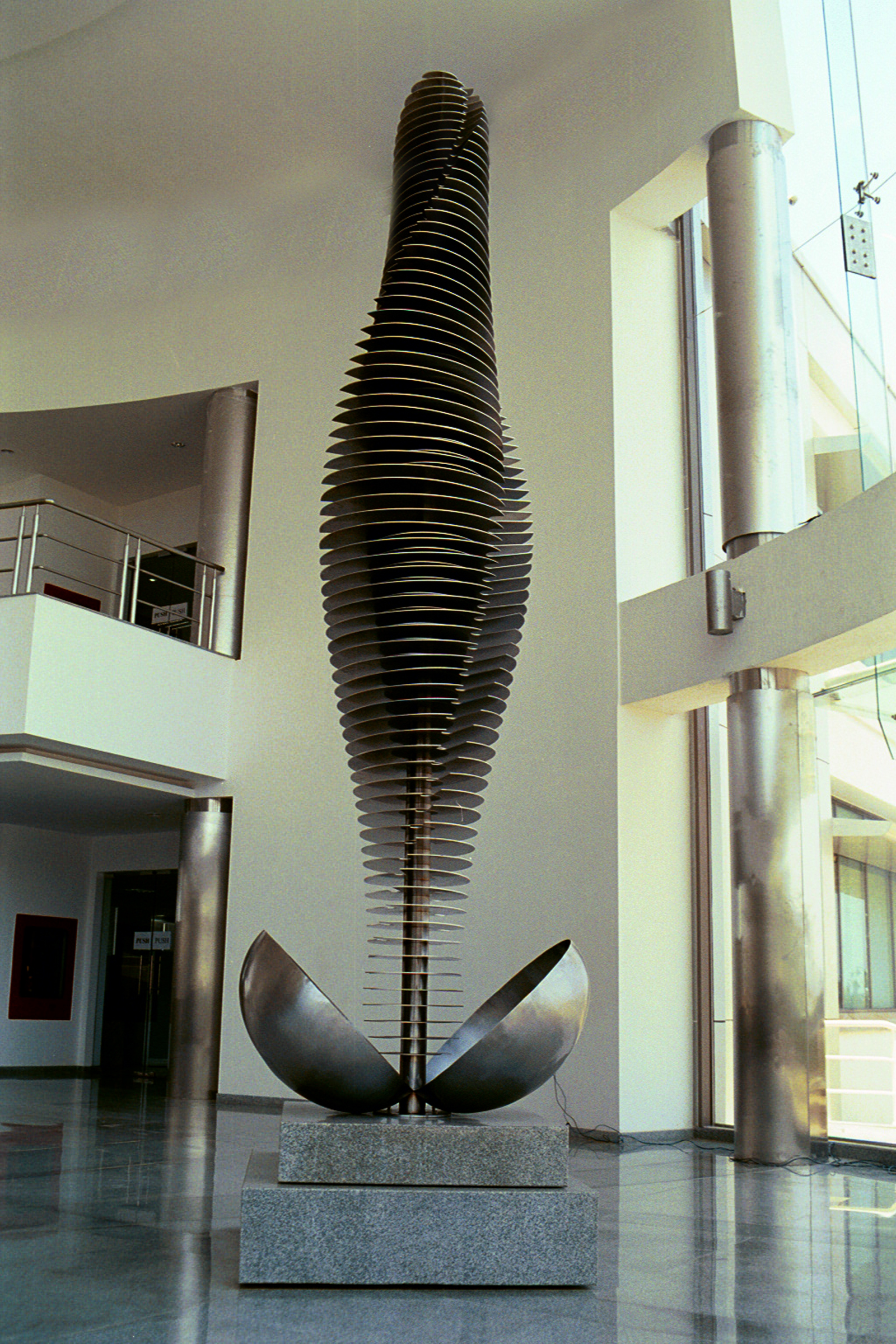
Sculpture for Timken, 2004

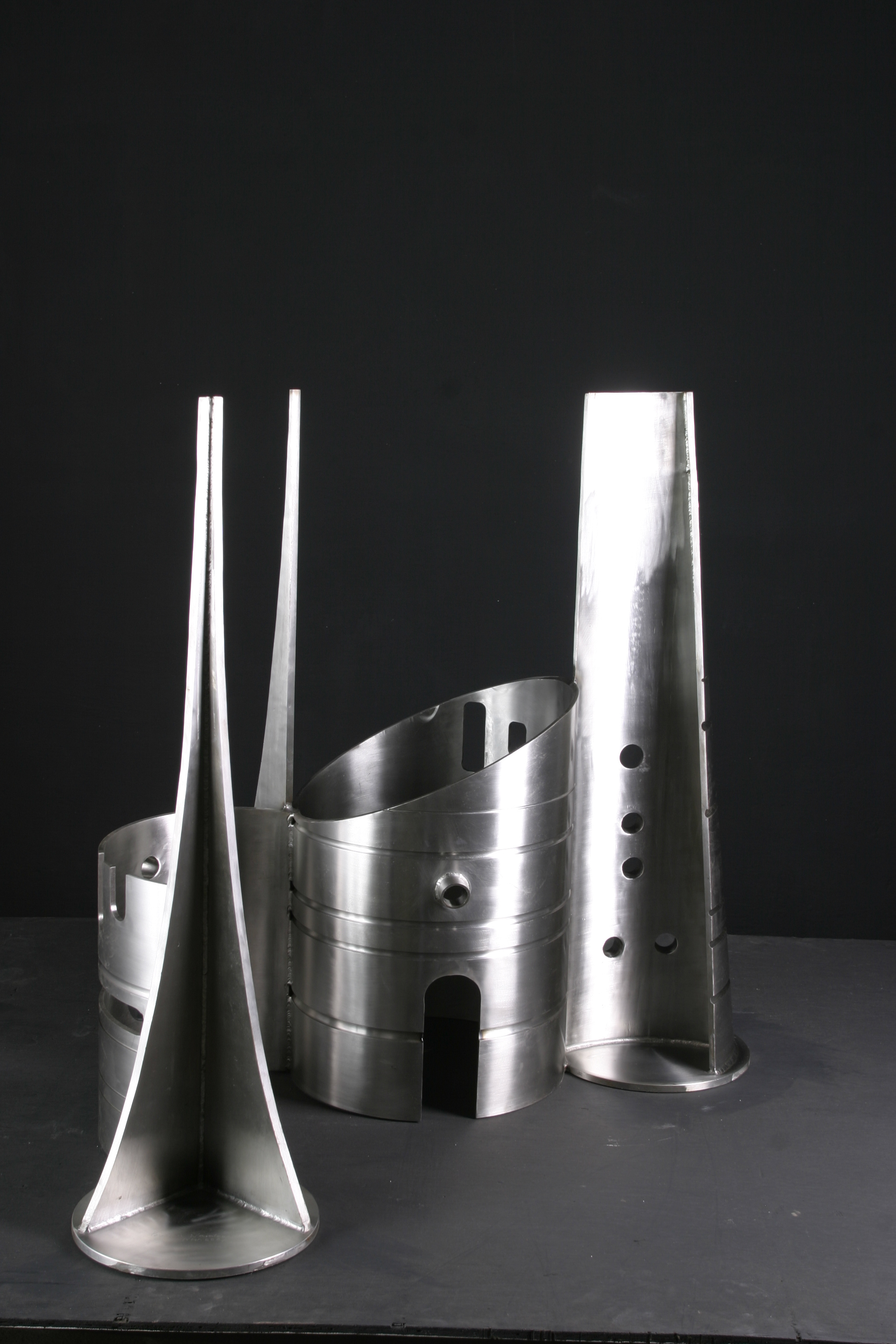
Poetry in architecture, 2004

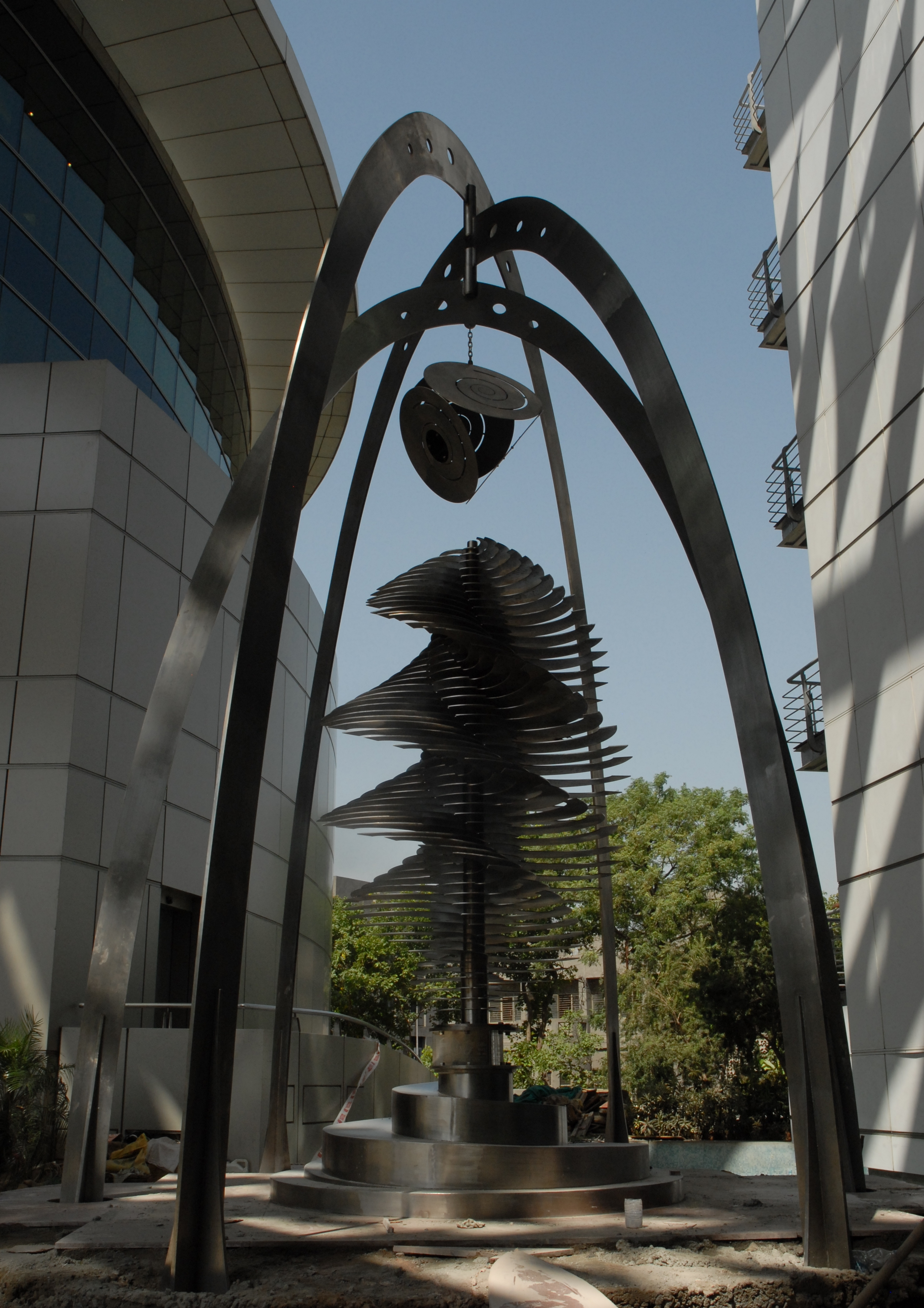
The Sky is the Limit, 2010

- Monument to the Assassinated, Kota stone, steel and granite, 2.5 x 5.6 x 1.8 m., Goethe-Institut Max Mueller Bhavan, New Delhi, 1995
- Valampiri Shankha, stainless steel, 2.4 m. high, Indian Institute of Science, gifted by Texas Instruments, Bangalore, 2000
- Hanging sculpture, stainless steel, 5.3 m. high, ING-Vysya Bank, Bangalore, 2003
- Sculpture for Timken, stainless steel, 6.02 m. high, TIMKEN, Bangalore, 2004
- Kannati Bimbam, 2007
- The Sky is the Limit, stainless steel, 6.5 m. high, Indian Oil Corporation, New Delhi, 2010

== Collections ==
- National Gallery of Modern Art, India (sculptures in National Gallery Modern Art, New Delhi; Government Museum, Bangalore; National Gallery of Modern Art, Bangalore; Jawahar Kala Kendra, Jaipur)
- Government Museum, Chennai
- Museum of Sacred Art, Durbuy, Belgium
- Jawaharlal Nehru Centre for Advanced Scientific Research, Bangalore
- Rietberg Museum, Zurich

See more in Shrishti Art Gallery, India.

== Publications on ritual art ==
- Nambiar, Balan (2014). "Veeralipattu, Valampiri Shankha, Kannadi Bimbam". Kottayam, Kerala State, India: DC Books. ISBN 978-81-264-5348-1 (Malayalam)
- Nambiar, Balan (2011). "Ancient Ritual Objects and Modern Sculptures: The Metal Mirrors and Valampiri Conches of Kerala". In Narasimha, Roddam (ed.). History of Science, Philosophy and Culture in Indian Civilization. Munshirm Manoharlal. pp. 407–422. ISBN 978-81-87586-494.
- Nambiar, Balan (2009). "Mythos und Kunsthandwerk (Rituals, myths and handicrafts)". In Beltz, Johannes. Wenn Masken tanzen – Rituelles Theater und Bronzekunst aus Südindien. Museum Rietberg, Zürich, pp. 19–55. ISBN 978-3-907077-40-5 (German)
- Nambiar, Balan (2001). "Masks in the ritual arts of the west coast of southern India". In Malik, S.C. Man, Mind and Mask, IGNCA, New Delhi, pp. 267–271. ISBN 81-7305-192-5
- Nambiar, Balan (2000). "Teyyam, the Ritual Performing Arts of northern Kerala". In Goswamy, B.N. History of Science, Philosophy and Culture in Indian Civilization: Indian Art, pp. 265–277, New Delhi. ISBN 81-215-0904-1
- Nambiar, Balan (1993). "Tai paradevata: Ritual impersonation in the Teyyam tradition of Kerala". In Brückner H., Lutze L., Malik A. Flags of fame, Studies in South Asian folk culture, pp. 139–163, South Asia Books, ISBN 81-7304-049-4
- Nambiar, Balan., Fisher E. (1987) "Patola / Virali pattu – from Gujarat to Kerala". Lang, Peter, Asiatische Studien 41,2: 120–146, 1987 (German)
- Nambiar, Balan (1981). "Gods and Ghosts – Teyyam and Bhuta rituals". Doshi, Saryu (ed) The performing Arts, Marg Volume 34, Issues 3–4, Bombay, 1981, pp 62–73
