= Berlin Kunjananthan Nair =

Indian activist and journalist

- Born: P. Kunjananthan Nair; 26 November 1926; Cherukunnu, Kannur, British India
- Died: 8 August 2022 (aged 95); Narath, Kannur
- Occupation: Journalist

P. Kunjananthan Nair, popularly known as Berlin Kunjananthan Nair (26 November 1926–8 August 2022) was an Indian Marxist thinker, communist activist and journalist from Kerala. Nair graduated in Marxism Leninism and political science in 1958 from the Party School in Soviet Union. He also attended the Party Congress of the Soviet Union in 1959.

== Biography ==
P. Kunjananthan Nair was born on 26 November 1926 to Ananthan Nair and Sreedevi at Cherukunnu Kolankada Puthiya in Taliparamba taluk in Kannur district. He entered politics through the Congress Party, but later became a member of the Communist Party. Nair was seventeen years old when he participated in the first party congress of the Communist Party held in Bombay in May 1943.

While still a school student, Nair was elected to the leadership of the Balasangham formed under the leadership of Krishna Pillai. He joined the Communist Party in 1942. Nair worked in the Central Committee office of the undivided Communist Party in Delhi from 1953 to 1958. When EMS became the Chief Minister of Kerala in 1957, Nair worked as his private secretary. Nair graduated from Russia in 1958 in Marxism-Leninism and Political Science. He attended the Congress of the Soviet Communist Party in 1959. He has also worked as the Secretary of the A.K.G. in 1961.

For thirty years from 1962 to 1992, Nair worked in Berlin, Germany, as the European correspondent for the Blitz weekly. He has also worked for communist newspapers including the left-leaning New Age, Navayugam, Navajeevan, Deshabhimani, and Janayugam. He returned to Kerala in 1992 from Berlin.

On 3 March 2005, Nair was expelled from the Marxist Party on charges of using the media to defame the Party. He was expelled from the primary membership of the party by the decision of the upper committee, despite the opposition of all members of the his local party branch committee. Nair was with V.S faction from 2002 to 2013, when factionalism was rife in the Marxist Party.

He described Pinarayi, who was then the Marxist Party Secretary, as the adopted son of capitalism. His book What Hidden Cameras Do Not Tell was highly critical of Pinarayi. His book, Polichezhuthu, which discussed issues within the party, was also controversial at the time. Some senior Marxist leaders at one point described Nair as someone who had no connection with the party. He died on 8 August 2022 due to age related issues.

== See also ==
- Marxism-Leninism
