= Kannapuram railway station =

Railway station in Kerala, India

Kannapuram
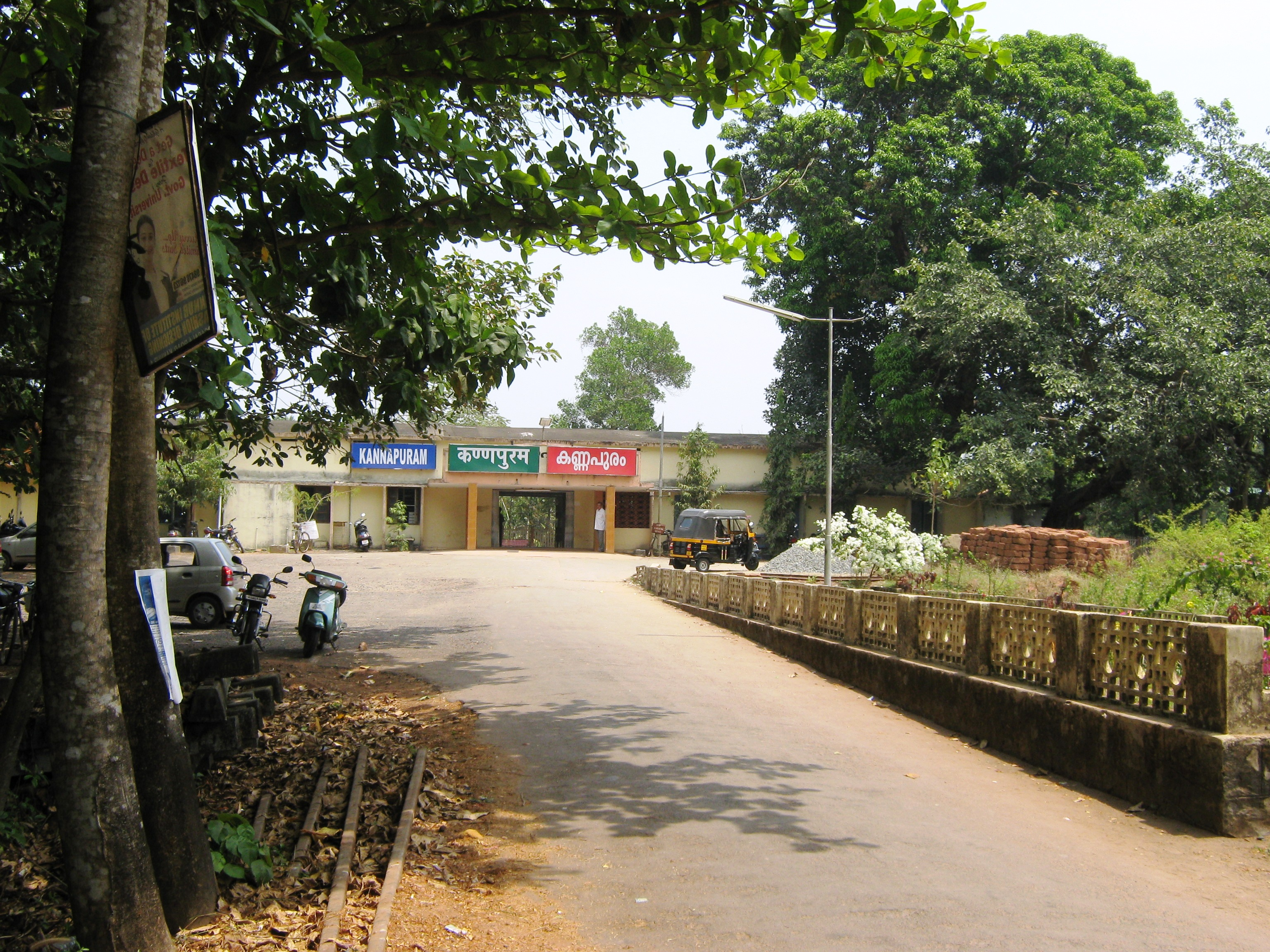
- Kannapuram railway station entrance

General information
- Location: Kannapuram, Kannur, Kerala, 670301; India
- Coordinates: 11.594°N 75.1849°E
- Elevation: 10 metres (33 ft)
- System: Regional rail and Light rail station
- Owner: Indian Railways
- Operator: Southern Railway zone
- Line: 2
- Platforms: 2
- Tracks: 3
- Connections: Shoranur–Mangalore section

Construction
- Structure type: Standard (on-ground station)
- Parking: Yes

Other information
- Status: Functioning
- Station code: KPQ
- Zone(s): Southern Railway zone
- Division(s): Palakkad

History
- Opened: 1907; 119 years ago
- Electrified: Double Electrified BG
Location
- Location within India Location within Kerala

Kannapuram railway station (station code: KPQ) is an NSG–5 category Indian railway station in Palakkad railway division of Southern Railway zone. It is situated in Kannapuram village of the Kannur district.

== Line and location ==
It is 15 kilometres (9.3 mi) away from Kannur railway station and lies in the Shoranur – Mangalore section of the Southern Railways. It is well connected to Kannur, Pazhayangadi, Cherukunnu, Pappinisseri, Payyannur and Taliparamba by road.

== Notable places nearby ==
- Parassini Muthappan Temple
- Vismaya Amusement Park
- Annapurneshwari Temple, Cherukunnu
- Government College of Engineering, Kannur
- National Institute of Fashion Technology, Kannur
- Vellikeel Eco Park
- Kannur University-Mangattuparamba Campus
- Parassinikkadavu Snake Park
- Kerala Armed Police IV Battalion
