= Waliullah (name) =

Waliullah, also spelled Waliyullah, Valiullah, Valiollah (Arabic: ولي الله) is used as a male Muslim name and often a by-name, meaning 'Custodian of God' or 'Friend of Allāh. Most prominently, this is an epithet of Ali ibn Abi Talib, the first Shia Imam and the fourth Rashidun Caliph. Frequent in the Persian influenced Islamic World; It may also refer to:

- Shah Waliullah Dehlawi (1703–1762), Indian Islamic scholar and reformer
- Valiollah Fallahi (1931–1981), Iranian general
- Valiollah Khakdan (1923–1996), Azerbaijani-Iranian art director
- Wali-ullah Abul-Mansur Khan, known as Ablai Khan (1711–1781), the ruler of the Kazakh Khanate
- Valiollah Seif (born 1952), Iranian banker
- Syed Waliullah (1922–1971), Bangladeshi novelist, short-story writer and playwright
- Valíyu'lláh Varqá (1884–1955), Iranian Bahá'í leader
- Mohammad Waliullah, Indian judge

== See also ==
- Muhammad al-Mahdi, the 12th Imam of Shia Muslims
- List of Arabic theophoric names
