= Cherukunnu =

- Census Town
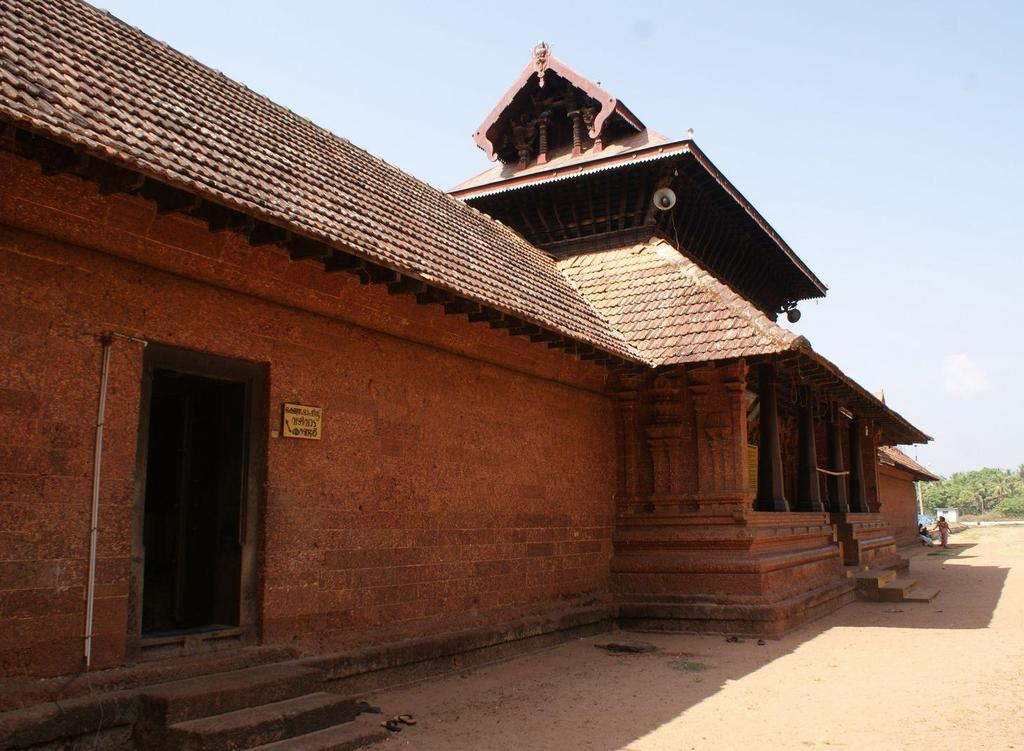
- Annapoorneshwari Temple, Cherukunnu

- Location in Kerala, India Cherukunnu (India)
- Coordinates: 12.0041°N 75.3004°E
- Country: India
- State: Kerala
- District: Kannur
- Taluk: Kannur

Government
  - Body: Panchayat (First Grade)

Area
  - Total: 15.37 km^{2} (5.93 sq mi)

Population (2011)
  - Total: 16,111
  - Density: 1,048/km^{2} (2,715/sq mi)

Languages
  - Official: Malayalam, English
- Time zone: UTC+5:30 (IST)
- PIN: 670301
- Telephone code: 0497
- ISO 3166 code: IN-KL
- Vehicle registration: KL-13
- Sex ratio: 1252 ♂/♀
- Literacy: 95.4%
- Lok Sabha constituency: Kasaragode
- Vidhan Sabha constituency: Kalliasseri
- Civic agency: Panchayat (First Grade)
- Climate: pleasant (Köppen)

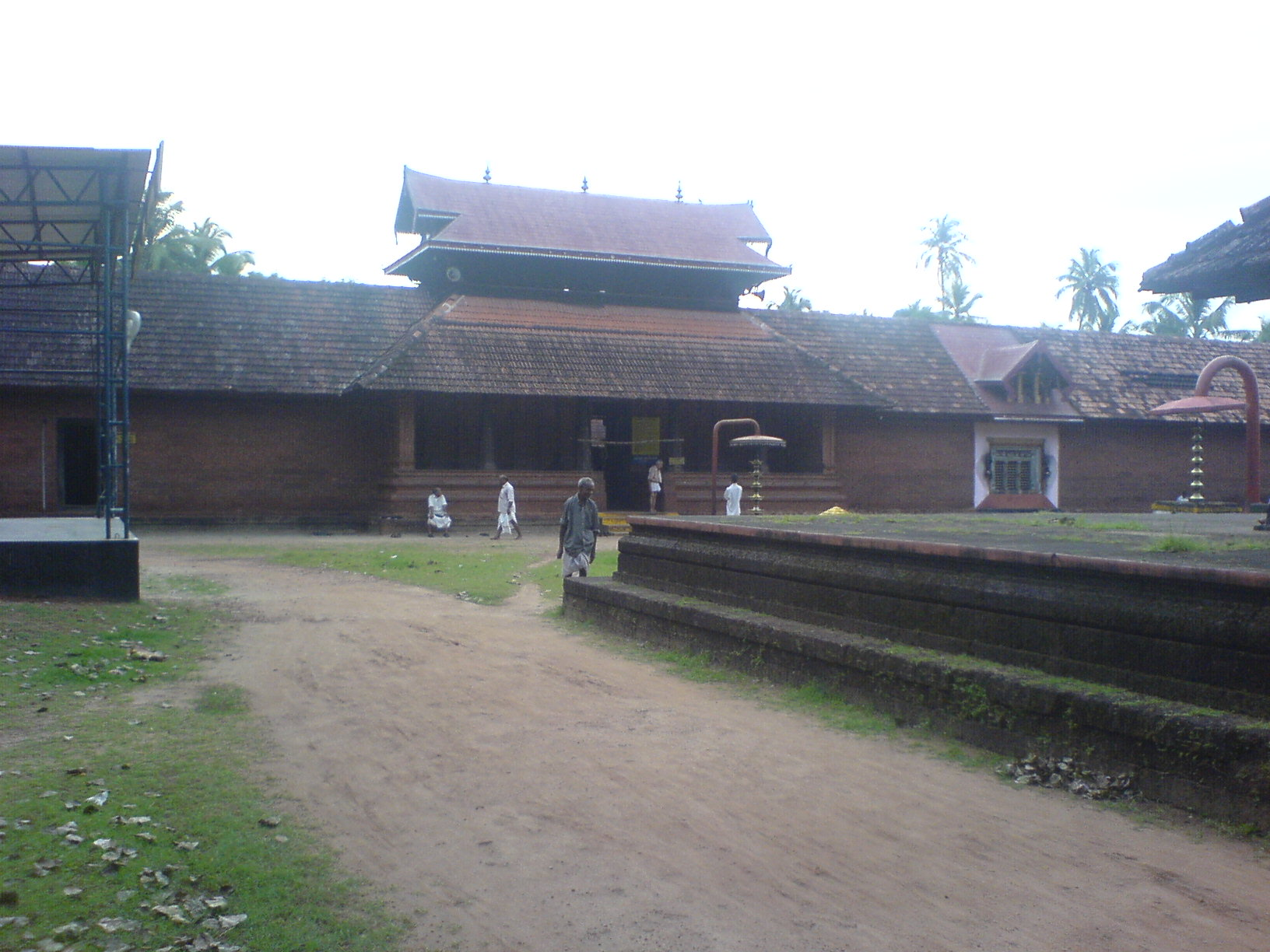
Annapoorneshwari Temple

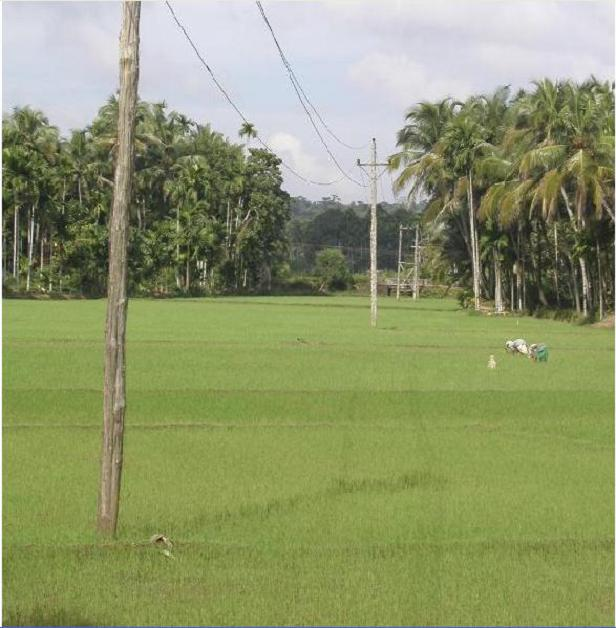
Paddy fields

Cherukunnu is a census town in Kannur district in the Indian state of Kerala. It is located on the Pappinisseri-Pilathara KSTP road, about 16 km (9.9 mi) northwest of the district headquarters Kannur and 6.5 km (4.0 mi) southeast of Pazhayangadi.

== Demographics ==
As of 2011 Census, Cherukunnu had a population of 16,111 which constitutes 7,153 (44.4%) males and 8,958 (55.6%) females. Cherukunnu census town spreads over an area of 15.33 km^{2} with 3,418 families residing in it. The sex ratio of Cherukunnu was 1,252, higher than the state average of 1,084. In Cherukunnu, 11.8% of the population is under 6 years of age. Cherukunnu had an overall literacy of 95.4%, higher than the state average of 94%. The male literacy stands at 97.8% and female literacy at 93.5%.

== Religions ==
As of 2011 census, Cherukunnu census town had total population of 16,111 among which 8,984 (55.8%) are Hindus, 5,648 (35%) are Muslims, 1,448 (9%) are Christians and 0.2% others.

== Culture and geography ==
Greater part of this village is surrounded by Backwater. The thuruths (small islands) of "Ayiram Thengau" and "Mungam" are places of interest nearby. This village shares borders with Kannapuram to the south, Madayi to the north, Mattool to the west, Ezhome and Pattuvam to the east.

Cherukunnu is famous for:

- Thavam Roman Catholic church;
- Oliyankara Juma Masjid;
- Annapoorneswari Temple;
- Mission Hospital.

=== Thavam Church ===
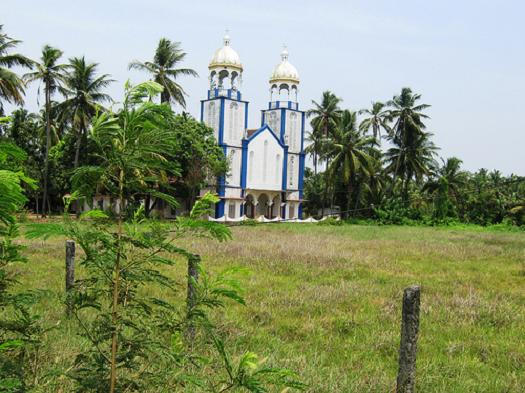
Thavam Church

The Thavam Church is a Roman Catholic Church in North Malabar. This church is very old, which proclaims the presence of Christians in North Malabar since ancient days. This is a heritage place for North Malabar Roman Catholic society. This church is under the Diocese of Kannur. This church is located at Thavam, between Cherukunnu and Pazhayangadi, around 17 km from Kannur, 19 km from Taliparamba and 15 km from Payyannur. Pazhayangadi is the nearest railway station. Other Roman Catholic churches in the Cherukunnu area include those at Kattakulam, Paadiyil Ferry, and Kavinisseri (Christhukunnu).

=== Oliyankara Juma Masjid ===
Oliyankara Juma Masjid (Valiyullahi), a Famous Dargah Shareef of Sahaba-e-Ikhram (Sufi Saints/Auliyas) is an important Mosque of North Malabar. It is believed that the priests in ancient days gave importance to the Hindu Gods at this Mosque. The Mosque is at Pallichal near Cherukunnu town, around 14 km from Kannur, 16 km from Taliparamba and 18 km from Payyannur. This is a location of a sufi grave, visited by people of all religions.

Kannapuram is the nearest rail head.

=== Annapoorneshwari Temple ===
At this Temple, Krishna is collocated with Sree Annapoorneswari. It is believed that Sree Annapoorneswari has visited this shrine which was under the sea. There is a mythological belief that this shrine was elevated by Parashurama. The temple is near Cherukunnu town, around 14 km from Kannur, 16 km from Taliparamba and 18 km from Payyannur. A large chira (swimming pool) also can be spotted near this temple.

In April every year, various religious and ritual and entertainment activities, including spectacle fireworks, are shown at this Temple to during the celebration of Vishu Villakulsavam.

Kannapuram is the nearest rail head.

=== Mission Hospital ===
Mission Hospital alias St. Martin de Porres Hospital Cherukunnu is a well-known hospital of this region. The hospital is equipped with modern medical facilities and also has a 24-hour Casualty and Trauma Care Centre. The Leprosy Department of this hospital provides free of cost treatment to Leprosy patients. This hospital is attached with a Nursing College viz. "Canossian College of Nursing" run by "Canossian Daughters of Charity" Convent Cherukunnu.

== Politics ==
After re-constituting; Cherukunnu is under Kalliasseri Assembly constituency which is part of Kasaragod Lok Sabha constituency. Earlier, this place was under Azhikode Assembly constituency of Kannur Lok Sabha constituency. As of 2026, the following persons represents this village on behalf of its people.

Cherukunnu Panchayat

| Panchayat president | Ms. MV Sheema | M.L.A. | Mr. M. Vijin | M.P. | Mr. Rajmohan Unnithan |

== Transportation ==
The National Highway 66 passes through Taliparamba town. Goa and Mumbai can be accessed on the northern side and Cochin and Thiruvananthapuram can be accessed on the southern side. Cherukunnu town is located on Valapattanam-Pappinisseri-Pazhayangadi main road which gets connected to the NH-66 through Pilathara at the north and Valapattanam bridge at the south.

The nearest railway stations are Kannapuram and Pazhayangadi, located 1 kilometre (0.62 mi) to the south and 7.5 kilometres (4.7 mi) to the north of Cherukunnu respectively. The nearest major railhead is Kannur, located 16.5 kilometres (10.3 mi) to the south on the Shoranur-Mangalore section of the Southern Railway zone. Trains are available to almost all parts of India subject to advance booking over the internet.

There are airports at Kannur, Mangalore and Calicut. All of them are international airports but direct flights are available only to Middle Eastern countries.

== Notable people ==
- Vijith Nambiar, film director
- Kanhangad Ramachandran, music director and singer
- Sreekala Sasidharan, film actress
- Berlin Kunjananthan Nair, journalist
