= Kalliasseri =

- Census Town
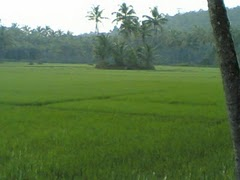
- Kalliasseri

- Location in Kerala, India Kalliasseri (India)
- Coordinates: 11.9712°N 75.3616°E
- Country: India
- State: Kerala
- District: Kannur

Government
  - Type: Panchayati raj (India)

Area
  - Total: 15.74 km^{2} (6.08 sq mi)

Population (2011)
  - Total: 31,122
  - Density: 1,977/km^{2} (5,121/sq mi)

Languages
  - Official: Malayalam, English
- Time zone: UTC+5:30 (IST)
- PIN: 670562
- Telephone code: 0497
- ISO 3166 code: IN-KL
- Vehicle registration: KL-13

Kalliasseri is a census town in Kannur district in the Indian state of Kerala. Kalliaseri Panchayat comprises two villages: Kalliasseri and Irinave.

== Demographics ==
As of 2011 Census, Kalliasseri had a population of 31,122, of which males constitute 14,111 (45.3%) of the population and 17,011 (54.7%) are females. Kalliasseri census town spreads over an area of 15.74 km^{2} (6.08 sq mi) with 7,149 families residing in it. The sex ratio of Kalliasseri was 1,205 higher than the state average of 1,084. In Kalliasseri, 10.2% of the population is under 6 years old. Kalliasseri had an overall literacy of 95.9%, higher than the state average of 94%. The male literacy rate stands at 98%, and female literacy rate was 94.2%.

Social composition in Kalliasseri (2011)
Community	Percent
Thiyyar	47.90%
Other Hindu	29.13%
Islam	23.48%
Christianity	1.08%

== Religions ==
As of 2011 census, Kalliasseri census town had total population of 31,122 among which 23,411 (75.2%) are Hindus, 7,307 (23.5%) are Muslims, 335 (1%) are Christians and 0.3% others.

== Geography ==
Kalliasseri is located at 11.95°N 75.35°E. It has an average elevation of 1 metre (3 feet).

Two major roads viz NH 17 and Kannur-Payyannur Highway goes through Kalliasseri. A major portion of Kalliasseri is surrounded by the Anthoor Municipality. Kalliasseri shares borders with Pappinisseri to the south-west, Kannapuram to the north and Anthoor to the East. Having an area of 15.37 km^{2}, 40% of Kalliasseri Panchayath is a part of middle land and 60% comes under Coastal Plain.

The highest point of Kalliasseri is Kalapram Motta, near the northern boundary of the panchayath. This point gives a view of the paddy fields and coconut groves of Kolath vayal. The Kandanchira Thodu, starting from chudala motta, near Kannur Engineering College, flows along from east to west of the panchayath, to which another stream which flows out from Kunhikulam and joins near Parakkadav. This streamlet reaches Irinav, where it is called Irinav puzha, and at its mouth a saline water regulator was constructed, connecting the islet of Madakkara. Recently, this was converted into a bridge. In the last century, Kolath vayal primarily planted paddy fields, but now it almost entirely consists of coconut plantations. Mauvadi Vayal Bird Watching Point is located in Kalliassery Village, where various types of migratory birds can be seen year-round.

== Administration ==
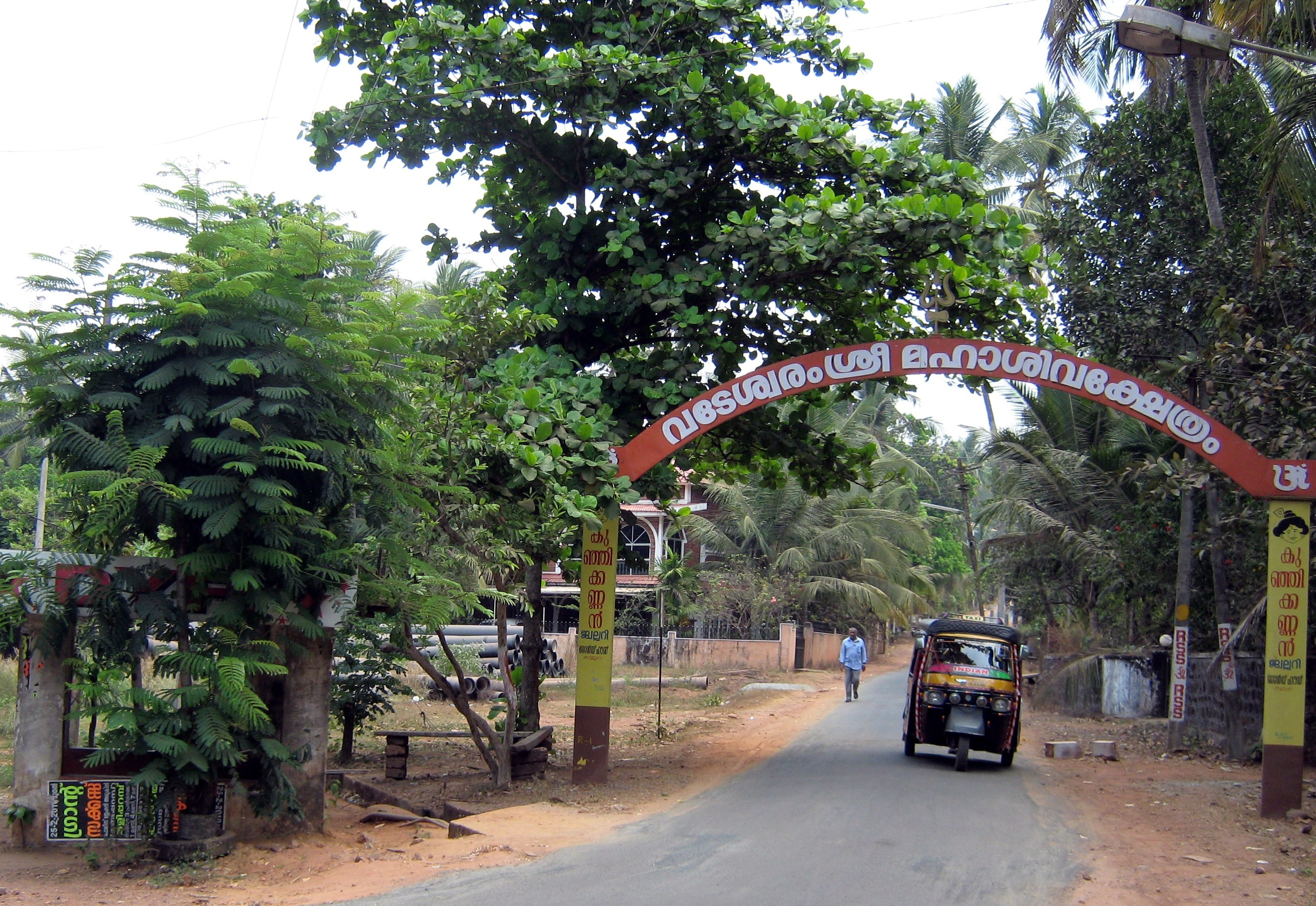
Keecheri Kunnu

- District: Kannur
- Taluk/Tehsil: Kannur
- Block: Kalliasseri
- Assembly Constituency: Kalliasseri
- Police Station: Kannapuram
- Post Office: 670562
- Telephone Exchange: Mangattuparambu (0497)
- Nearest Railway Station: Kannapuram.

== Culture and politics ==
Kalliasseri is notable for its contribution to the political space in Kerala, especially through E. K. Nayanar (former Chief Minister of Kerala) and K. P. R. Gopalan (freedom fighter who escaped the gallows following the intervention of Mahatma Gandhi (whose efforts proved successful in raising the issue inside the British Parliament which culminated in Queen Victoria reducing the death penalty to life imprisonment). Kalliassery also played a prominent role in the freedom movement of India, as well as the emergence of the Communist Party of India as a leading political movement in India. Kalliasseri was the centre of Karshaka Sangham of Chirakkal Taluk. Morazha incident, one of the famous events in the National Movement of Kerala in which a police sub inspector and a head constable was killed during the police intervention on the Anti-imperialist day public meeting on 15 September 1940, took place in Anchampeetika, on the northern border of Kalliasseri Panchayath. Sri.T.Damodaran Nambiar was the first President of Kalliasseri Grama Panchayat and K.V.Narayanan Nambiar. K.P.R.Rayarappan and M.P.Narayanan Nambiar were some of the notable leaders who became presidents of Kalliasseri GP.

During 1991–93, the Panchayat of Kalliassery was chosen for an experiment of Panchayath Level Participatory Planning in continuation with Panchayath Resource Mapping Programme, which was later known as "Kalliasseri Planning Model". A national seminar, "Learning From Kalliasseri" organised by Centre for Development Studies (CDS) Thiruvananthapuram in 1995, inaugurated by Sri A.K. Antony, Chief Minister of Kerala and validated by Sri E.M.S. Namboodipad, proclaimed the Kalliasseri planning model to be replicated. Later, this planning model became the role model for the "People's Planning Campaign" (PPC) of Kerala. Kalliasseri was the first Gram Panchayath in Kerala to establish a Panchayath Vikasana Samithi (PDS) based on Neighborhood Groups and a Panchayath level School Complex.

== Educational institutions ==
Kalliasseri has an average literacy rate of more than 90%. The Schools in this area often score well in state-level examinations including scholarship exams.

The important Educational Institutions in Kalliasseri are: EKNM Model Polytechnic College Kallyassery

- KPR Gopalan memorial Govt. Higher Secondary School
- Kendriya Vidyalaya, Mangattuparambu
- Odayammadam UP School
- Kalliassery South UP School (Vayalile School) Keechery
- Irinav UP School
- Irinav Muslim UP School
- Mangad L.P.School.
- Mangad East L.P. School
- Kalliassery Gov. LP School
- Kalliasseri Central LP School
- Irinav Hindu L.P. School
- Darul Iman L.P. School
- Kalliasseri Kannapuram L.P.School
- Model Polytechnic college, Kalliasseri
- AMSTEC co-operative Arts and Science College

== Notable people ==
- E. K. Nayanar, politician
- K. P. P. Nambiar, businessman
- K. P. R. Gopalan, politician

== Industries ==
K. P. P. Nambiar, a technocrat from Kalliasseri, was the first managing director of Keltron, which has some of its prominent industrial units in Mangattuparamba, Viz, Keltron Component Complex Limited (KCCL), Keltron Crystals Limited, Keltron Magnetics Limited and Keltron Capacitors Limited. Recently, a container complex was established by the GOI at Manatparamba.

The other major industries are:

- Handloom weaving and Garment making
- Wood-based industries
- Milk production and marketing
- Co-Op Banking

== Religious institutions ==
The major religious institutions within the Panchayat are Kandanthalli Sreekrishna Temple, Manakulangara Bhagavathi Temple, Mangad Pottan Theyya Sthanam, Chirakkutti Puthiya Kaavu (Vayalile Kottam), Kanhiramkunnu Poyyil Bhagawati temple, Elanchikkeel Temple, Mangad, Kappoth Kaav, Parakkadav, Vattakkil Muchilottu Kaav, Anchampeetika, Sree kurumba Kaav, Irinav, Ozhakroth Temple, Mangad Juma Masjid, Anchampeedika Juma Masjid, Hajimotta Masjid and Irinave Juma Masjid.

== Transportation ==
The national highway passes through Dharmashala junction. Mangalore and Mumbai can be accessed on the northern side. Cochin and Thiruvananthapuram can be accessed on the southern side. The road to the east connects to Mysore and Bangalore. The nearest railway stations are Kannapuram and Kannur on Mangalore-Palakkad line. There are airports at Mangalore Kannur and Calicut.
