= Dharmashala, Kannur =

Dharmashala
- Town
- EK Nayanar Memorial Govt. Woment and Children Hospital, Dharmashala

- Location in Kerala, India Dharmashala (India)
- Coordinates: 11.986°N 75.376°E
- Country: India
- State: Kerala
- District: Kannur
- Taluk: Taliparamba

Government
  - Body: Anthoor Municipality

Languages
  - Official: Malayalam, English
- Time zone: UTC+5:30 (IST)
- PIN: 670562
- Telephone code: 0497
- ISO 3166 code: IN-KL
- Vehicle registration: KL 59 /KL 13

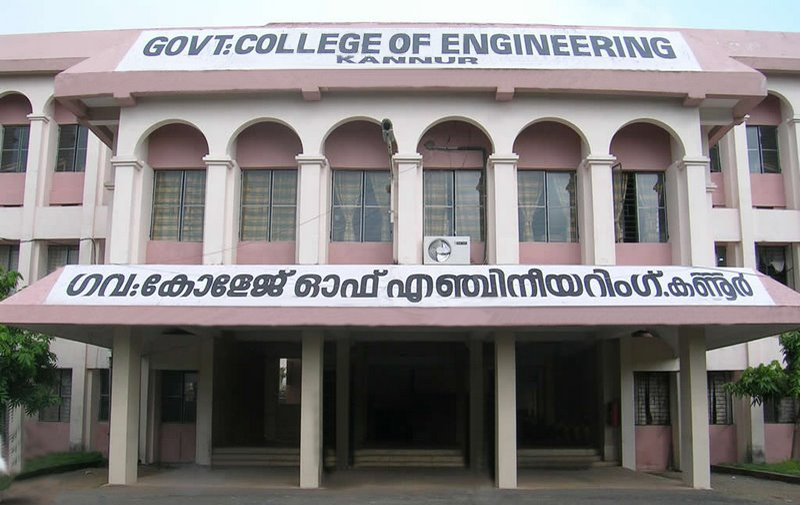
Government college of Engineering, Kannur located in Dharmasala.

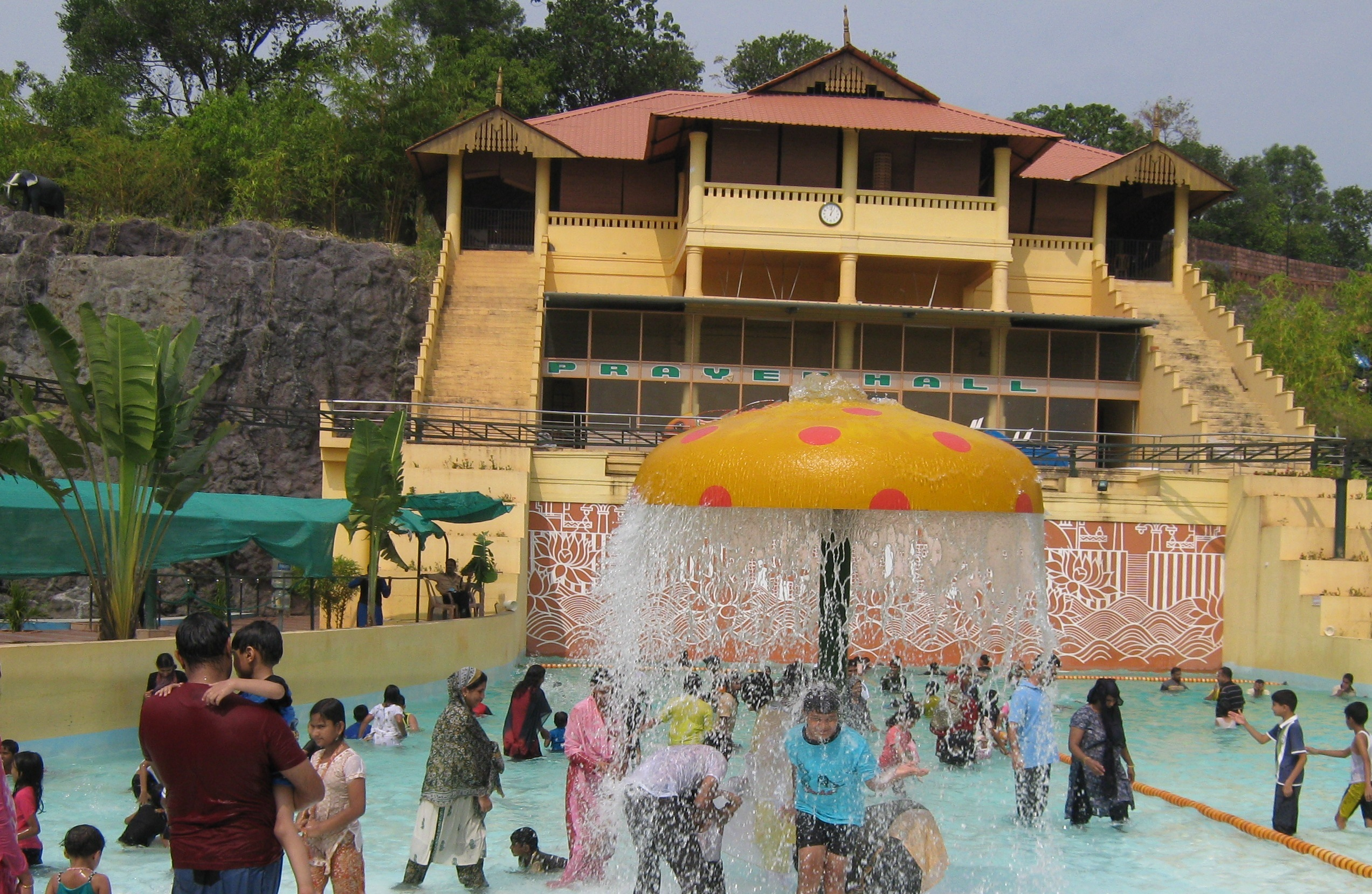
Vismaya Water Theme park

Dharmashala is a town and administrative headquarters of Anthoor Municipality in Kannur district, Kerala, India. It is located on National Highway 66 between Kannur and Taliparamba, approximately 16 km (9.9 mi) north of Kannur and 6 km (3.7 mi) south of Taliparamba. Dharmashala is home to several major institutions, including Kerala Armed Police 4th Battalion (KAP IV), the Kannur Rural Police Headquarters, Kannur University's Mangattuparamba campus, Government College of Engineering, Kannur and the National Institute of Fashion Technology Kannur.

== Education ==
- Kannur University
- Government College of Engineering, Kannur
- The thirteenth National Institute of Fashion Technology (NIFT) Campus in Kannur
