= Government College of Engineering, Kannur =

Indian public engineering institute

GCE Kannur
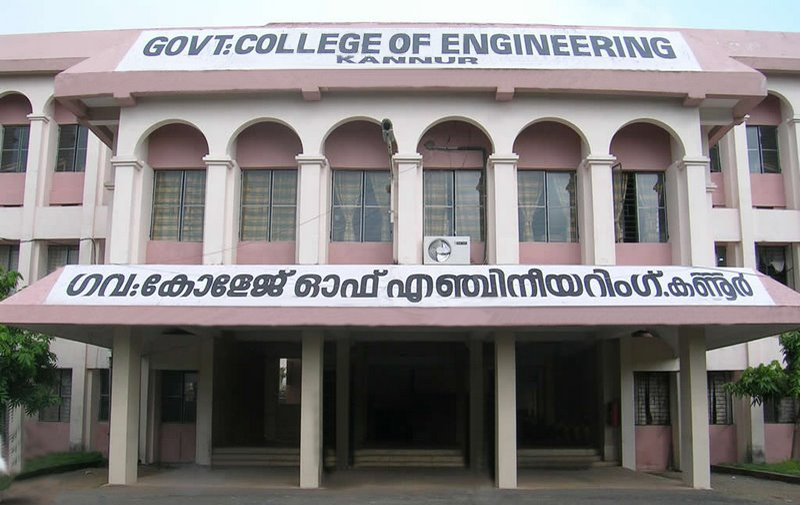
- Main building
- Other name: GCE-K
- Type: Public Engineering Institute
- Established: October 1986
- Affiliations: APJ Abdul Kalam Technological University (Since 2015); Kannur University (1996-2015); University of Calicut (1986-1996)
- Principal: Dr. Jayaprakash P
- Location: Kannur, Kerala, India; 11°59′9″N 75°22′55″E
- Campus: 75 acres (300,000 m^{2})
- Website: www.gcek.ac.in

The Government College of Engineering, Kannur (GCEK) is a public engineering institute affiliated to APJ Abdul Kalam Technological University in Kerala, India. The institute was established in October 1986 by Directorate of Technical Education under the Government of Kerala. In 2012, Careers360, a magazine promoted by Outlook Group, ranked it among the best engineering institutes in Kerala with AA+ rating.

GCEK has a 75-acre (300,000 m^{2}) campus in Dharmashala, located on National Highway 66, 16 km (9.9 mi) north of the district headquarters, Kannur, and 6 km (3.7 mi) south of Taliparamba.

The institute has an annual intake of 330 students (under five four-year graduate courses), on merit basis through the All Kerala Common Entrance Examination. The B.Tech. courses offered are mechanical engineering (60 seats), civil engineering (60 seats), electrical and electronics engineering (60 seats), electronics and communication engineering (90 seats) and computer science and engineering (60 seats).

M.Tech. courses in electrical and electronics engineering (power electronics and drives) and mechanical engineering (advanced manufacturing and mechanical systems) were started from 2011 to 2012 onward and electronics and communication engineering (signal processing and embedded systems) and civil engineering (computer-aided structural engineering) with an annual intake of 72 students.

== Courses ==
The institute was previously affiliated to Kannur University. Since 2015, the institute is affiliated to KTU.

The GCEK offers an M.Tech. degree in engineering in five subjects:

- Advanced manufacturing and mechanical systems design
- Power electronics and drives
- Signal processing and embedded systems
- Computer aided structural engineering
- Geotechnical and Geo-Environmental Energy

The institute offers B.Tech. Degree in Engineering in five subjects:

- Mechanical
- Civil
- Electrical and electronics
- Electronics and communication
- Computer science

The intake is 335 students per year.

The institute offers PhD.

== Departments ==
=== Engineering ===
- Mechanical Engineering
- Civil Engineering
- Electrical and Electronics Engineering
- Electronics and Communication Engineering
- Computer Science and Engineering

=== Non-engineering ===
- Department of Mathematics
- Department of Physics
- Department of Chemistry
- Department of Economics
- Department of Geology
- Department of Physical Education

== Facilities ==
The institute has seven buses for the conveyance of the staff and students, hostels for men and women, accommodating staff hostel and quarters, a co-operative store, a canteen and recreational facilities. GCEK has a training placement cell for campus recruitment and a Parent-Teacher Association.

Forums, clubs and associations include the Sports and Health club, NSS unit, Guidance and Counselling cell, Nature club, Cultural Center, Alumni association, science forum and IEEE Students Chapter.

Each department has computer labs and a library, besides the central computer lab and library. The institute website and 24-hour high-speed internet connection were inaugurated on 3 October 2002. The ECE department has an electronics fabrication laboratory consisting of laser cutters, 3d printers and accessories where students can do their projects.

== History ==
The foundation stone of the main building was laid by Sri. K. Karunakaran, Chief Minister of Kerala on 7 January 1987 at a function presided over by Sri. T.M. Jacob, Minister for Education. The first building constructed was the science block, inaugurated by Sri. Pacheni Kunhiraman.

The construction of the workshops and department blocks for engineering was completed in 1990. The complex was inaugurated by Sri. E.K. Nayanar (Chief Minister of Kerala) on 17 November 1990.

The main block was inaugurated on 1 June 1999 by Sri. P.J. Joseph, Minister for Education. All the classes were shifted to the new building. The new block has badminton courts and an open-air theatre.

=== Silver Jubilee ===
GCEK celebrates its 25th anniversary during the year 2011–12. Silver Jubilee celebrations started with Xplore 2011, a national-level technical and cultural festival. On 22 January 2012, Sri James Mathew MLA laid the foundation stone of Silver Jubilee Gate sponsored by the Alumni association and PTA and is expected to finish by March 2012. The closing ceremony of Silver Jubilee was held in March 2012.

== Notable alumni ==
- Byju Raveendran, Founder & CEO, Byju's The Learning App

== See also ==
- Government Engineering College, Trivandrum
- List of colleges in Kerala
- APJ Abdul Kalam Technological University
