= Kannapuram =

- Town
- Location in Kerala, India Kannapuram (India)
- Coordinates: 11.9691°N 75.3208°E
- Country: India
- State: Kerala
- District: Kannur
- Taluk: Kannur

Government
  - Type: Panchayati raj (India)
  - Body: Grama Panchayat (First Grade)

Area
  - Total: 14.39 km^{2} (5.56 sq mi)

Population (2011)
  - Total: 18,459
  - Density: 1,283/km^{2} (3,322/sq mi)

Languages
  - Official: Malayalam
- Time zone: UTC+5:30 (IST)
- PIN: 670301 & 670331
- Telephone code: 497286
- ISO 3166 code: IN-KL
- Vehicle registration: KL-13
- Nearest city: Kannur
- Literacy: 90.01%
- Lok Sabha constituency: Kasaragod
- Assembly constituency: Kalliasseri
- Climate: Tropical monsoon (Köppen)
- Avg. summer temperature: 35 °C (95 °F)
- Avg. winter temperature: 20 °C (68 °F)

Kannapuram is a census town and grama panchayat in Kannur district of North Malabar region in the Indian state of Kerala. It is located 15 km (9.3 mi) northwest of district headquarters Kannur and 7.5 km (4.7 mi) southeast of Pazhayangadi on the Pappinisseri-Pilathara KSTP road.

== Demographics ==
As of 2011 Census, Kannapuram had a population of 18,459 of which males constitute 8,220 (44.5%) of the population and 10,239 (55.5%) females. Kannapuram census town spreads over an area of 14.34 km^{2} (5.54 sq mi) with 4,531 families residing in it. The sex ratio of Kannapuram was 1,246 higher than state average of 1,084. In Kannapuram, 9.3% of the population is under 6 years of age. Kannapuram had an overall literacy of 95.5% higher than state average of 94%. The male literacy stands at 98.1% and female literacy was 93.4%.

== Religions ==
As of 2011 census, Kannapuram census town had total population of 18,459 among which 16,421 (89%) are Hindus, 1,448 (7.8%) are Muslims, 553 (3%) are Christians and 0.2% others.

== Geography ==
Kannapuram is a town located on Valapattanam-Pappinisseri-Pazhayangadi main road, situated near Cherukunnu in Kannur district of North Malabar region in the Indian state of Kerala. The village shares borders with Cherukunnu to the north, Kalliasseri to the south, Mattool to the west, Morazha village of Anthoor Municipality and Pattuvam to the east. Kannapuram was within the princely state of Kolathu Nadu under British control till independence. The name Kannapuram originated from the presence of Sri Krishna Temple (Thrikkoth). Kannan= Sri Krishnan. Puram= land (indicating place of Sri Krishnan). Another version is that Kannapuram is the Land of Saint Kannua, who meditated in a cave near Sri Krishna Temple, Thrikkoth.

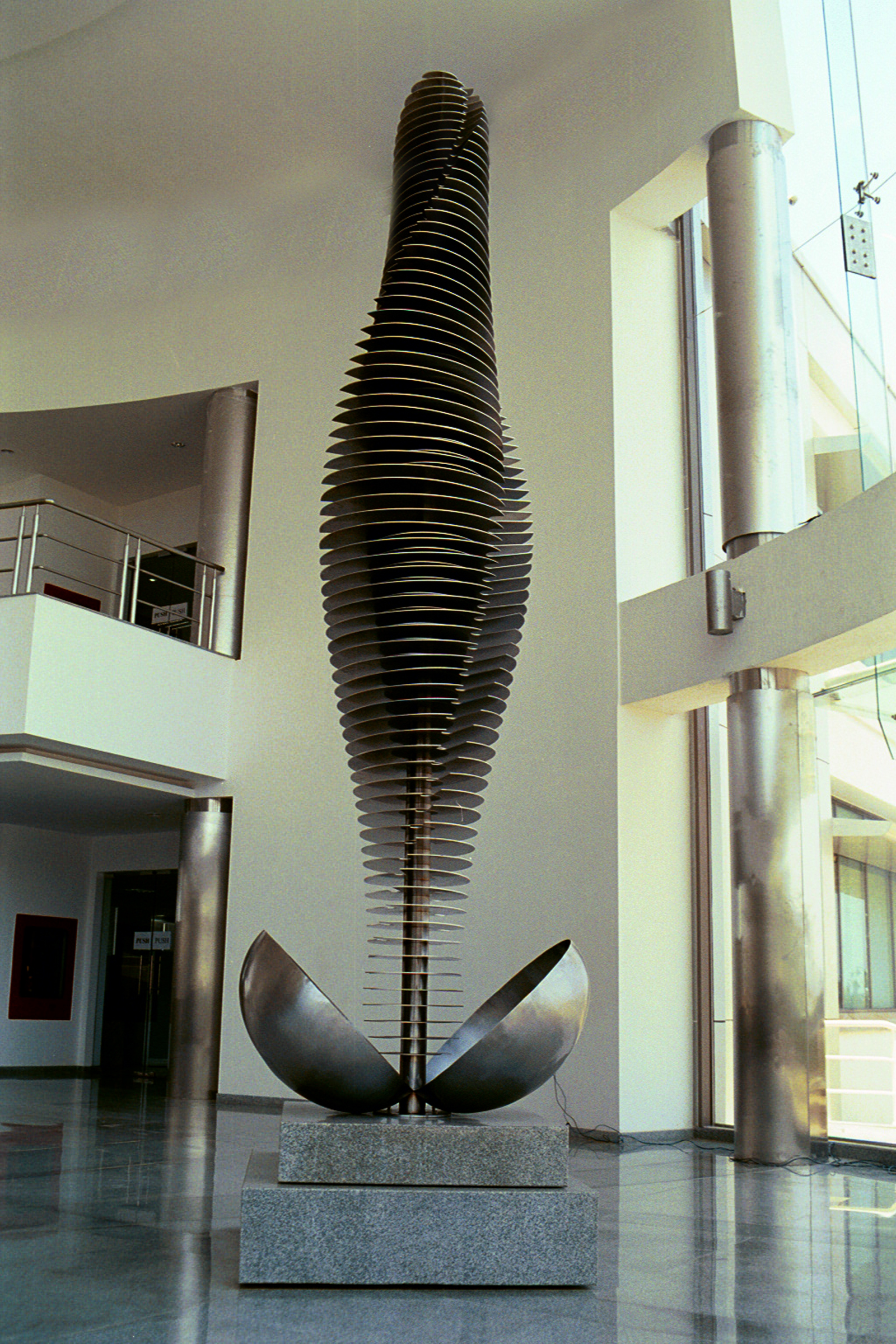
Sculptor Balan Nambiar's creation

=== China clay products ===
Kannapuram has deposits of China clay. Mottammal at Kannapuram has the China clay mining by the Govt of Kerala. However, there is no factory in Kannapuram for manufacturing any products out of China clay. The extracted soil (clay) is taken away as raw material for such manufacturing units located elsewhere, especially southern Kerala.

=== Sree Muchilot Bhagavathi Temple ===
Annual Muchilot Bhagavathi organizing in the Edakkepuram Sree Muchilot Temple at Kannapuram. Kaliyattam was celebrated from 29 December 2007 through 1 January 2008 and from 22 to 25 February 2008. Muchilot Bhagavathi is one of the most popular deities worshipped in North Kerala. Anustanangalum Samoohika Prasakthiyum'describes the importance of Muchilot Bhagavathi in the social formation of northern Kerala. There is a practice for supplying food to thousands of devotees in connection with the Muchilot Bhagavathi. Another work Muchilot Bhagavathi narrates the origin and establishment of Muchilot Kavu in different parts of Kannur and Kasaragod District. Highly decorative figure of Muchilot Bhagavathi attracts the minds of devotees and the men of esthetic sense. In Cherukunnu and Kannapuram Muchilot bhagavathi Theyyam is performed annually.

=== Karan Kavu ===
The view as well as the ambience is quite charming and devotional, with a positive vibe which attracts devotees. Thousands of devotees visits this temple during Theyyam. Karandaivam and Puthya Bagavathi are the main theyyam form performed here. Karandaivam indicates the "malsya avatharam" with the fish tail shaped "mudi" (crown). Puthyabagavathi haves a long mudi which is made up with bamboo. "Thenga earu" is another main attraction of Karankavu, where thousands of coconuts are thrown and broken on a particular stone inside the kaavu. Visitors from throughout Kerala come to Darankaavu and stay there during theyyam. And it is known as "bajana irikkal", where these people will concentrate on and worship their God on these days by staying in the temple itself. Theyyam, annadaanam, thenga earu, stalls, etc. are the main attractions of Darankaavu.

=== Randu Kara muthappan temple ===
A recently formed temple for muthappan. Other theyyams performed here are thondachan and thiruvappana.

=== Naniyil kaavu ===
At this temple, the main theyyams performed are Puthya bagavathi, thottummal bagavathy, vayanaatukulavan, Gulikan, etc. Theyyam starts on the second day when the theyyam of Karankaavu is over.

== Education ==
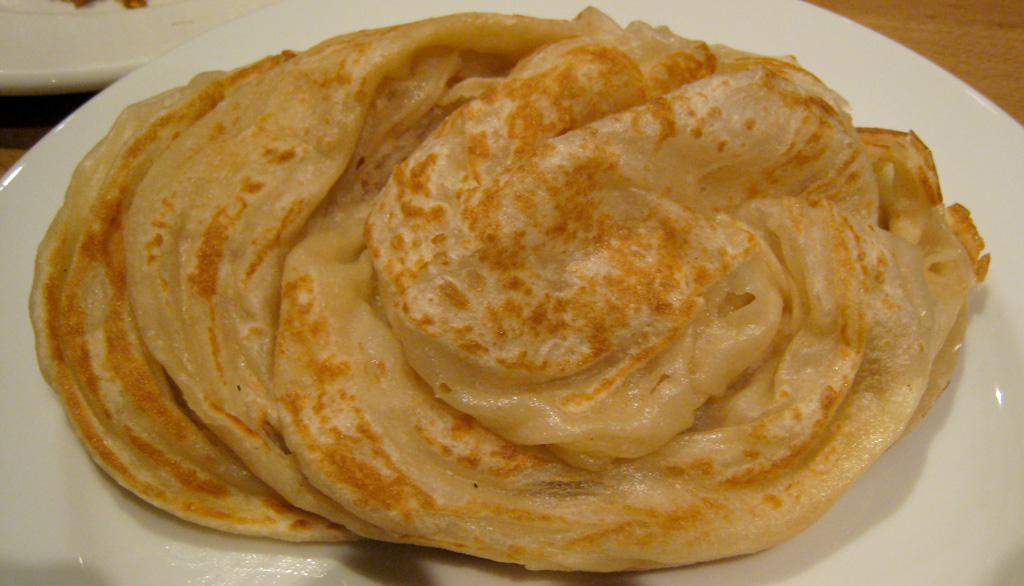
Kannapuram Parottas

Kannapuram has an average literacy rate of more than 90%. The schools of Cherukunnu include:

- Govt. Vocational Higher Secondary School
- Govt. Higher Secondary School
- Edakkeppuram UP School
- Edakkeppuram LP School
- Keezhara LP School
- Kannapuram East UP School, Mottammal
- Govt. LP School, Cherukunnu

== Arts ==
Kannapuram plays a vital role in nourishing the arts and culture of Kannur District as a whole.

== Major Industries ==
The major industries are:

- China clay
- Handloom
- Hand weave
- Milk production and marketing
- Co-Op Banking

== Transportation ==
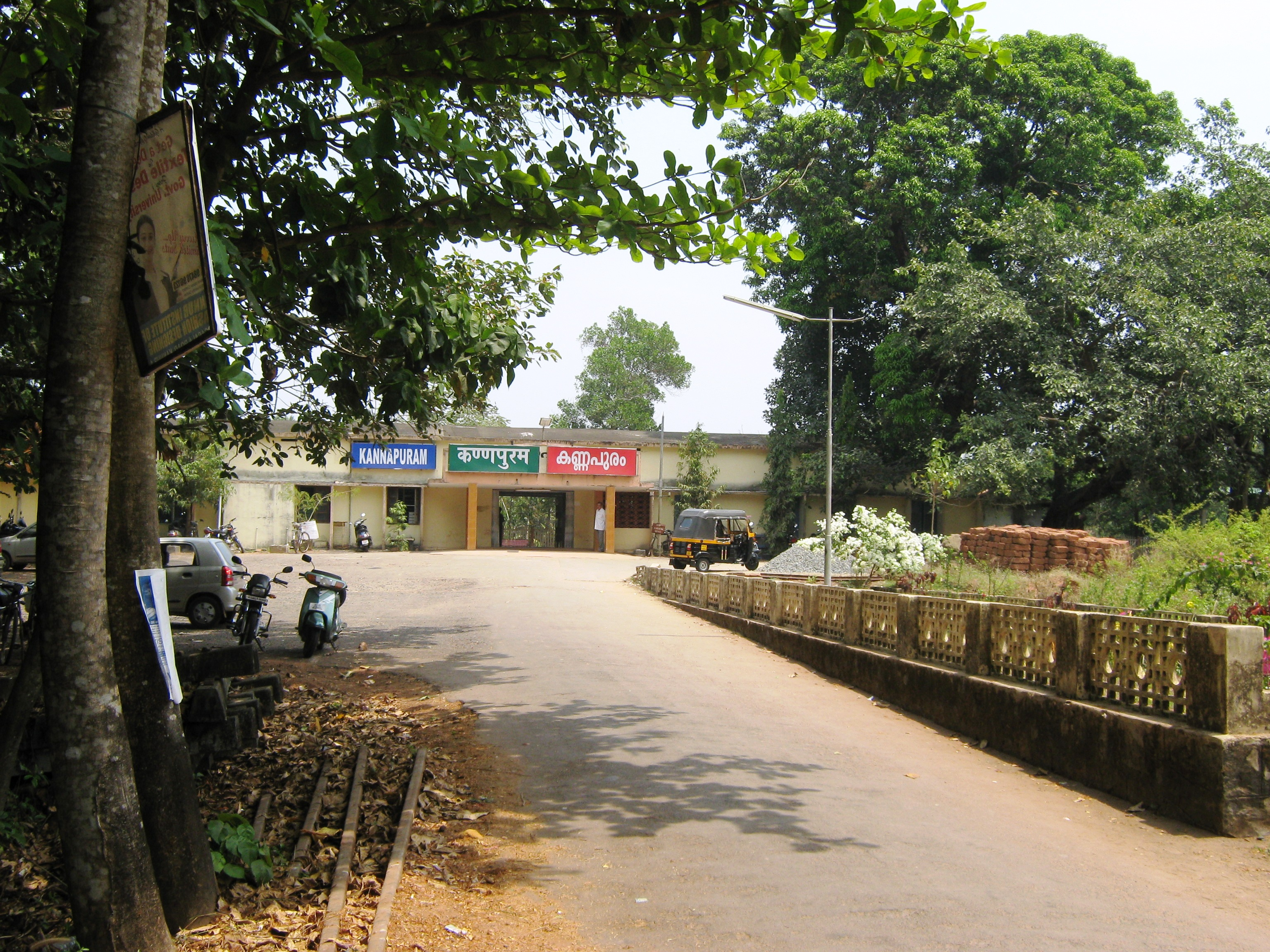
Kannapuram Railway Station

The National Highway 66 passes through the Taliparamba town. Mangalore, Goa and Mumbai can be accessed on the northern side and Kochi and Thiruvananthapuram can be accessed on the southern side. Kannapuram town is located on Valapattanam-Pappinisseri-Pazhayangadi main road which gets connected to the NH-66 through Pilathara at the north and Valapattanam bridge at the south.

The nearest railway station is Kannapuram on the Shoranur-Mangalore section of the Southern Railway zone. Trains are available to almost all parts of India subject to advance booking.

The nearest airport is Kannur, Mangalore and Calicut are also accessible. All are international airports with direct flights to the Middle East.

== Notable people ==
- Balan Nambiar, sculptor, painter
