= Eripuram =

Junction in Kannur district, Kerala, India

Coordinates: 12.0299°N 75.2676°E

Eripuram is a suburb and road junction in Pazhayangadi town in Kannur district, Kerala, India. It is part of Ezhome Grama Panchayat. The Government Taluk Hospital, Pazhayangadi is located at Eripuram. The four-way junction connects Payyanur and Pilathara towards the north, Pazhayangadi and Kannur towards south, Madayipara and Ezhimala towards west and Taliparamba and Ezhome towards the east.

== Location ==
Eripuram is located on the edge of the town Pazhayangadi between the cities of Payyanur and Kannur. Most of the village sits within the Ezhome census town area.

== History ==
In the old days Eripuram was the main link from Payangadi to Ezhome, Vengara, and other destinations.

== Etymology ==
The name Eripuram came from a Hindu mythology related to madayippara and vadukuntha siva temple. Lord Shiva got angry with Kamadevan and he burned Kamadevan in the fire from his third eye (thrikkanu). Later this place became known as Erriyicha Puram or Errinna Puram, and eventually Eripuram.

== Tourist attractions ==
Major attractions of Eripuram are Madayippara, Parakkaulam, Madayikkavu, Vadukunda Shiva temple and Vallikketu, a Kavu (sacred grove) containing a diversity of herbal plants and rare kinds of birds.

== Education ==
The town is the home of the Madayi Government Higher Secondary School for Girls and Boys, the Madayi co-operative bank, Taluk Hospital, the subregistrar's office, and a police station. Eripuram has a public library with a reference section.

== Transportation ==
The national highway passes through Taliparamba town. Goa and Mumbai can be accessed on the northern side and Cochin and Thiruvananthapuram can be accessed on the southern side. The road to the east of Iritty connects to Mysore and Bangalore. The nearest railway station is Pazhayangadi on Mangalore-Palakkad line. Trains are available to almost all parts of India subject to advance booking over the internet. There are airports at Mangalore and Calicut. Both of them are international airports but direct flights are available only to Middle Eastern countries.
