= Ezhome =

- Census Town
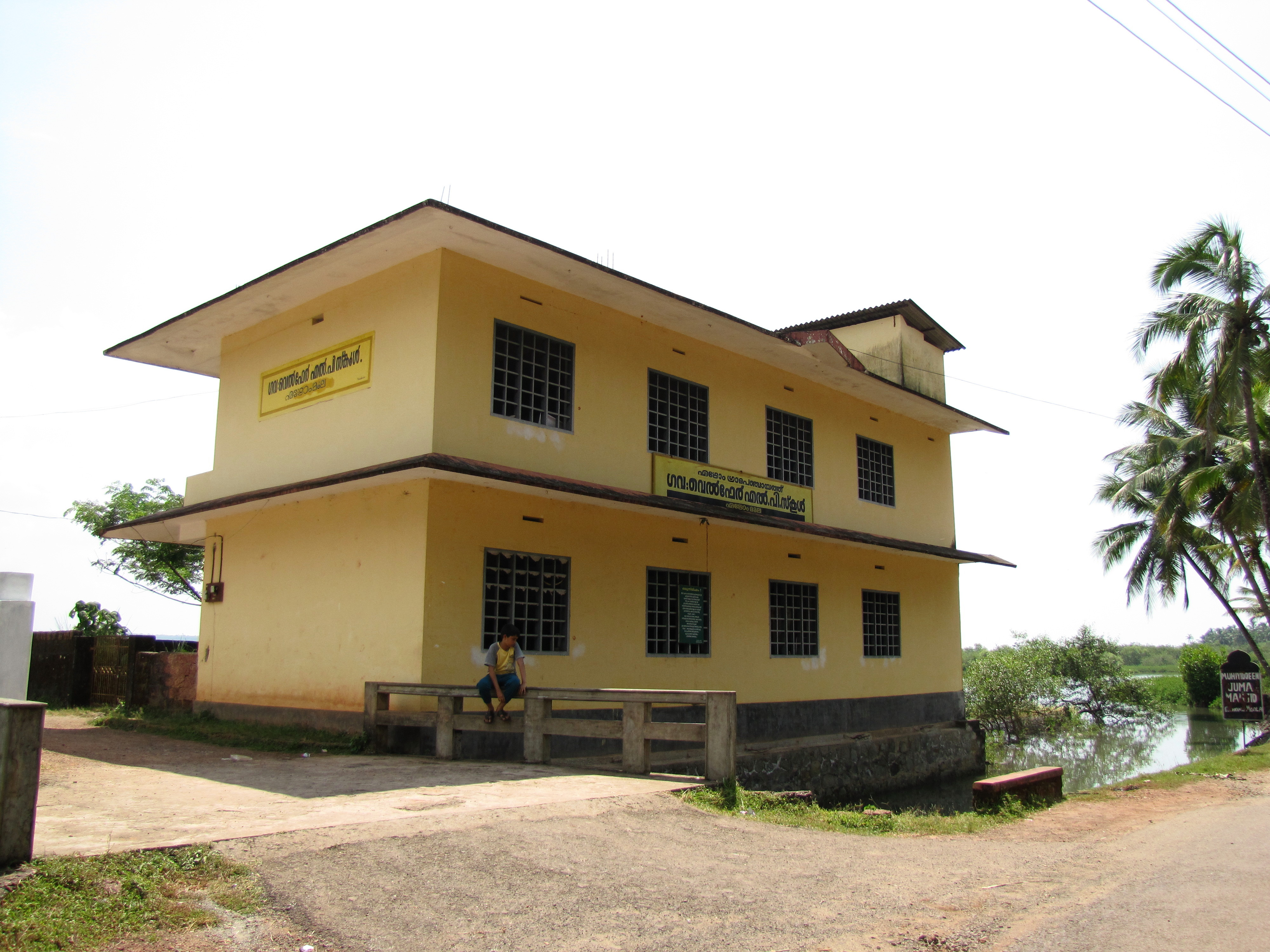
- School at Ezhome Moola

- Location in Kerala, India Ezhome (India)
- Coordinates: 12°2′0″N 75°17′0″E
- India: India
- State: Kerala
- District: Kannur

Government
  - Type: Panchayati raj (India)
  - Body: Ezhome Grama Panchayat

Area
  - Total: 18.9 km^{2} (7.3 sq mi)

Population (2011)
  - Total: 19,261
  - Density: 1,020/km^{2} (2,640/sq mi)

Languages
  - Official: Malayalam, English
- Time zone: UTC+05:30 (IST)
- PIN: 670334
- ISO 3166 code: IN-KL
- Vehicle registration: KL-86
- Nearest city: Pazhayangadi, Taliparamba, Payyanur, Kannur
- Vidhan Sabha constituency: Payyanur

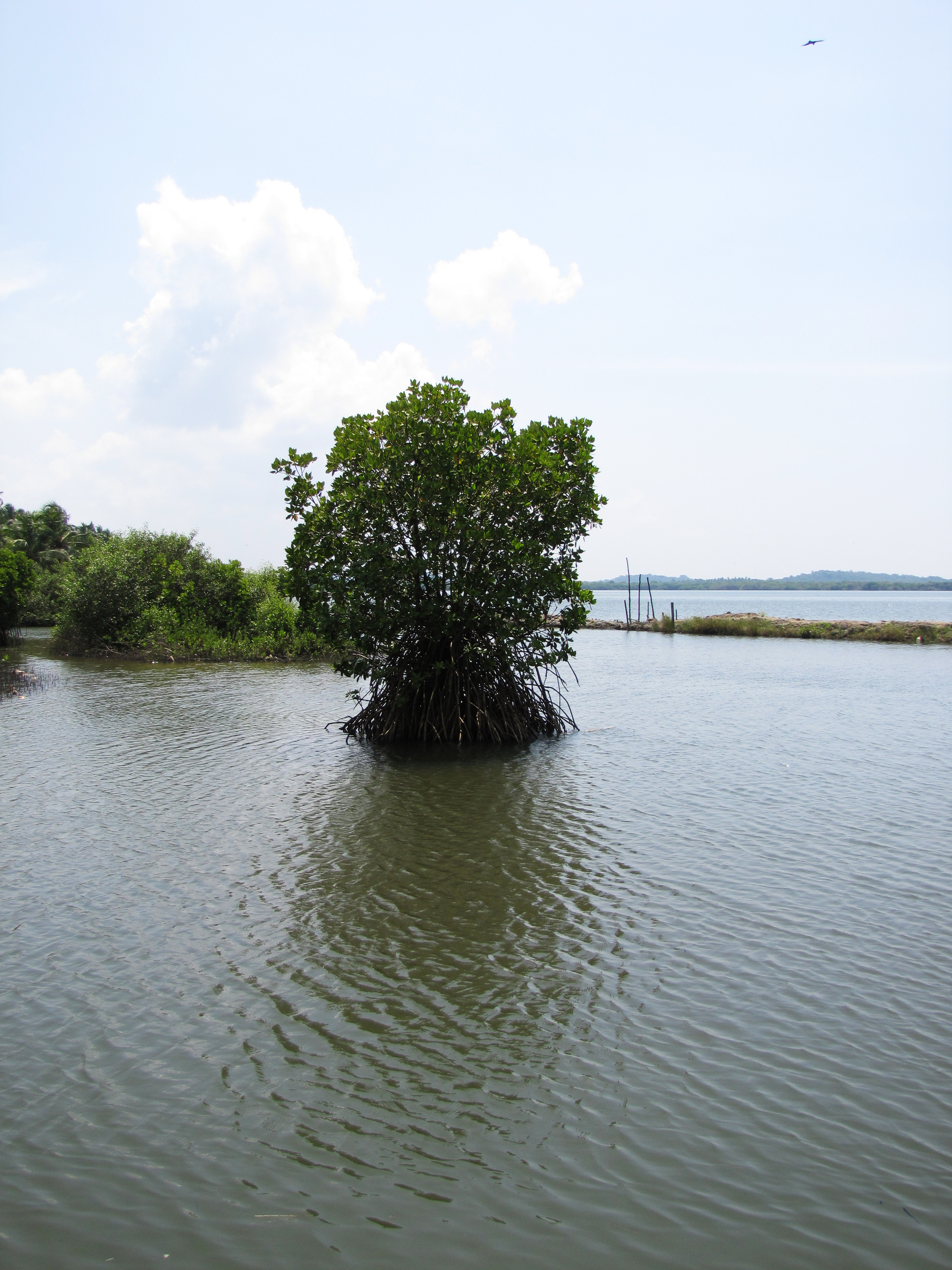
Mangroves in Ezhome

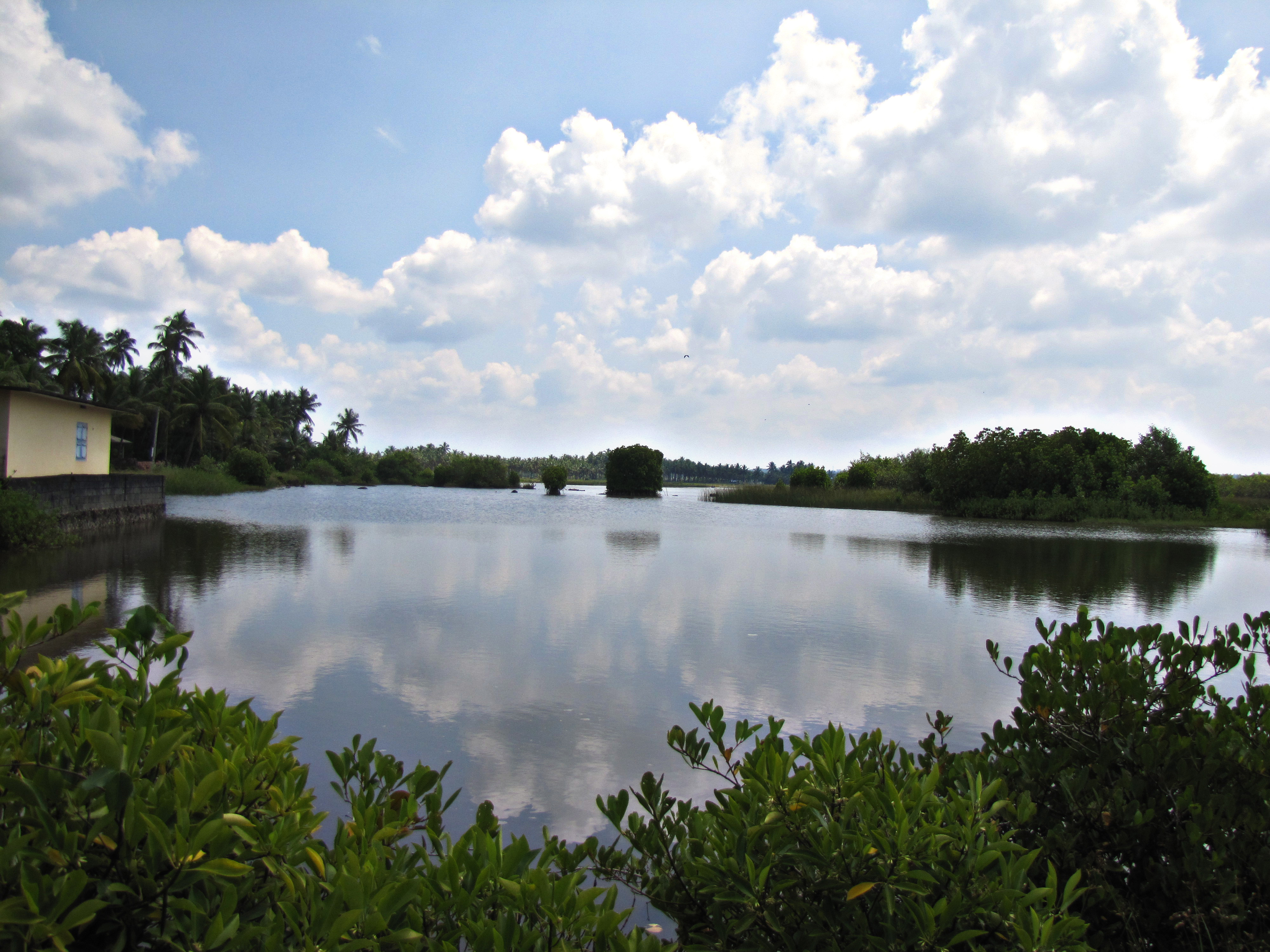
Ezhome Moola

Ezhome is a census town in Kannur district in the Indian state of Kerala.

== Demographics ==
As of 2011 Census, Ezhome had a population of 19,261 which constitutes 8,716 (45.25%) males and 10,545 (54.75%) females. Ezhome census town spreads over an area of 18.9 km^{2} (7.3 sq mi) with 4,297 families residing in it. The male female sex ratio was 1,216 higher than state average of 1,084. In Ezhome, 11.2% population falls under 6 years age. Ezhome had overall literacy of 95.3% higher than state average of 94%. The male literacy stands at 98% and female literacy was 93.2%.

== Religion ==
As of 2011 Indian census, Ezhome census town had total population of 19,261 which constitutes 63.2% Hindus, 32.4% Muslims, 4% Christians and 0.4% others.

== Background ==
Pazhayangadi is the nearest railway station (2 km). The nearest airports are Kannur International Airport (CNN) which is 45 km south of Ezhome and Mangalore International Airport (IXE) which is 120 km north of Ezhome. On its western edge and mostly within the census town area is the village of Eripuram.

Colleges include Madayi Cooperative Arts & Science College, Pariyaram Medical College, IHRD College Neruvampram, Payyanur College, Sir Syed College, Taliparamba, and Government College of Engineering, Kannur.

== New Rice Varieties ==
Ezhome Rice varieties ‘Ezhome-1’ and ‘Ezhome-2’ are the first high yielding, non-lodging red rice varieties. They are designed for the saline-prone Kaipad rice fields of Kerala. They yield awn-less, non-shattering grains, and favourable cooking qualities, better than local cultivars. The average yields of ‘Ezhome-1’ and ‘Ezhome-2’ are 3.5 tones/ha and 3.2 tones/ha respectively under close-planted and no-management conditions of Kaipad. This yield is 70% and 60% more than that of local cultivars. These varieties differ in duration, have distinct morphological and qualitative traits, and have different salinity tolerance mechanisms, imparting varietal diversity to the unique ecosystem of Kaipad.

These new seed varieties have been developed by the Kerala Agricultural University with the participation of farmers of Ezhome panchayat. This is the first venture of Kerala Agricultural University in development of a variety i) adopting the combined strategy of Global Breeding (traditional), and Participatory Plant Breeding, and ii) carrying out all stages of variety development directly in the problem area of farmers.

== Uthraam Masjidh, Ettammel ==
Utharam Masjid, also known as Utharam Palli, is a famous mosque situated at Ettammel, an attractive place in Puthiyangadi of Kannur District. It is managed by the Puthiyangadi Muslim Jamath committee. This mosque was built hundreds of years ago, and it was reconstructed about 60 years ago. This mosque is situated in Puthiyangadi "ettammel" near the Jamaath high school.

== Transportation ==
The national highway passes through Taliparamba town. Goa and Mumbai can be accessed on the northern side and Kochi and Thiruvananthapuram can be accessed on the southern side. The road to the east of Iritty connects to Mysore and Bangalore. The nearest railway station is Pazhayangadi on Mangalore-Palakkad line. Trains are available to almost all parts of India subject to advance booking over the internet. There are airports at Mangalore and Kannur. Both of them are international airports but direct flights are available only to Middle Eastern countries.

== Villages ==
- Aduthila
