= Matool =

Mattool
- village
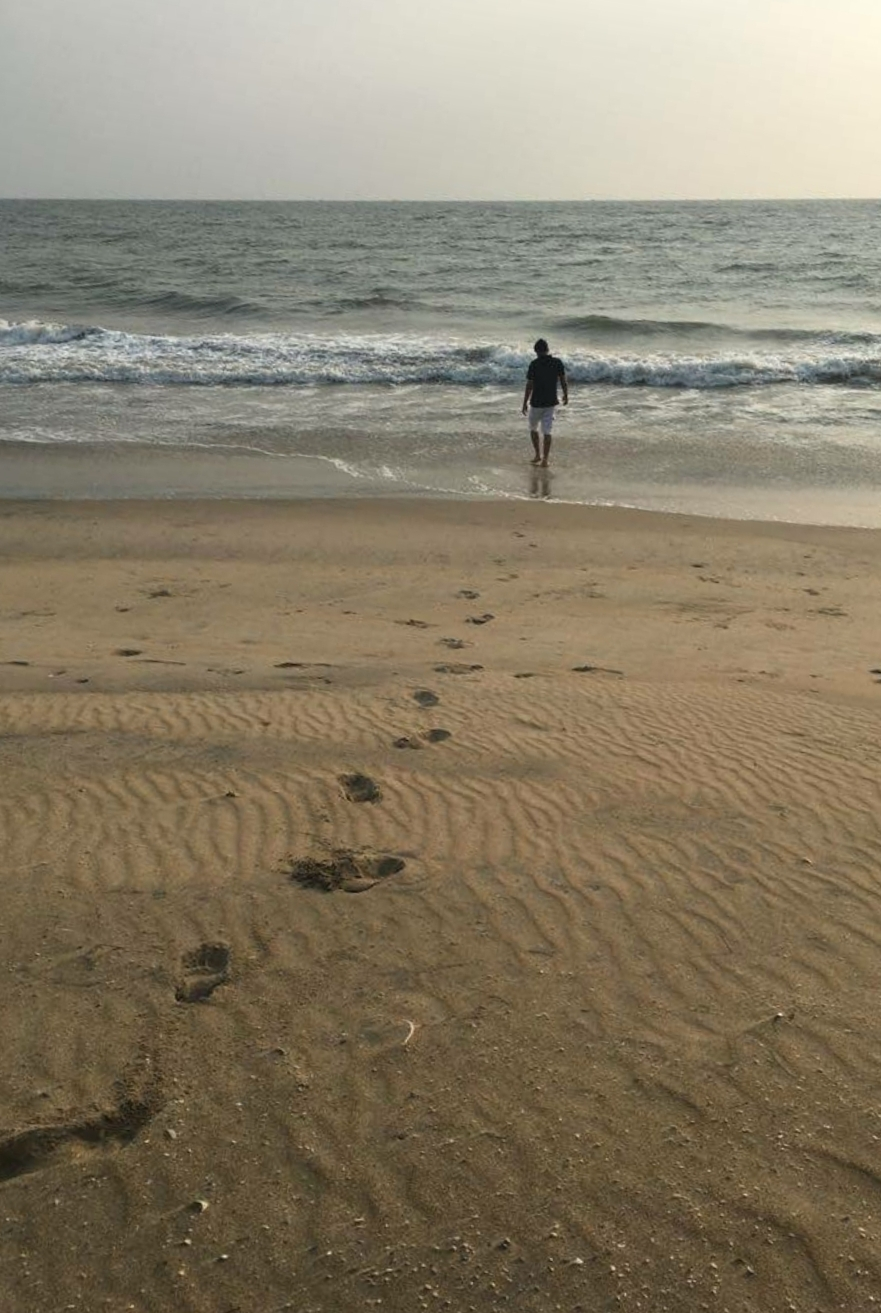
- Mattool Beach
- Interactive map of Mattool
- Coordinates: 11.957955°N 75.294159°E
- Country: India
- State: Kerala
- District: Kannur

Area
  - Total: 12.84 km^{2} (4.96 sq mi)

Population (2011)
  - Total: 27,806
  - Density: 2,166/km^{2} (5,609/sq mi)

Languages
  - Official: Malayalam, English
- Time zone: UTC+5:30 (IST)
- PIN: 670302(South), 670325(North)
- ISO 3166 code: IN-KL
- Vehicle registration: KL-13
- Website: https://mattool.in

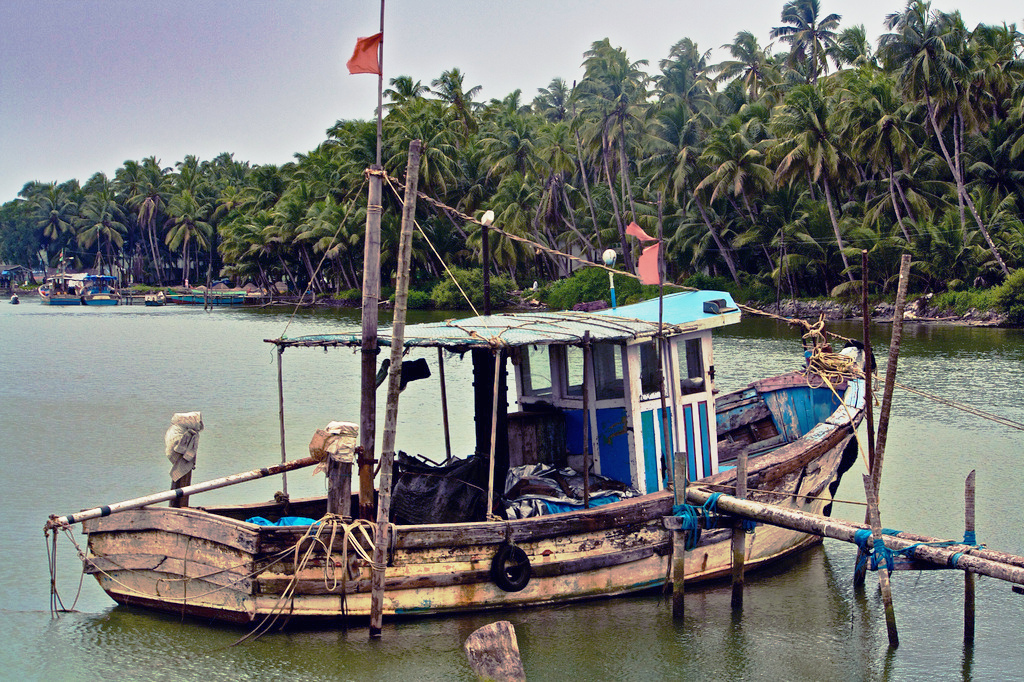
Ferry to Kannur

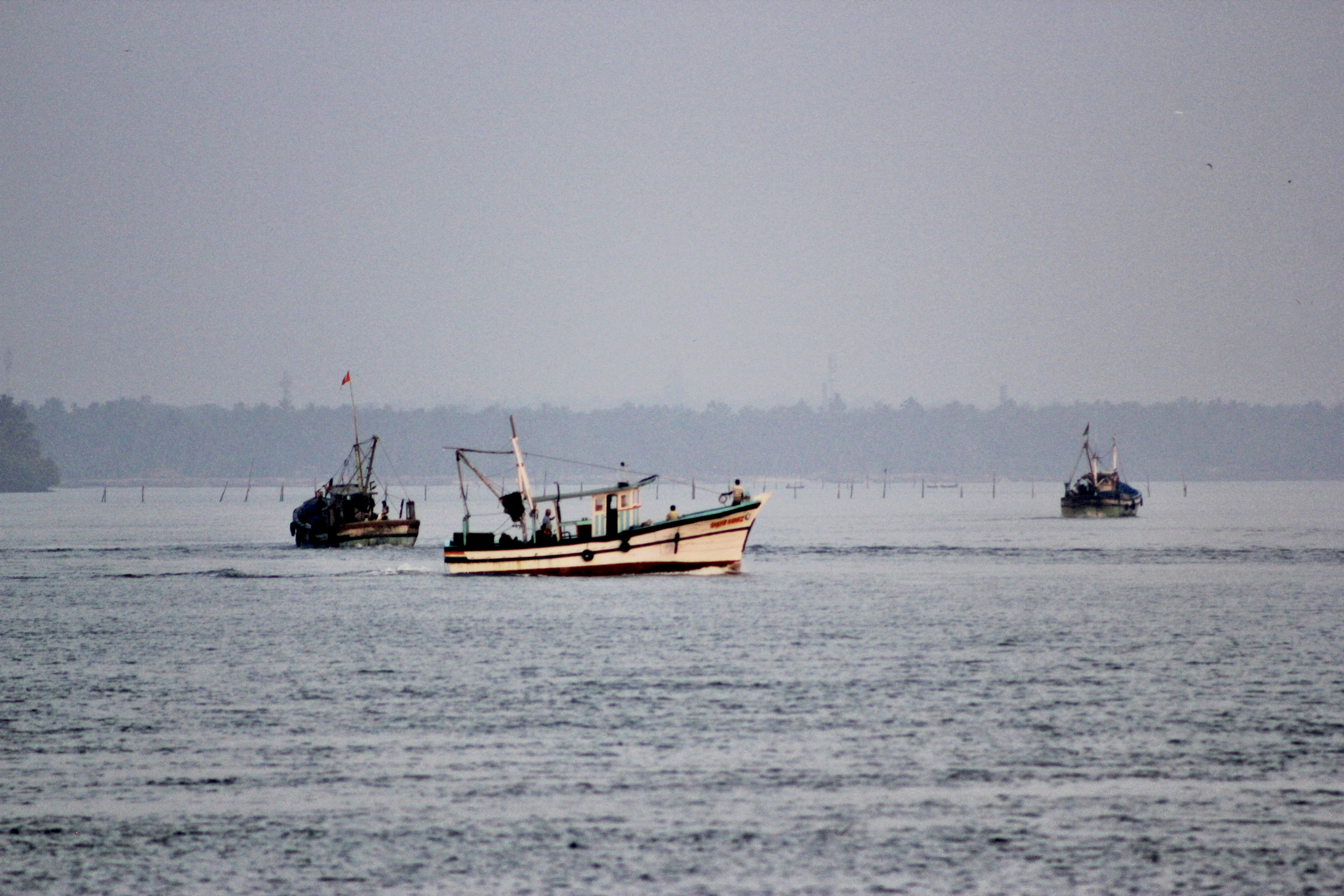
Fishing boats from Azheekkal, Mattool

Matool (also Mattul) is a village in Kannur Municipal Corporation of Kerala, India. It is located 19 kilometres (12 mi) north of Kannur city. The Valapattanam River and Kuppam River meet the Arabian Sea at Mattool. Mattool can be accessed from Kannur via Azheekal, using the Mattool–Azheekal ferry, or through the Madakkara–Mattool Bridge from Irinavu Road.

Matool is considered a boating destination with boat services to various coastal areas of Kannur district.

== Demographics ==
As of 2011 India census, Mattool had a population of 27,806 with 12,464 (44.8%) males and 15,342 (55.2%) females. Mattool has an area of 12.84 km^{2} with 4,564 families residing in it. The average sex ratio was 1231 higher than the state average of 1084. In Mattool, 14.7% of the population was under 6 years of age. Mattool had an average literacy of 95% higher than state average of 94%.

== Transportation ==
The national highway passes through Taliparamba town. Goa and Mumbai can be accessed on the northern side and Cochin and Thiruvananthapuram can be accessed on the southern side. The road to the east of Iritty connects to Mysore and Bangalore. The nearest railway station is Pazhayangadi on Mangalore-Palakkad line. Trains are available to almost all parts of India subject to advance booking over the internet. There are airports at Kannur, Mangalore and Calicut. All of them are international airports but direct flights are available only to Middle Eastern countries.

== See also ==
- Ezhimala Hill
- Kannur
- Madayi
- Pazhayangadi
- Madayipara
