= Aduthila =

- Village
- Interactive map of Aduthila
- Coordinates: 12.04285°N 75.26416°E
- Country: India
- State: Kerala
- District: Kannur

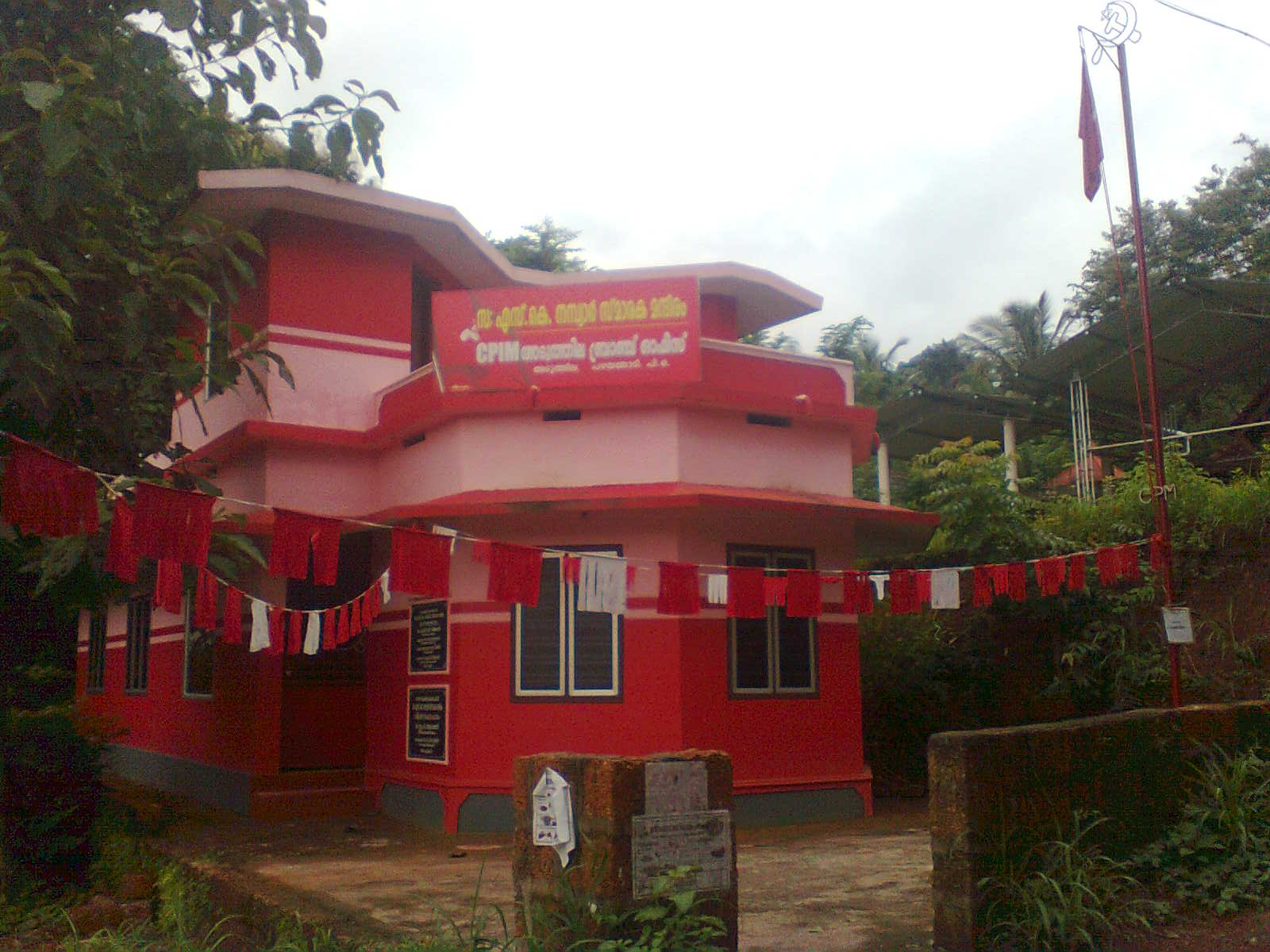
S.K.Nambiar Memorial

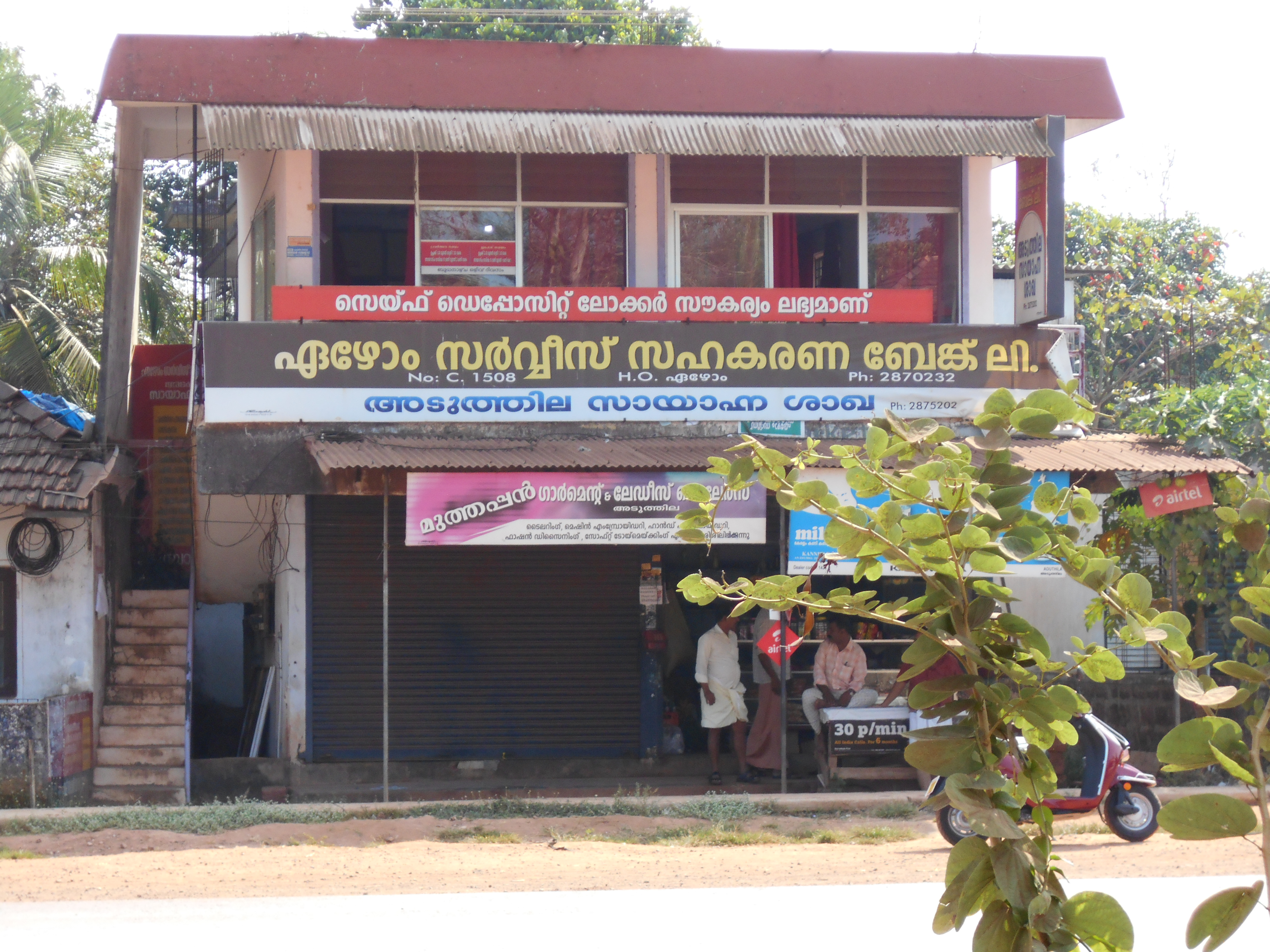
Ezhom Service Cooperative Bank

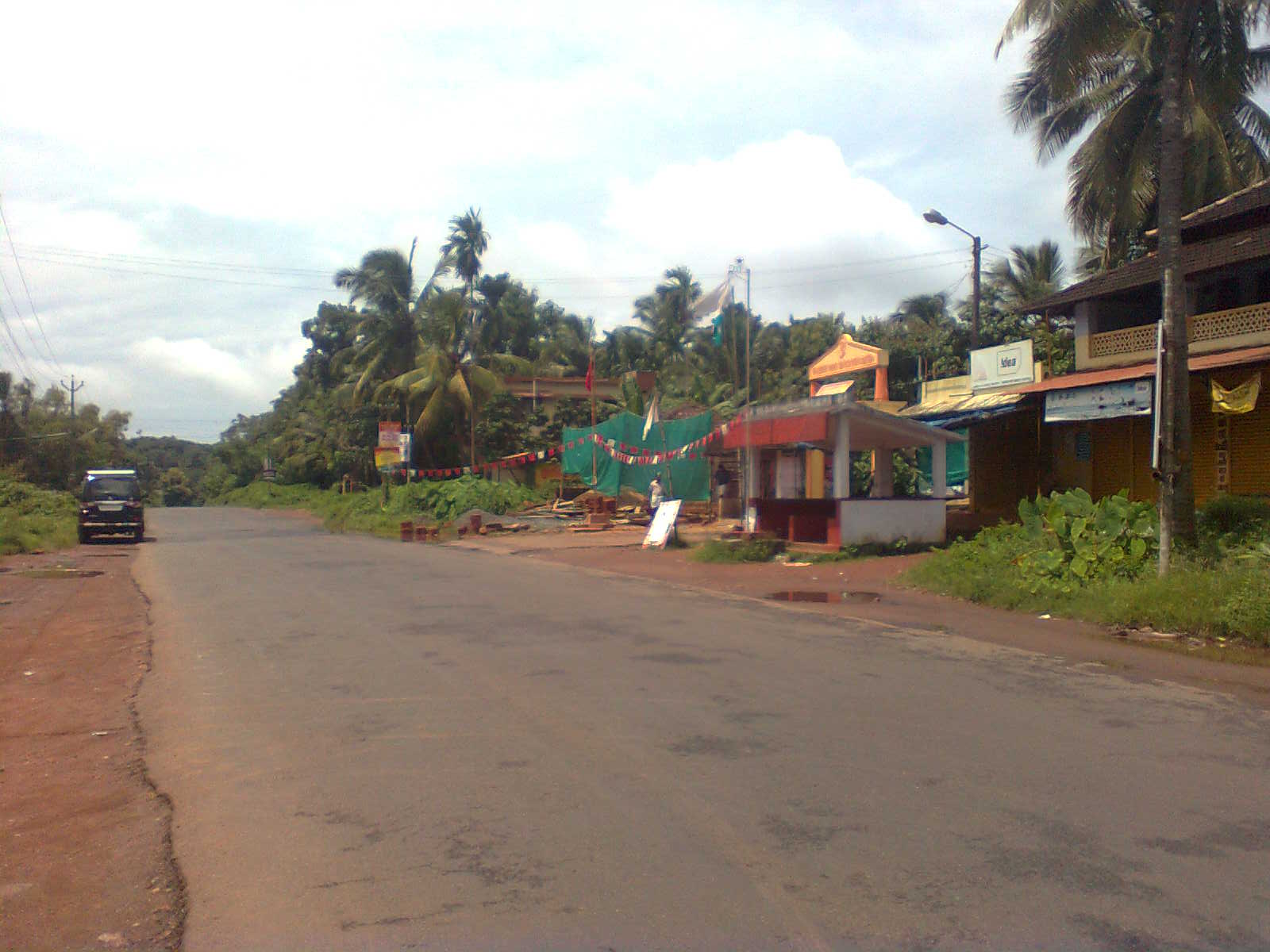
Aduthila Bus stop

Aduthila is a village near Pazhayangadi on the way to Pilathara on the KSTP Road in Kannur district, Kerala, India. It is located 2 km (1.2 mi) north of Pazhayangadi and 5 km (3.1 mi) south of Pilathara. It is part of Ezhome Grama Panchayat. The name Aduthila literally means the nearest home in Malayalam, aduth means near and illam means home.

== Temples ==
Aduthila contains multiple temples but no mosques or churches. Temples at Aduthila include:

- Theru Sree Bhagavathi Kshetram
- Aduthila Sree Deivamiruvar Kshethram
- Paaranthatta Mahavishnu Kshethram

== Schools ==
Education includes an LP school, a UP school at Neruvambram, and HS, higher secondary, and college at Madayi. The EMS memorial library at Aduthila provides a wide range of book collections. It also holds a good educational VCD DVD collection, an IT room.

== Sports ==
Aduthila has a Kolkali team known as Aduthila sree deivamiruvar kshethram kolkkali sangham. This kolkkali team trains children.

The 'Red Stars of Aduthila' is a club known for its volleyball players. GVC Aduthila is a club which holds sports & cultural festivals.

== Transportation ==
The national highway passes through Pilathara Junction. Goa and Mumbai can be accessed on the northern side and Cochin and Thiruvananthapuram can be accessed on the southern side. The road to the east of Iritty connects to Mysore and Bangalore. The nearest railway station is Pazhayangadi on Mangalore-Palakkad line. Trains are available to almost all parts of India subject to advance booking over the internet. There are airports at Kannur Mangalore and Calicut. All of them are international airports but direct flights are available only to Middle Eastern countries.
