= Pazhayangadi =

Pazhayangadi Payangadi
- Town
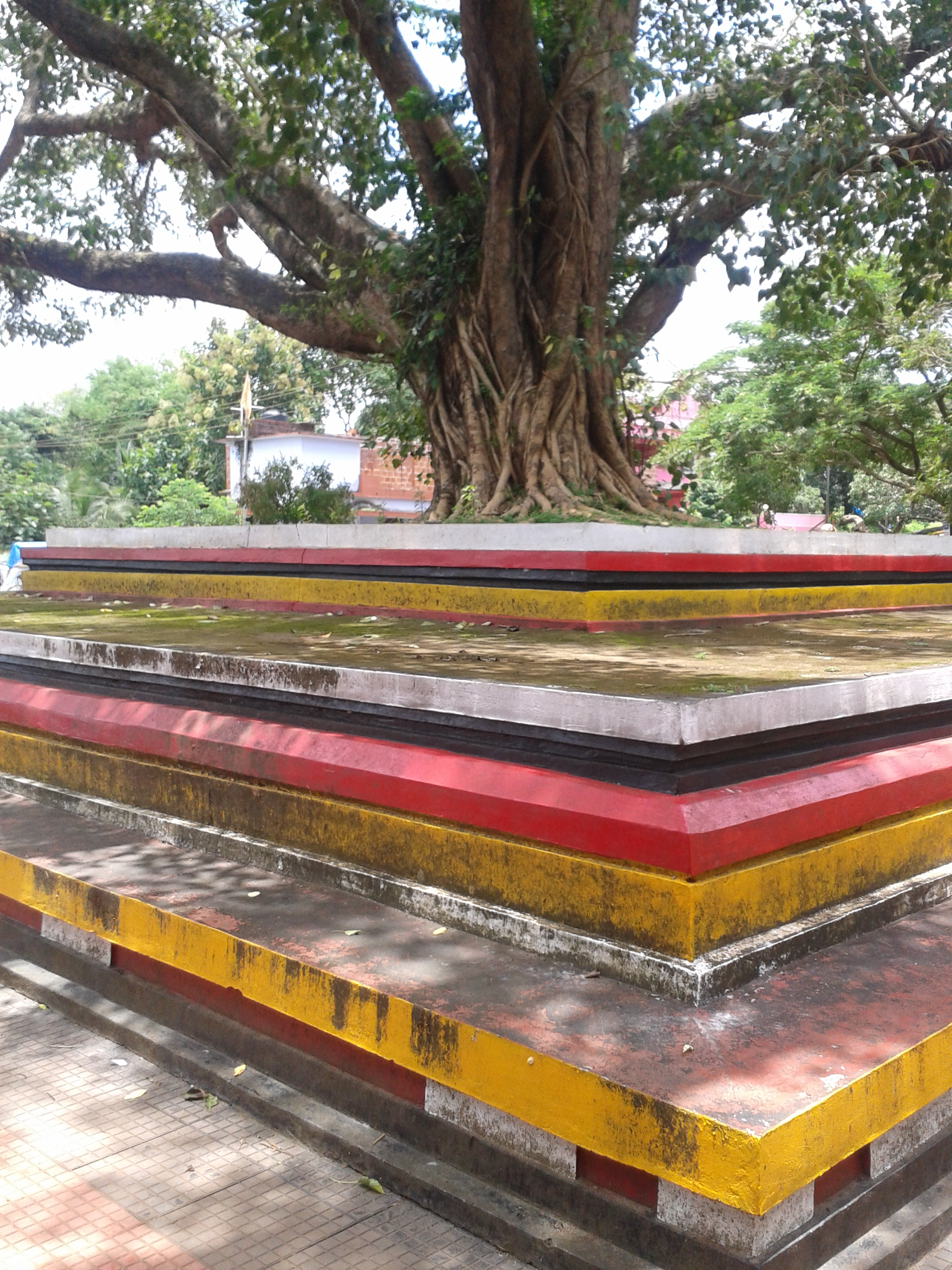
- Madayi Kavu, Pazhayangadi

- Location in Kerala, India Pazhayangadi (India)
- Coordinates: 12.0189°N 75.2588°E
- Country: India
- State: Kerala
- District: Kannur
- Taluk: Payyanur

Government
  - Type: Panchayati raj (India)
  - Body: Madayi Grama Panchayat & Ezhome Grama Panchayat

Area
  - Total: 37.17 km^{2} (14.35 sq mi)
- Elevation: 10 m (33 ft)

Population
  - Total: 55,149
  - Density: 1,484/km^{2} (3,843/sq mi)

Languages
  - Official: Malayalam, English
- Time zone: UTC+5:30 (IST)
- PIN: 670358,670303,670334,670305
- ISO 3166 code: IN-KL
- Vehicle registration: KL-86
- Nearest Towns: Kannur, Payyanur, Taliparamba
- Lok Sabha constituency: Kasaragod
- Assembly constituency: Kalliasseri

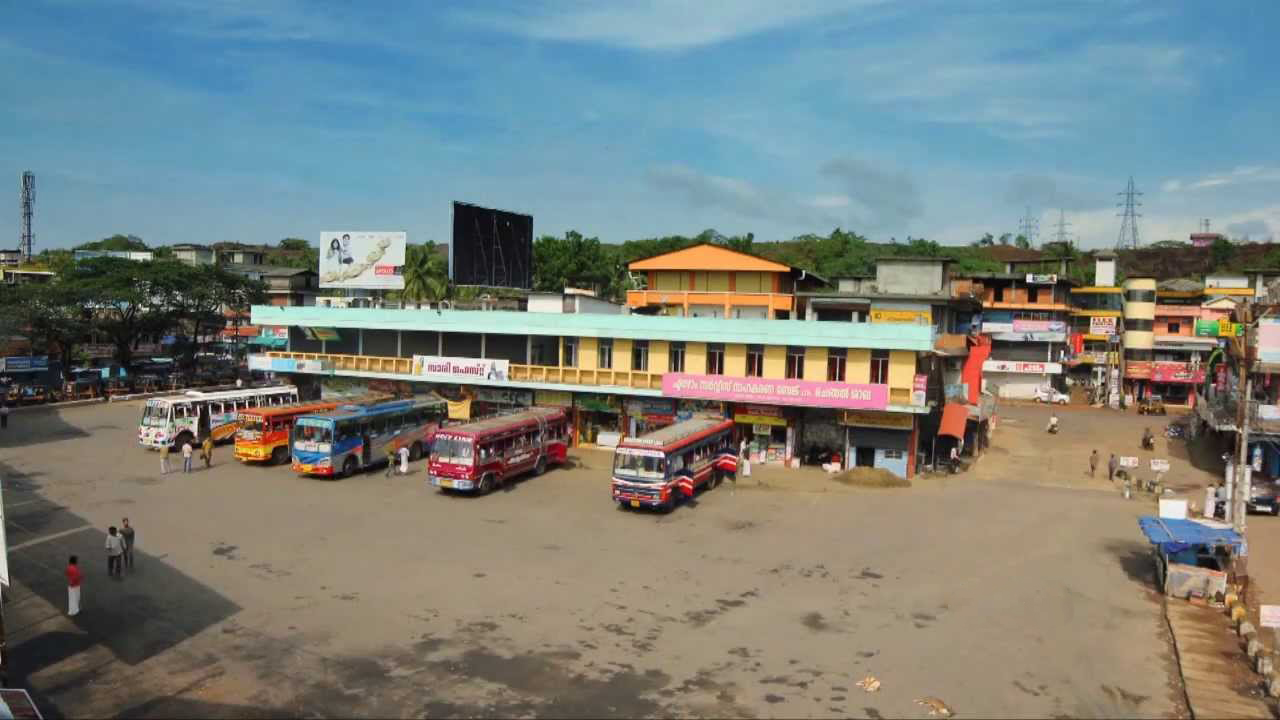
Pazhayangadi Bus Station

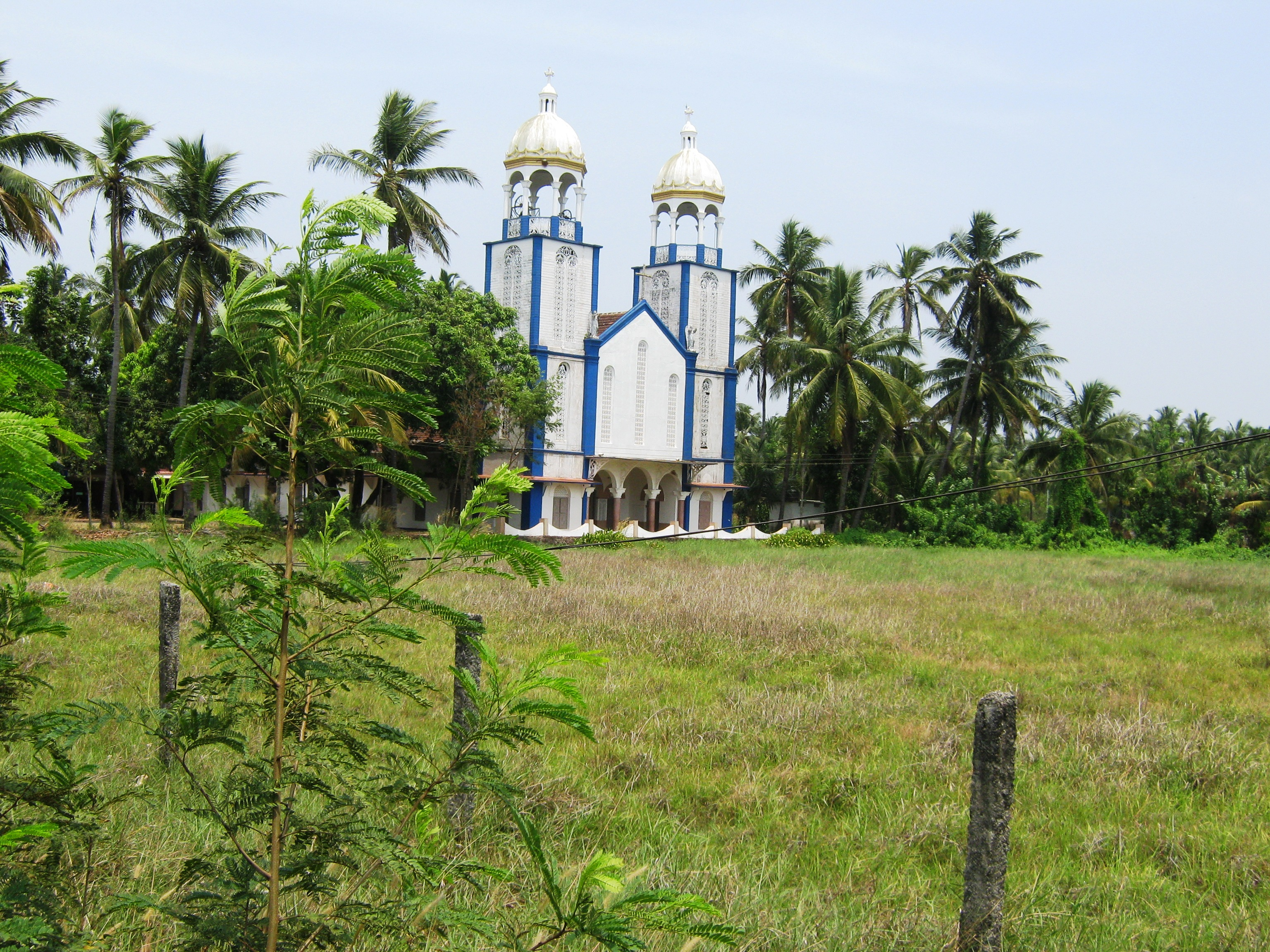
Thavam Church

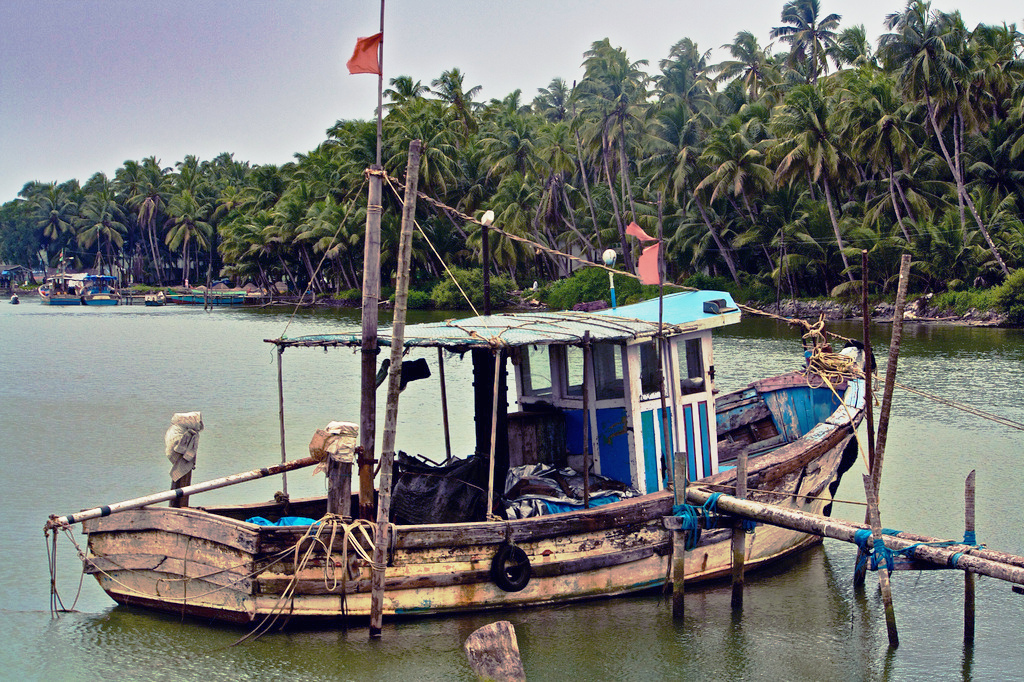
Boat service to Kannur

Pazhayangadi (Also called Payangadi), is a small township, approximately 23 km (14 mi) north of district headquarters Kannur, 13.5 km (8.4 mi) south of Payyanur and 13.5 km (8.4 mi) west of Taliparamba in the Indian state of Kerala. In Malayalam, the name literally means "Old Market". The town is bounded by Madayi Hills to the west and by the Pazhayangadi River to the south. Ezhimala, a hill range believed to be home to various medicinal herbs including Mrithasanjeevini and with ancient recorded history, is situated approximately 8 km (5.0 mi) west of Pazhayangadi. Pazhayangadi town spans the Madayi and Ezhome Grama Panchayats. Madayipara offers views of the Ezhimala range, which translates to "chain of seven hills", and is the location of the Indian Naval Academy.

== Etymology ==
The name Pazhayangadi originated from the king name 'Pazhi'. Pazhi was defeated in pazhi war.

== History ==
From before the period of known history, some chapters of the Ramayana and local Hindu legends associate the Ezhimala Hills with the famous epic, in particular with Lord Hanuman.

Ezhimala, Pazhayangadi, and several villages and towns in this region find plenty of mention in the extant Tamil Sangam Period's literature (500 BC to 300 AD). Pazhayangadi is the present corrupted form of its ancient name of Pazhi. Pazhi is mentioned as the ancient capital of King Udayan Venmon Nannan (known as Nannan or Nandan) of the Mushika or Kolathiri Royal Family. Though the Dynasty of Nannans was a cousin or sister dynasty of the Cheras and Pandyas and Cholas, warfare among them was nearly consistent, and the period of Nannan was no exception. There are texts that speak of Nannan fighting heroic battles at Pazhi against the Chera Kings who invaded his kingdom (Kolathunadu). Eventually, Nannan was killed in battle by the Chera king, Narmudi Cheral. Like the other kings of the then Tamilakam cultural polity, Narmudi Cheral was a great patron of scholars and poets, and he once gifted his court-poet, Kappiyattu Kappiyanar with 40 lakhs gold coins, as a token of his poetic genius.

Extant Tamil Sangam texts describe the glory and wealth of the ancient Pazhi in the highest terms. Sangam Era poets, as well as Classical Tamil poets of later centuries, like Paranar speak of the wealth of Pazhi in the greatest degree. One of the Sangam pieces, Akam 173 speaks of "Nannan's great mountain slopes where gold fields abound, and long bamboos dried in the Sun burst and released the unfinished pearls." Noted scholar, Elamkulam Kunjan Pillai states that "It is from Kottayam (of North Malabar) and Cannanore regions of old Ezhimalainad that innumerable Roman (gold) coins have been excavated. On one (single) occasion (gold) coins that could be carried by six porters were obtained. These coins were found to belong to the period down to 491 AD".

The Mooshaka Vamsam, written on the Mushika (Kolathiri) family of Nannan in the Eleventh Century, also mentions Pazhayangadi several times.

== Ezhimala Hills ==
Pazhayangadi is just 8 kilometers away from Ezhimala which was the later Capital of the Kolathiri Dynasty. Pazhayangadi is famous for the Madayi Kavu which was a temple associated with the Kolathiris (Mushika Kings). The Madayi village which includes Pazhayangadi, is mentioned as Marahi in extant ancient texts, which was a famous port of the ancient times. Pazhayangadi has a lot of temples, such as the Vadakunda Shiva Temple at Madayi Para, and the Eripuram Sree Krishna Temple. The Tharapuram Sree Durgambika Temple is also a well-known temple at Pazhayangadi; and is well-known for its Kalampattu; the name Tharapuram itself derived from the name of the Goddess Thara (Uchulikadavathu Bagavathi). Sree Durga, along with Yakshiyamma is worshiped here. The recorded history of Pazhayangadi and nearby places which belonged to the Kolathunadu, is described in the book 'Kolathupuzha', written by MP Kumaran.

== Administration ==
Pazhayangadi town is administered by Ezhome and Madayi Grama Panchayats under Kalliassery Block Panchayat. Pazhayangadi is politically a part of Kalliasseri Assembly constituency under Kasaragod Lok Sabha constituency.

== Law and Order ==
The town comes under the jurisdiction of Pazhayangadi police station, which was opened on 29-09-1959. This police station is part of Payyanur subdivision under Kannur rural police district.

== Educational Institutions ==
- College of Applied Science, Neruvambaram
- Crescent B.Ed College, Madayipara
- Crescent College of Pharmaceutical Science
- Co-operative Arts and Science College, Madayi
- Wadihuda Institute

== Economy ==
The local economy is based upon fisheries and agriculture. Majority of the locals are working in Persian Gulf countries and their remittances also contribute to the economy in a major way.

== Environmental movements ==
Pazhayangadi is well known for environmental movements like Mangrove Conservation and Movement against Sand Mining. Noted environmentalist Kallen Pokkudan is from Pazhayangadi. A woman from Pazhayangadi called Jazeera appeared in a BBC report in 2013 because of her lone fight against sand mining in Kerala.

== Transportation ==
Pazhayangadi town lies on the Pilathara-Pappinisseri KSTP road which act as bypass to National Highway. The National Highway 66 passes through Pilathara junction, which is 6.5 km from the Pazhayangadi town. Goa and Mumbai can be accessed on the northern side and Kochi and Thiruvananthapuram can be accessed on the southern side. Other major roads are Pazhayangadi-Ezhome-Taliparamba road, Pazhayangadi-Madayi-Ezhimala road and Pazhayangadi-Puthiyangadi road.

Pazhayangadi has several private buses plying places inside the Kannur district. Pazhayangadi is well-connected to its suburbs through several bus services. Pazhayangadi town has one bus terminal - Pazhayangadi Bus Stand.

The nearest railway station is Pazhayangadi on Shoranur-Mangalore section of the Southern Railway zone. Trains are available to almost all parts of India subject to advance booking over the internet. There are airports at Kannur, Mangalore and Calicut . All of them are international airports but direct flights are available only to Middle Eastern countries.

== Notable people ==
- Vineeth Kumar, film actor, director
- Saranya Sasi, film actress
- Kallen Pokkudan, environmental activist
- Ibrahim Vengara, Malayalam playwright

== See also ==
- Ettammal
- Mattool
- Madayi
- Cherukunnu
- Ezhome
- Madayi kavu
- Madayi Palli
