= Ezhome Rice =

Varieties of red rice

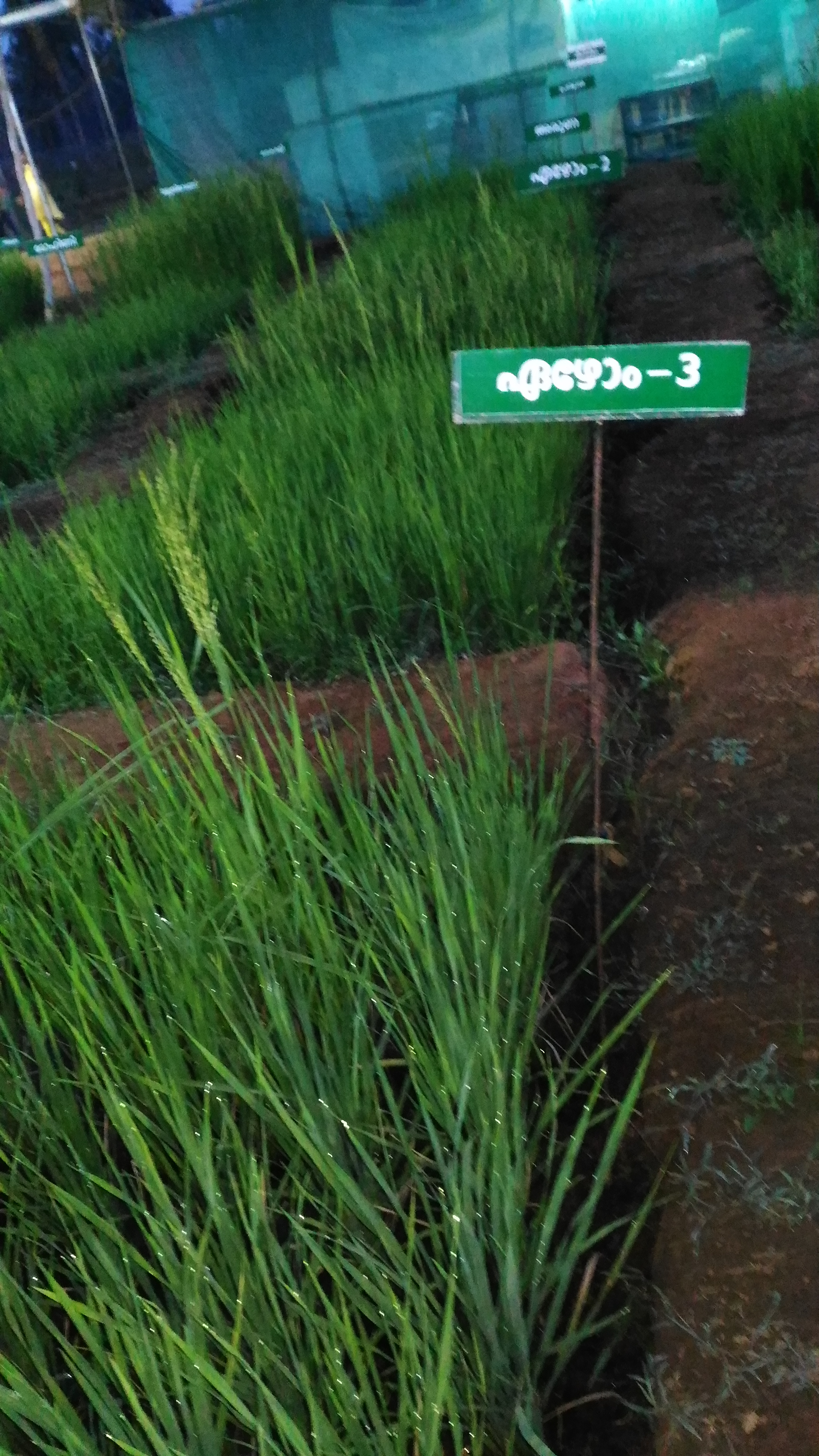
- Ezhome paddy cultivation at the Regional Agricultural Institute at Pilicode, Kasaragod district
- Cultivar group: Ezhome Rice
- Origin: Kerala
- Cultivar group members: 'Ezhome-1'; 'Ezhome-2'

Ezhome Rice varieties Ezhome-1 and Ezhome–2 are the first high yielding, non-lodging organic red rice varieties. They are designed for the saline-prone Kaipad rice fields of Kerala. They yield awn-less, non-shattering grains, and favourable cooking qualities, better than local cultivars. The average yields of Ezhome-1 and Ezhome-2 are 3.5 tonnes/ha and 3.2 tonnes/ha respectively under close-planted and no-management conditions of Kaipad. This yield is 70% and 60% more than that of local cultivars. These varieties differ in duration, have distinct morphological and qualitative traits, and have different salinity tolerance mechanisms, imparting varietal diversity to the unique ecosystem of Kaipad.

These new seed varieties have been developed by the Kerala Agricultural University with the participation of farmers of Ezhome panchayat. This is the first venture of Kerala Agricultural University in development of a variety i) adopting the combined strategy of Global Breeding (traditional), and participatory plant breeding, and ii) carrying out all stages of variety development directly in the problem area of farmers.
