= Vengara (Kannur district) =

- village
- Interactive map of Vengara
- Coordinates: 12°02′05″N 75°14′49″E
- Country: India
- State: Kerala
- District: Kannur

Government
  - Body: Madayi Grama Panchayat

Languages
  - Official: Malayalam, English
- Time zone: UTC+5:30 (IST)
- PIN: 670305
- ISO 3166 code: IN-KL
- Vehicle registration: KL-86

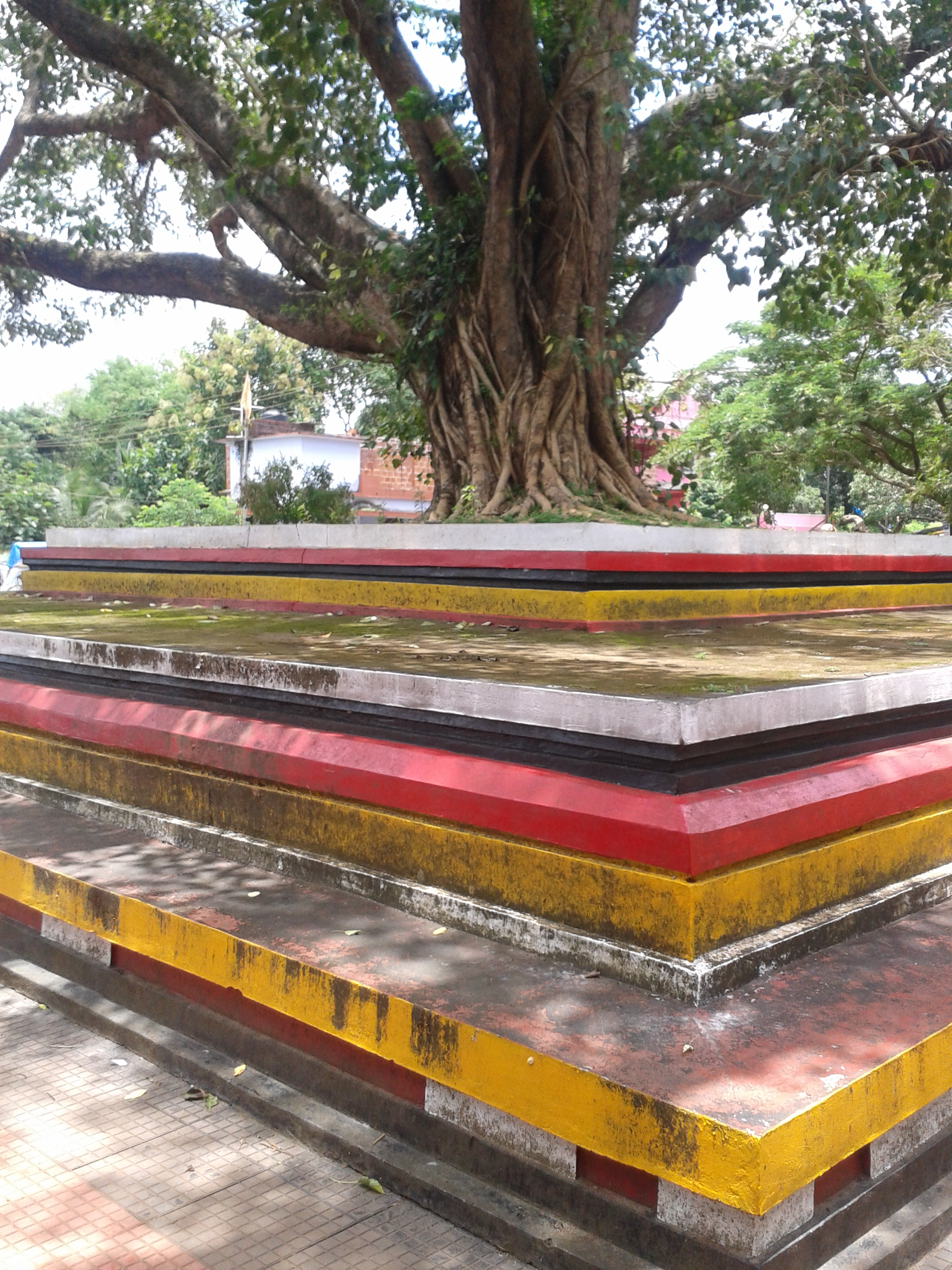
Madayi Kavu

Vengara is a village in Kannur district, Kerala, India. It is situated in the Madayi grama panchayat near the town of Pazhayangadi. The area postal pin code is 670305.

== Etymology ==
The word vengara comes from ven kara meaning "white land" created by moving sea.

== History ==
Protected by Ezhimala and Madayippara, the Village Vengara has witnessed many historical events. Ezhimala was the Capital of ancient Ezhimala Kingdom and now this place the headquarters of the Indian Naval Academy (the largest of its kind in Asia). The history reveals that Tipu Sultan, the Ruler of Mysore has passed through this place during his battle forward to Kerala. Still the remains of a fort belongs to Tipu lying on Madayippara. He made a canal between Payangadi River and Moolakkeel River, called ‘Sultan Thodu’ (Sultan Canal) for the easy movement of cargo. Now, this canal has an important role to do with the proposed ‘Malabar Tourism Promotion Program.’ Historians say that once this place was a part of Arabian Sea hundreds of years ago. When the sea withdrew at last, there remained sandy land which people called ‘Ven Kara’ (White land in local tongue). Later ‘Ven Kara’ became Vengara by use.

== Sree Muchilot Kavu, Vengara ==
Vengara, a village near Pazhayangadi enters into the tourism map of Kerala as a result of the proposed Perumkaliyattam at Sree Muchilot Kavu in January 2009. describes how the Perumkaliyattams becomes a festival of the people irrespective of caste, class, creed or religion. The perumkaliyattam consistes of several customs and rituals like Varachuvekkal, kalnattu karmam, kalavara niraykkal, upadevadha theyyattams, vellattam and then the thirumudi nivaral of Muchilot Bagavathi. As prasadam feast is organised in a grand manner by giving food to more than a lakh devotees. It symbolises the marriage of Muchilottamma.

== Transportation ==
The national highway passes through Taliparamba town. Goa and Mumbai can be accessed on the northern side and Cochin and Thiruvananthapuram can be accessed on the southern side. The road to the east of Iritty connects to Mysore and Bangalore. The nearest railway station is Pazhayangadi on Mangalore-Palakkad line. Trains are available to almost all parts of India subject to advance booking over the internet. There are airports at Mangalore and Calicut. Both of them are international airports but direct flights are available only to Middle Eastern countries.
