= Ibrahim Vengara =

Indian playwright

Ibrahim Vengara is a Malayalam–language playwright from Kerala, India. He has written over 50 radio plays, 25 plays and 20 monologues.

He was born on 1 August 1941 at Vengara in North Malabar as the son of Seythammadath Alikunji and Puthiya Veettil Kunjamina. His father died when he was barely three years old. He started his primary school education at Vengara Mappila Upper Primary School but the study ended in two years. Later, he learned to read and write Malayalam from an old age school, which was under the auspices of the Public Library, Taliparamba. At the age of 13, he left home. He travelled across India and did all kinds of jobs in different parts of the country.

His relationship with theatre movement began in 1962. His first work, Arthi, won first prize in a drama competition in 1965. He has worked in theatre groups Thrissur Silpi and Kozhikode Sangamam. His drama troupe Chirantana has presented some of the best professional plays Malabar has ever seen. He was imprisoned during the Emergency for writing the play Bhoothavanam. His works Ezhil Chovva and Upaharam won the award from Akashvani for best radio play in the years 1989-'90 and 1992 -'93 respectively. These plays were translated and broadcast in 14 Indian languages. He received the Kerala Sangeetha Nataka Akademi Award for Drama in 1995. His work Rajasabha won the Kerala Sahitya Akademi Award for Drama in 1997. His autobiography Green Room won the Kerala Sahitya Akademi Award for Biography and Autobiography in 2015.

Ibrahim Vengara has served as Kerala Sangeetha Nataka Academy member, Purogamana Kala Sahitya Sangham State Council Member, Akashvani Kozhikode Programme Advisory Board member, and Kerala Drama Workers Welfare Association State Council member.

== Works ==
- Arthi (1965)
- Valmikam (1971)
- Utharam (1982)
- Ezhil Chovva (1989-'90)
- Upaharam (1992-'93)
- Padanilam (1994)
- Malikaveedu
- Rajasabha
- Oru Ithihasa Kavyam

== Awards ==
- 1997: Kerala Sahitya Akademi Award for Drama - Rajasabha
- 2015: Kerala Sahitya Akademi Award for Biography and Autobiography - Green Room
- 2010: Thikkodiyan Award
