= Sand mining in Kerala =

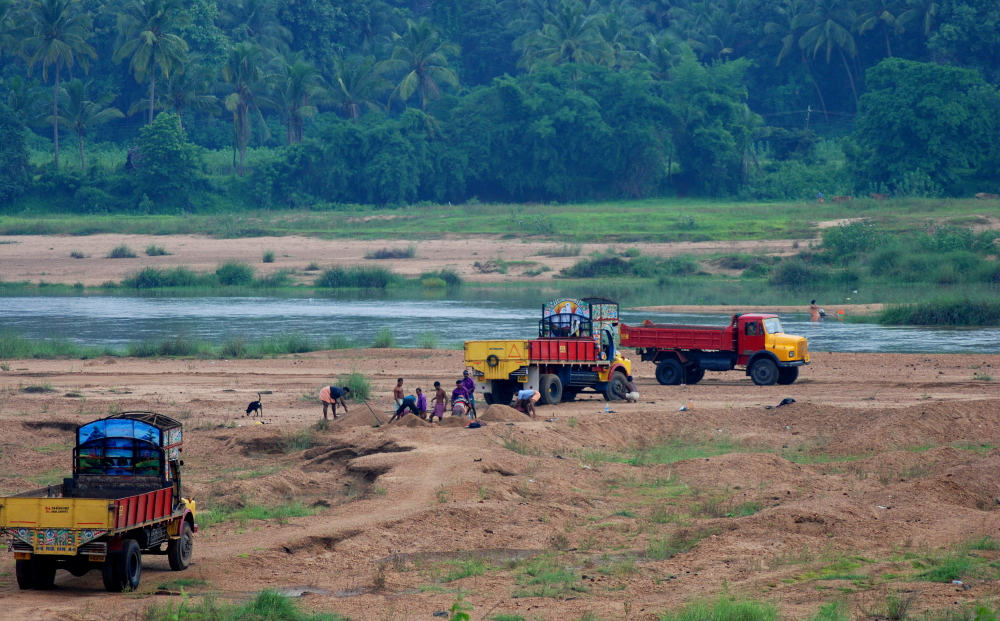
Trucks being used to remove sand from the Bharathappuzha River

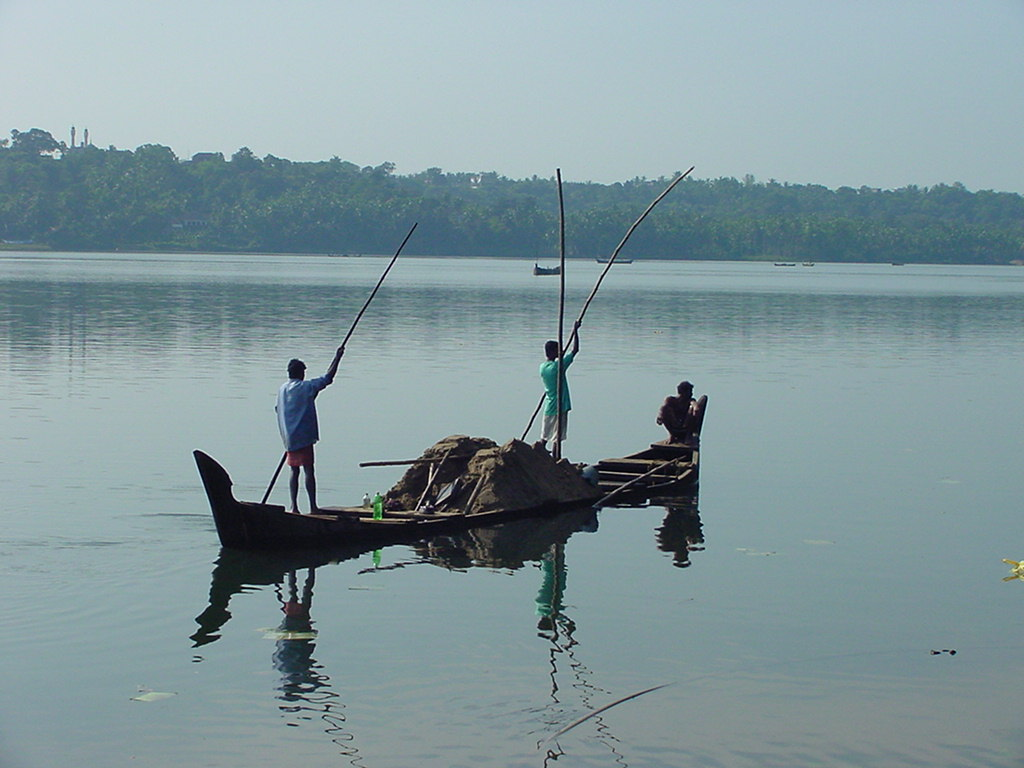
Sand miners in Parassinikkadavu

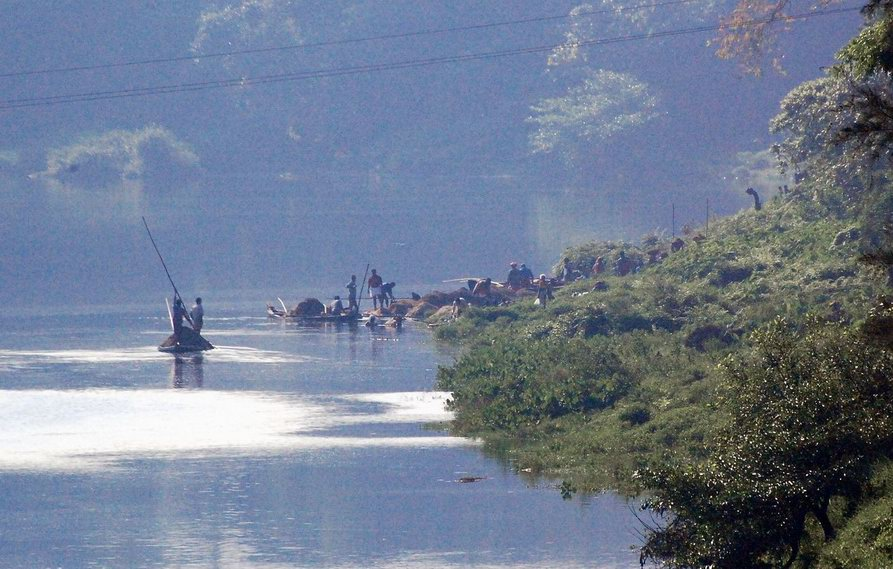
Sand Mining in Chalakudy

Sand mining is a serious issue of environmental concern in the Kerala province of India. Even though sand mining is banned in most parts of Kerala, it is going on secretly because of the big demand of sand in the booming construction of the state.

== Periyar River ==
Sand mining is a serious threat to most of the rivers in Kerala but the case is more visible in Periyar River. The indiscriminate mining has even affected the stability of Sree Sankara Bridge at Kalady.

According to D. Padmalal, head of the Environmental Science division, National Center for Earth Science Studioes, this kind of mindless mining has created big problems to the rivers of the state. Four people died from drowning in the Periyar at Kalady on Friday due to illegal sand mining.

== Legislation and banning ==
The high court of Kerala has banned mining within one km radius of bridges but the state government is permitting mining even within 500 meters of the bridge. Illegal sand mining has created about 800 pits on the Periyar river. In June 2015, the government of Kerala banned mining in six rivers of Kerala for a period of three years.

== Jazeera's fight ==
Jazeera, a female environmentalist, from Madayi village in Kannur District, Kerala has recently staged a sit in strike against sand mining before the Kerala House in New Delhi. She was accompanied by her three children. Her fight was not successful except for making the central government send a letter on the issue to the provincial government of Kerala. Jazeera got wide coverage for the issue on various Indian and foreign media including the BBC. According to one study by the Government Brennen College, Thalassery, Jaseera was isolated in the Kerala society because of its strong patriarchal nature.
