= Kaipad rice =

Kaipad fields are salinity-prone natural organic rice cultivation fields in the northern districts of Kerala, India. The traditional kaipad system of rice cultivation is an integrated organic farming system in which rice cultivation and aquaculture go together in coastal brackish water marshes rich in organic matter. It has been included in the Geographical indication (GI) registry in the country which is part of the Intellectual property regime.

Ezhome Rice has been developed specifically for this environment.
