= Madayi Mosque =

Mosque in Pazhayangadi, Kannur, Kerala, India

- Location of the mosque in Kerala

Religion
- Affiliation: Sunni Islam
- Rite: Shāfiʿī
- Ecclesiastical or organisational status: Mosque
- Status: Active

Location
- Location: Pazhayangadi, Kannur district, northern Kerala
- Country: India
- Coordinates: 12°01′29″N 75°15′58″E

Architecture
- Type: Mosque architecture
- Style: Indo-Saracenic
- Founder: Malik ibn Dinar
- Completed: 518 AH (1124/1125 CE) (1st structure); 2006 (current structure)
- Materials: White marble

The Madayi Mosque, also known as the Matayi Palli, and as the Pazhayangadi Mosque or as the Malik ibn Dinar Mosque, Madayi, is a Shāfiʿī Sunni mosque, located at Pazhayangadi in the Kannur district in northern Kerala, India. It is one of the oldest mosques in Kerala, with local legends dating the mosque from 518 AH (1124/1125 CE).

== History ==
The mosque is believed to have been established by Malik ibn Dinar and contains a block of white marble said to have been brought from Mecca by ibn Dinar.

According to Shaikh Zain ud-Din Makhdum, the first qadi of the new mosque was Malik ibn 'Abdu Rahman.

== Legend ==
According to the Legend of Cheraman Perumals, the first Indian mosque was built in 624 CE at Kodungallur with the mandate of the last the ruler (the Cheraman Perumal) of Chera dynasty, who converted to Islam during the lifetime of Muhammad (c. 570 to 632 CE). According to Qissat Shakarwati Farmad, the mosques at Kodungallur, Kollam, Madayi, Barkur, Mangalore, Kasaragod, Kannur, Dharmadam, Panthalayini, and Chaliyam, were built during the era of Malik Dinar, and they are among the oldest Masjids in the Indian subcontinent. It is believed that Malik Dinar died at Thalangara in the town of Kasaragod. The Arabic inscription, on a copper slab within the Madayi Mosque, records its foundation year as 1124 CE. The 16th century Tuhfat Ul Mujahideen also records the history of Madayi.

The mosque contained a marker/plaque listing the year as 518 AH (1124/1125 CE) as the date of its construction. As a part of renovation, the old structure was pulled down in 2006, and a new structure in the Indo-Saracenic style was built on the old foundations. The marker was preserved and incorporated into the floor of the new building, but the original date is no longer legible.

=== Inscription ===
The inscription, translated from Arabic into English, reads:

"In the name of God, the Most Gracious, the Most Merciful. The mosques of God shall be visited and maintained by such as believe in God and the Last Day, establish regular prayers, and pay zakat, and fear none except God. It is they who are expected to be on true guidance. Dated on the 5[18]th year on Friday of Rabiul Akhir."

At the rear of the mosque an old wall was retained that incorporated the original mark of the qibla, while beside it stands the first mimbar, a simple and visibly ancient raised stone platform. The second mimbar, also old, has been retained in the new mosque. It has four carved wooden posts holding up a flat canopy that is covered with painted flowers on its interior.

The graves of two saints who were reportedly companions of Malik ibn Dinar were consigned to a rear room.

== See also ==
- Islam in India
- List of mosques in India
- List of mosques in Kerala
- List of oldest mosques in India
