= Madayipara =

- hillock and locality
- Interactive map of Madayipara
- Coordinates: 11°58′0″N 75°18′0″E
- Country: India
- State: Kerala
- District: Kannur

Languages
  - Official: Malayalam, English
- Time zone: UTC+5:30 (IST)
- ISO 3166 code: IN-KL
- Vehicle registration: KL-

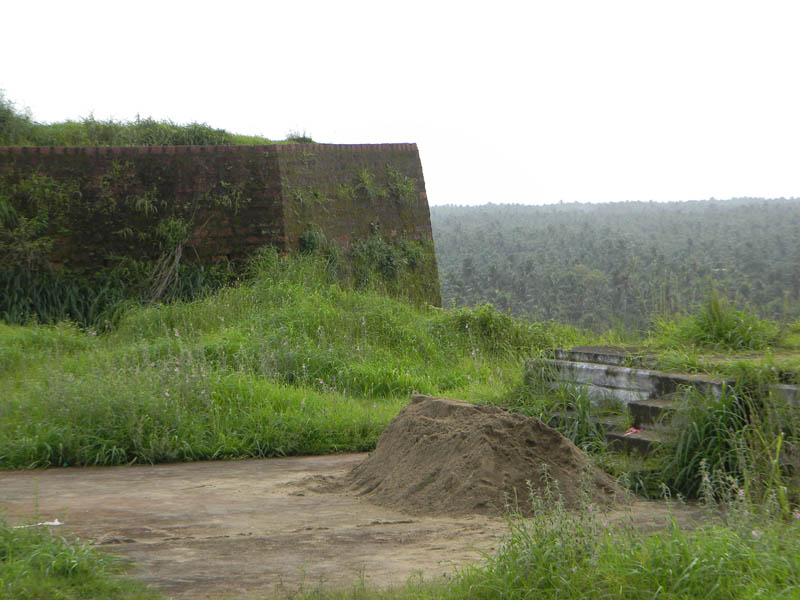
Madayi Fort

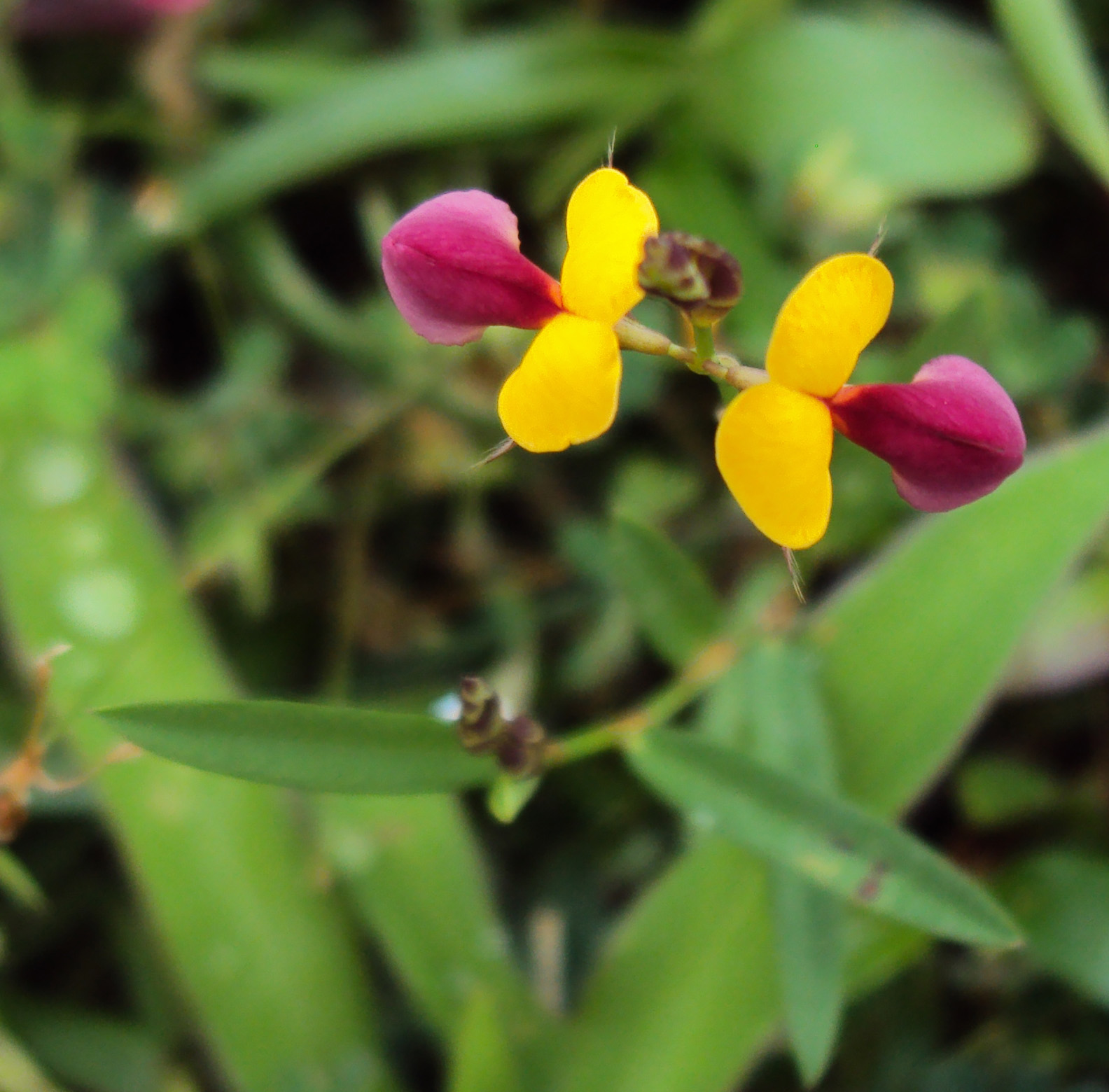
Alsicarpus bupleuriflius

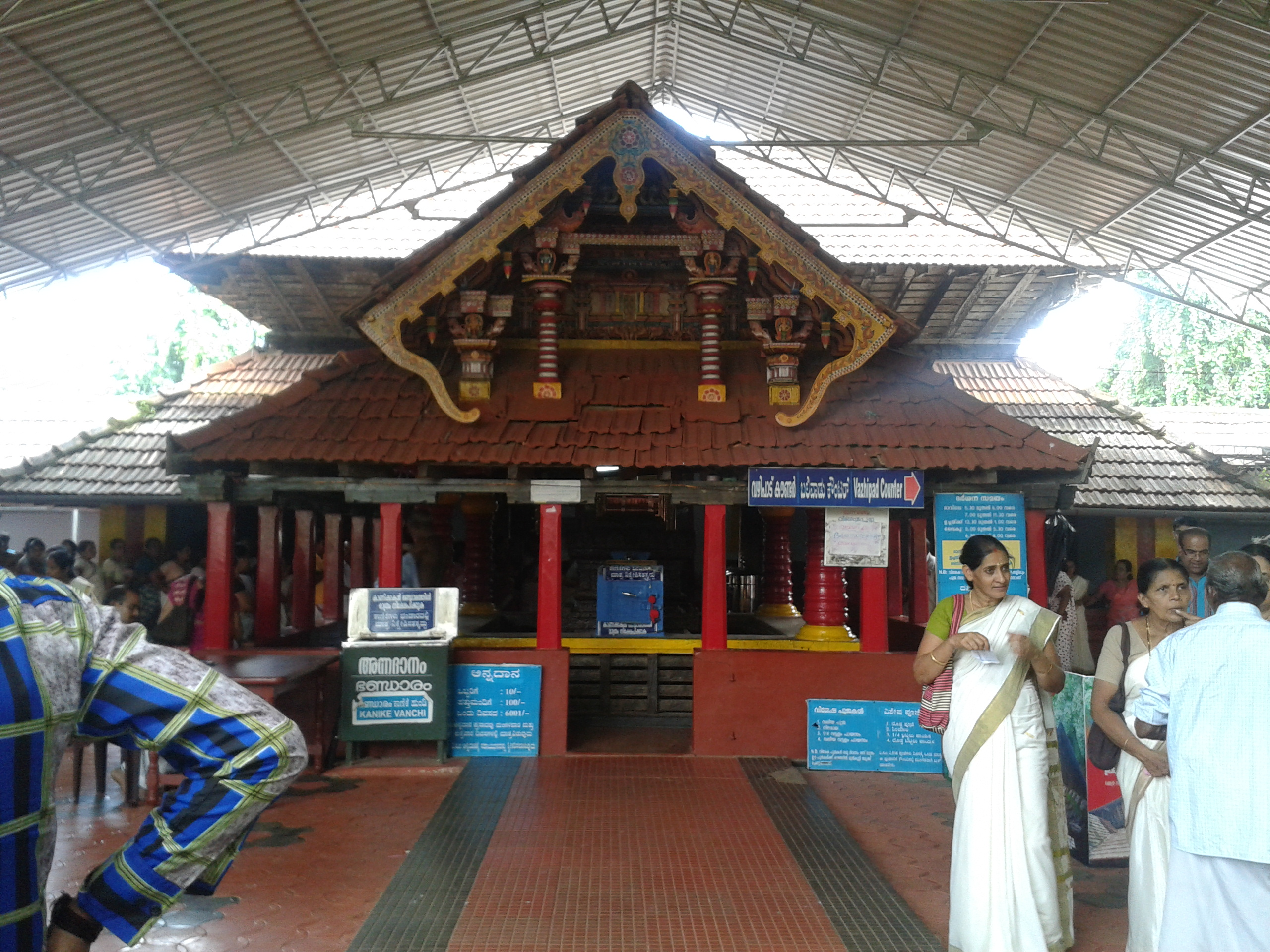
Madayi Kavu

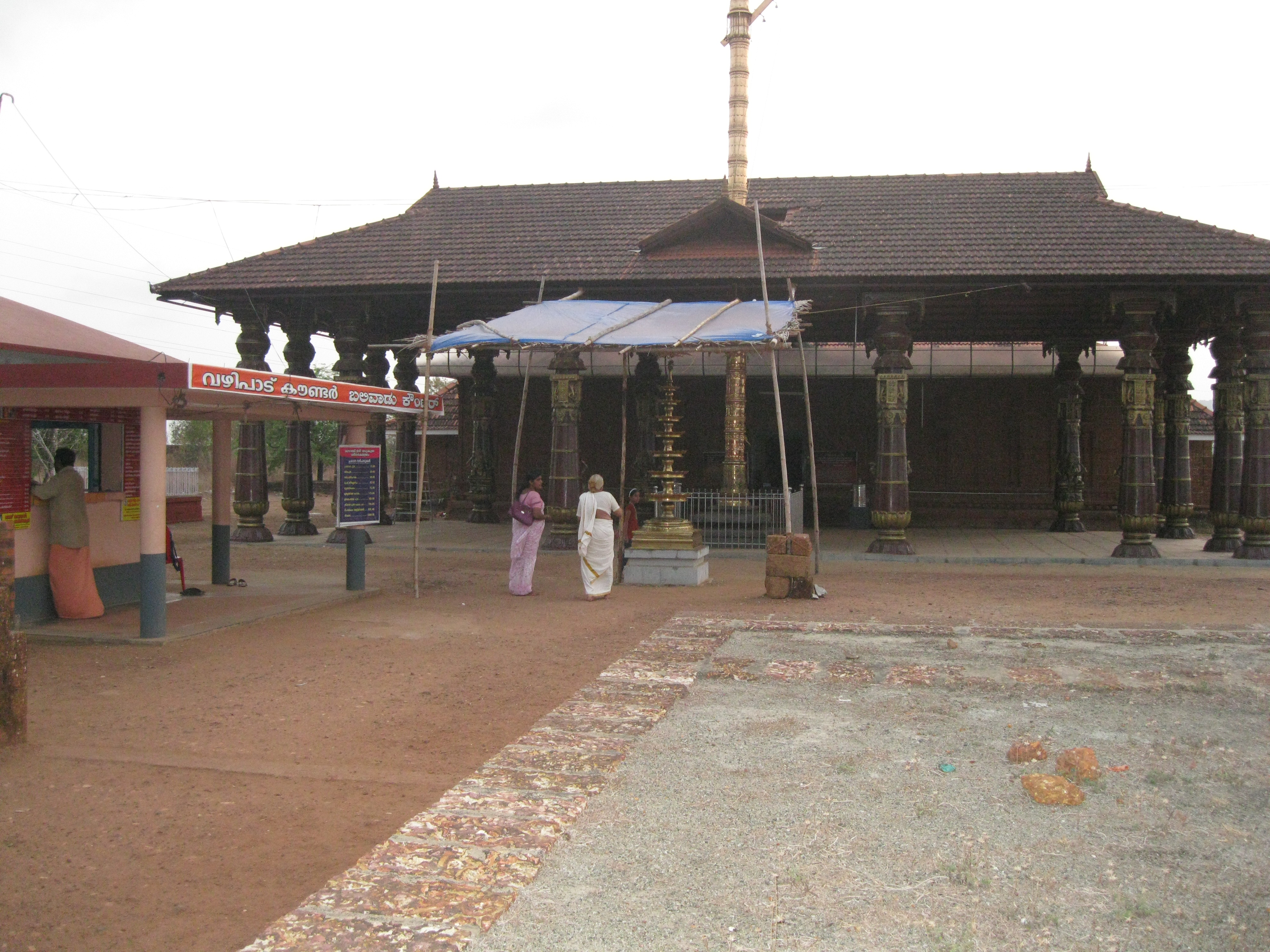
vadukunda siva temple

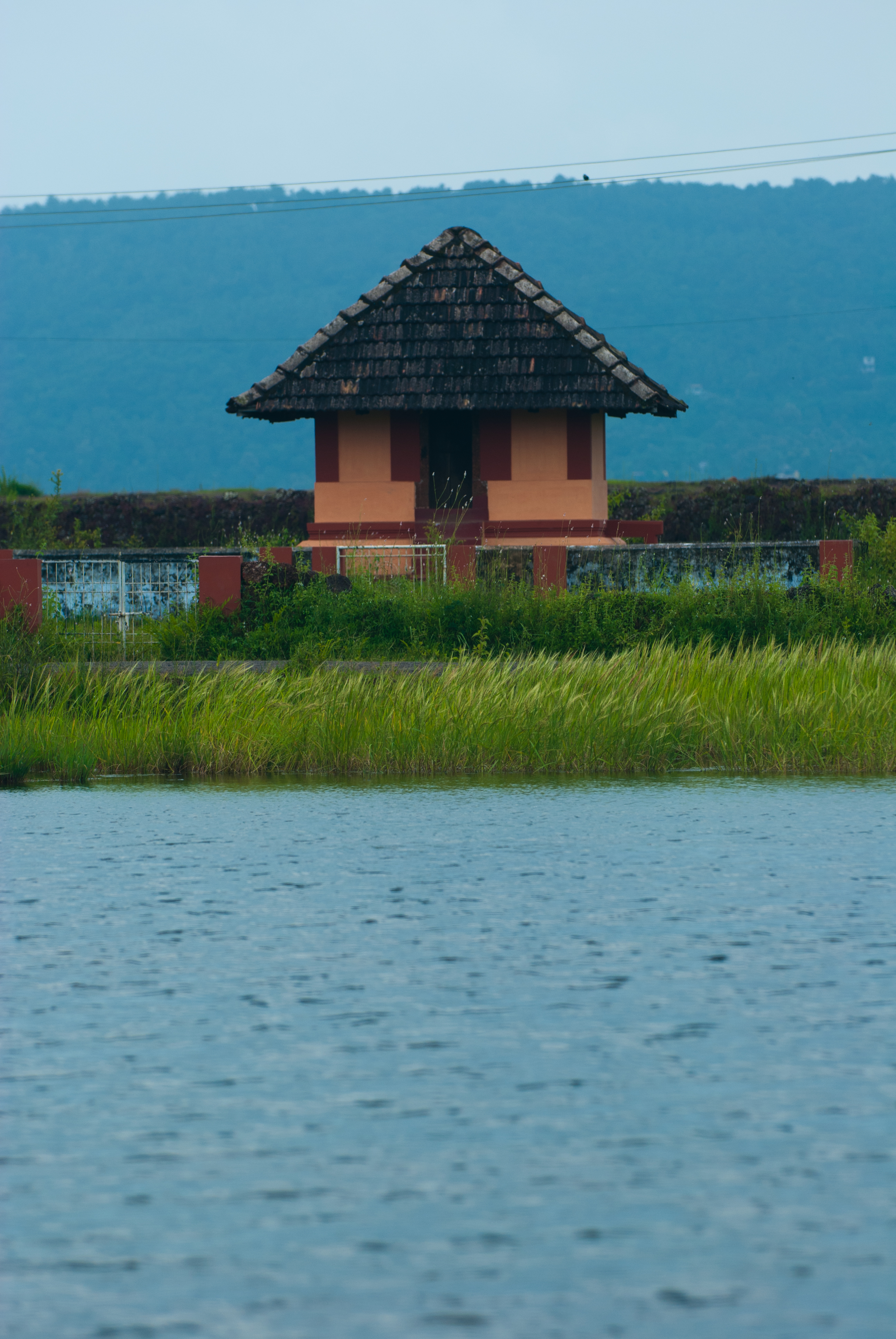
Kathiruvaykkum Thara

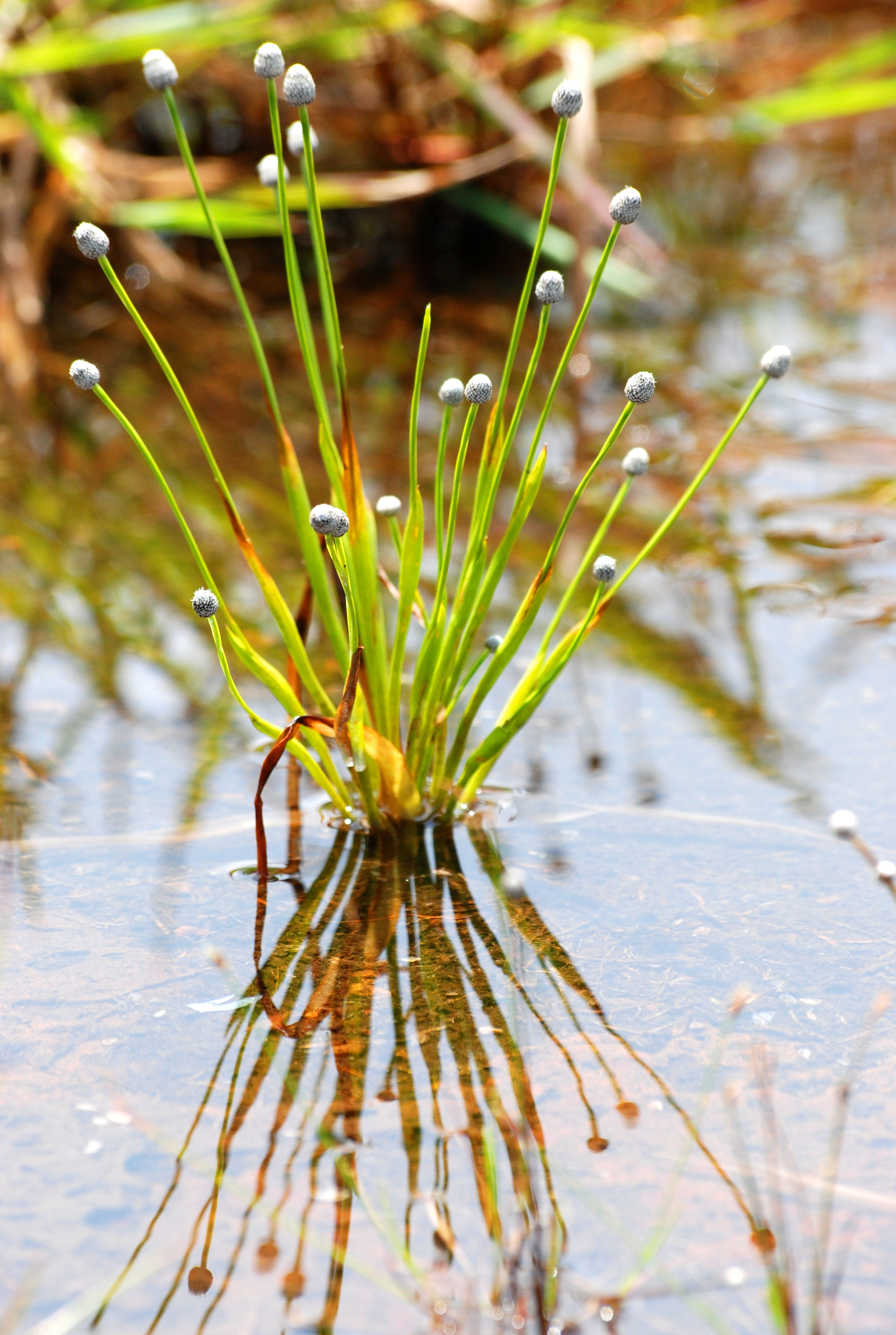
Eriocaulon madayiparense

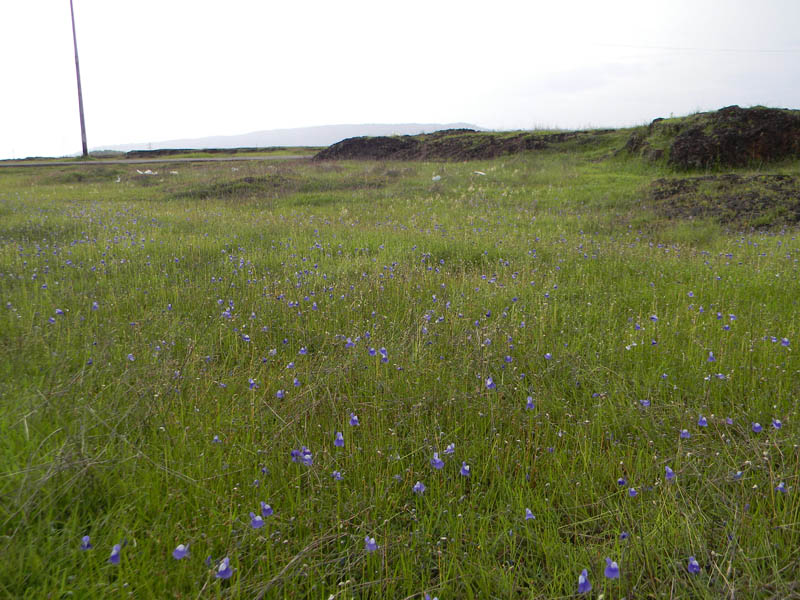
Madayippara in September

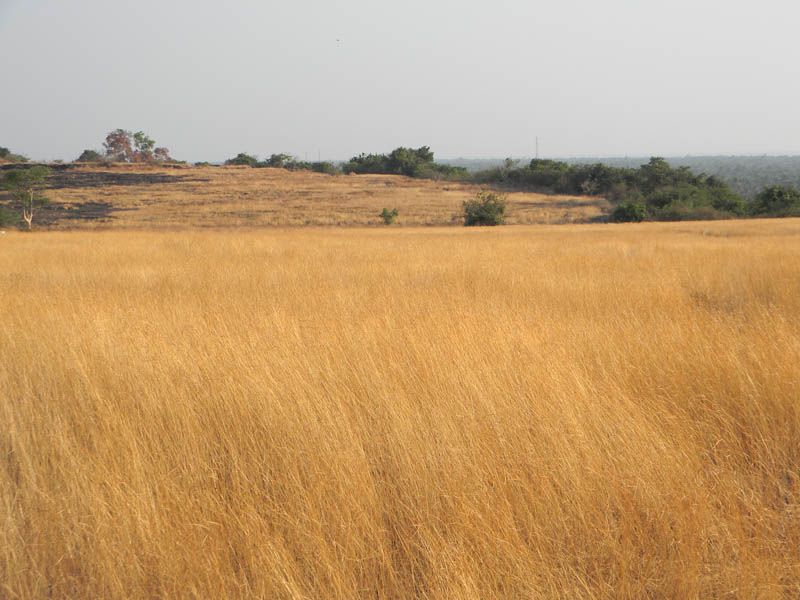
Madayippara in February

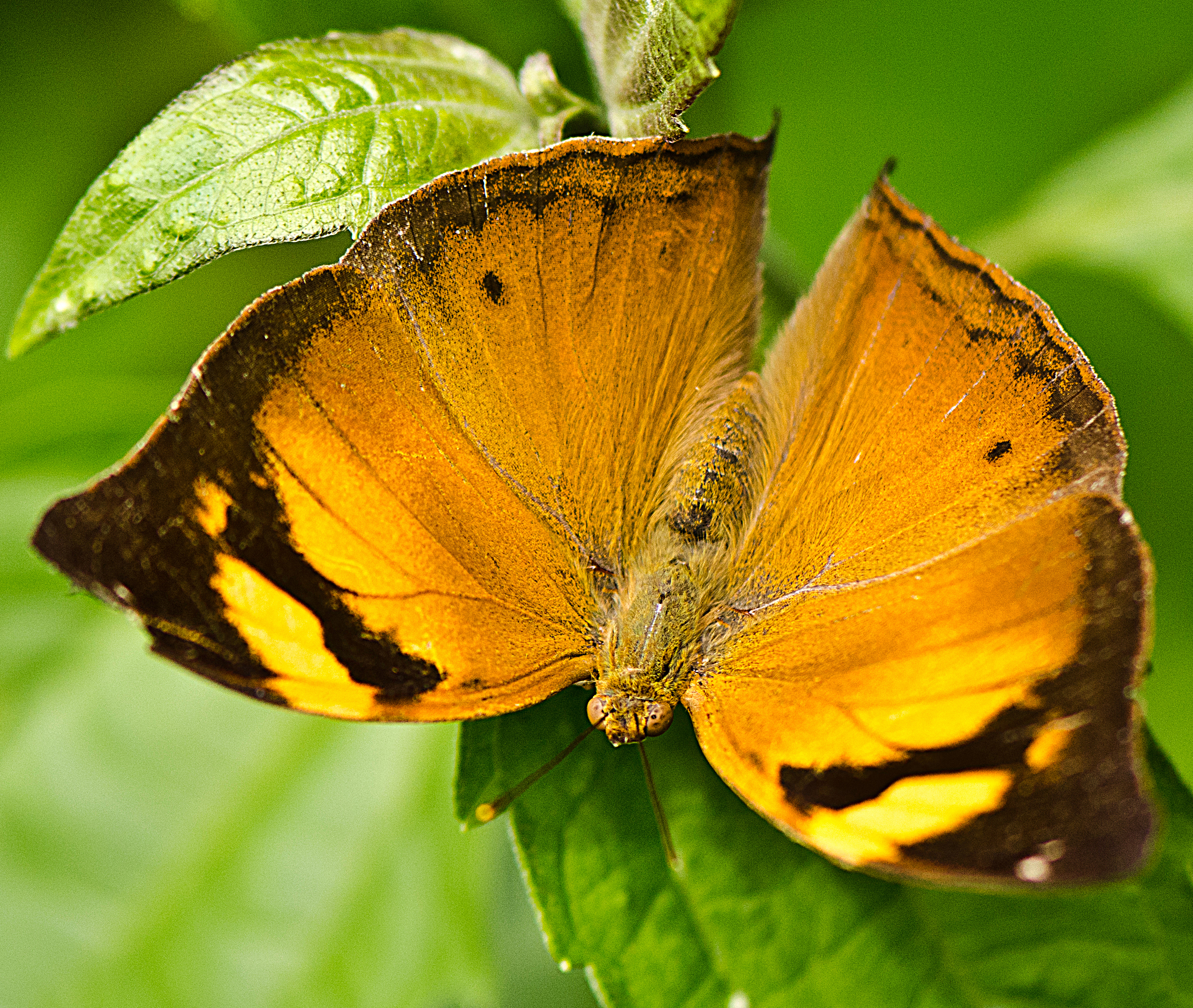
Autumn Leaf butterfly

Madayipara is a laterite hill plateau in Madayi, Kannur district, Kerala, India. It overlooks the town of Pazhayangadi on the northern bank of the Kuppam River. Spanning approximately 700-acre (280 ha), the flat tableland is known for its geological features, biodiversity, and cultural history.

It is popular being the site of the Madayi Kavu (Thiruvar Kadu Bhagavathi Temple) of Goddess Kali, Shakthi, the Vadukunnu Temple dedicated to Lord Shiva. The Shiva temple of Madayipara was razed by followers of Tippu Sultan in the 18th century. However, now it has been rebuilt.

The area is also known for the Malik Ibn Dinar mosque, which is believed to have been originally built by Malik Ibn Dinar, a Muslim preacher. The remnants of a fort built is also present here, and the part is known as Kottakunnu.

== Site description ==
Madayipara is located in the Madayi village, at latitude 12°2’ N and longitude 75°16’E, about 21 km north of Kannur town, the district headquarters of Kannur district in Kerala. As noted by William Logan (1887) in the Malabar Manual; the river Kuppam "bending slightly and passing under the guns of an old ruined fort of the Kolathiris" on the southeastern edge of Madayipara, suddenly turns due south at Payangadi and takes a course parallel to the sea to meet the larger Valapattanam river at Matakkara, finally discharging into the Lakshadweep Sea at Azhikkal.

The available geo-morphological and historical data suggest that, till 1450 A.D. this river was drained into the sea, flowing west from Payangadi instead of turning south. On the northwest of Madayipara lie the wetlands of Chemballikkundu and Kunhimangalam formed by the Ramapuram River, Peruvamba River and Kawayi backwaters. On the west, at the seacoast, is situated the promontory of Ezhimala. The altitude of the Madayipara ranges from a minimum of 40 m to a maximum of 47m above sea level. The southeastern edge of the hill is slightly elevated compared to the remaining areas. As the name suggests, the top of this hillock is a laterite plain more than 365 ha in area. The ancient temple named Vadukunda Shiva temple is located on the western side of the plateau. A few yards away from the temple is a perennial freshwater pond, of about 1.5 acres is a major attraction. On the northeastern slope of the hill, is situated the Thiruvarkad Bhagavathi temple (Madayikavu) and its sacred grove, drawing thousands of devotees every year. It is a temple of the mother Goddess Kali and belongs to the royal family of Chirakkal.

The entire plateau once belonged to this temple, and even now the temple festival is being celebrated on the vast expanse of the hill near the Vadukunda pond and the Kottakunnu especially during the ten-day-long festival of ‘Pooram’ in the month of March. There are remnants of a fort believed to have been occupied by the dynasty of Kolathiris and later by Tippu Sultan. The Madayipalli, one of the oldest mosques in India and believed to have been built in A.D. 1124 by Malik lbn Dinar of Arabia, is situated on the eastern slope of the hill. Another monument of importance is the "Jew's pond" which indicates the presence in the area of Jews between 605 BCE and 490 CE. The British rulers had also built a traveler's bungalow in 1793 on the eastern side of the Madayipara, endowed with a rich scenic beauty of landscapes.

== Biodiversity of Madayipara ==
The Madayipara is well known for its rich diversity of plants. The aquatic and semi-aquatic plants form extensive carpets of blue, pink, white and yellow during the monsoon season. It is typical of the Laterite foothills of the Western Ghats. The area is notable for the presence of some of the rarest plants of the world such as Nymphoides krishankesara, Rotala malabarica, Lindernia madayiparense, Eriocaulon madayparense, etc.

The midland hillocks of northern Kerala have its own characteristic floral composition supporting scrub jungles and cashew plantations on the hill slopes and grasslands and associated aquatic and semi-aquatic plants on the hilltops. Even though these hills are exposed directly to the sunlight and wind, they harbour rich species diversity. Recent plant explorations revealed more additions to the known plant species of the area some of which turned out to be new to science, and endemic to the locality. The vegetation of the hillocks may be classified mainly into grasslands and scrub jungles. The grasslands can again be categorised into wet phase and dry phase grasslands based on the seasons. More than 500 plant species have been recorded from Madayipara.

The midland hillocks of northern Kerala have its own characteristic floral composition supporting scrub jungles and cashew plantations on the hill slopes and grasslands and associated aquatic and semi-aquatic plants on the hilltops. Even though these hills are exposed directly to the sunlight and wind, they harbour rich species diversity. Recent plant explorations revealed more additions to the known plant species of the area some of which turned out to be new to science, and endemic to the locality. The vegetation of the hillocks may be classified mainly into grasslands and scrub jungles. The grasslands can again be categorised into wet phase and dry phase grasslands based on the seasons.

== Grasslands ==
Grasslands of Kerala have been classified into two types i.e., Low elevation grasslands and high elevation grasslands. The grasslands on the laterite hills of north Malabar are classified under low elevation dry grasslands, characterised by remarkable diversity. This type of natural grassland is the characteristic feature of the laterite hills of Kozhikode, Kannur, Kasaragod districts and the lower parts of Wayanad district. These grasslands are highly seasonal and interspersed with other herbaceous plants and scrub jungles. More than 50 species of grasses were recorded from Madayipara hills, many more remaining to be fully identified. The common grass species are the Eragrostis uniloides, Ischaemum indicum, Heteropogon contortus, Pennisetum polystachyon, Cynodon dactylon and species belonging to the genera Arundinella, Dimeria, Panicum, Themeda, etc. Species of Arundinella form the commonest grasses during the months of October and November. The pinkish inflorescence of these grasses makes the area appear as if burnt mixed here and there with green shades. According to Agarwal (1961), Arundinella form a higher stage in the succession. So it can be safely stated that Arundinella grasses represent a higher stage in grassland development in the areas where they occur.

Recent plant explorations revealed some more new species of grasses from the laterite hills of north Malabar (Sreekumar and Nair, 1991), 11 out of 37 endemic grasses of Kerala are reported from this kind of locality. Thus, these hillocks are isolated ecological niches of conservation importance. However, a detailed account of the species association is lacking. Grasses control erosion, and several species are well known for their rich fodder value. When the monsoon recedes, the local people start cutting grasses for use as fodder for their cattle. A small plot, containing a thick growth of Themeda and other species of grasses fetches about rupees three thousand per season for a landowner.

== The wet phase ==
The first fall of southwest monsoon during late May or early June stimulates the germination of seeds and the growth of annual plants. The first groups of plants seen are Neanotis spp., Eriocaulon spp. and grasses, followed by insectivorous plants such as Utricularia spp. and Drosera indica that dominate the land. The deep blue flowers of Utricularia and white flower heads of Eriocaulon and Rhamphicarpa literally paint the whole plateau in shades of blue, violet and white, amidst herbaceous plants such as Sopubia trifida, Lindernia, Polygala elongata, Justicia japonica, Leucas sp. and several others. The shallow depressions filled with water accommodate plants such as Blyxa, Nymphoides krishnakesara, Marsilea minuta, Cryptocoryne spiralis, Rotala malampuzhensis, Rotala malabarica and lsoetes coromandelina. The sparsely distributed south Indian endemic Chamaesyce katrajensis (syn. Euphorbia katrajensis) can also be observed during this phase on the laterite rocks.

Following the retreat of southwest monsoon, during September, most of the early appearing plants give way to others such as Celosia argentea, Sesamum orientale and grasses such as Arundinella spp., Dimeria spp., Ischaemum indicum, Panicum spp., etc. which dominate subsequently. The abundance of grasses can be noticed during this period. The wet phase lasts up to the end of November.

== The dry phase ==
Stronger winds during the month of January and the direct incidence of sunlight enhance the drying up process of the flora of Madayipara. The majority of the herbaceous plants dry up except for some grass species and the thorny Lepidagathis keralaensis, which may remain spread all over the rocky regions of the hill. The silver coloured, Polycarpaea corymbosa can also be seen against the black surfaces of the rocks.

== Scrub jungles ==
The scrub jungles form the protective cover of the slopes of the hills. The thick grove adjacent to the clay mining site is one of the major vegetation patches of this hillock. The evergreen forest species such as Hydnocarpus pentandra, Holigrna arnottiana, Cinnamomum sp. are seen in this area. Ficus arnottiana one of the characteristic fig tree of this kind of ecosystem is seen in the southwestern part of the Plateau. The tree is locally called Kallarayal (Malayalam meaning - Peepal Tree of rocks). Other fig species such as Ficus benghalensis, Ficus religiosa, Ficus racemosa, Ficus tinctoria, Ficus exasperata and Ficus hispida also support large number of frugivorous birds and bats during their fruiting season. The small groves of Ixora coccinea, Ziziphus oenoplia, Ziziphus rugosa and thick clumps of Calycopteris flouribunda give refuge to a large number of small animals and birds in addition to providing nectar to butterflies and other insects during their flowering season. The forest dwelling species of Stereospermum colais is one of the major wonders of this woody area, with its large white flowers blooming during November and December. A large tree of Careya arborea situated in the compound of the tourist bungalow also support a large number of animals such as bats, birds, butterflies, etc.

== Rare and endangered plants ==
The geographical and climatical features made Madayipara and the adjacent laterite hillock system in supporting a unique assemblage of species. It is the home of some unique and sparsely distributed endemic plants such as Nymphoides krishnakesara (Joseph and Sivarajan, 1990), Rotala malabarica (Pradeep et al., 1990), Justicia ekakusuma (Pradeep et al., 1991), Lepidagathis keralensis (Madhusoodanan and Singh, 1992), Eriocaulon madayiparense, (Swapna et al., 2012), Lindernia madayiparense (Narayanan et al., 2012), Eriocaoulon cheemenianum Biju et al. (2012), Coelachene madayensis Pramod & Pradeep (2012), Parasopubia hofmannii Pradeep & Pramod (2012), P. hoffmanii var. albiflora Pradeep & Pramod (2012), Eriocaulon gopalakrishnanum Rashmi & Krishnakumar (2013), Fimbristylis pokkudaniana Sunil et al. (2016) and Chrysopogon narayaniae Sunil et al. (2017).

Nymphoides krishnakesara is a small water lilly appear during the wet phase in the small pools and ponds on the plateau. Rotala malabarica is a semi-aquatic plant seen largely in the temporary pools. Justicia ekakusuma (Pradeep et al., 1991), aptly named because of its nature of flower, is rare and seen in the rocky edges of the plateau. Lepidagathis keralensis (Madhusoodanan and Singh, 1992) described for the first time from this locality and flowers during the dry phase. It is observed that the number of Justicia ekakusuma has been declining drastically over the years, while other newly described species remain uniformly distributed. Eriocaulon madayiparense , grows in temporary pools or wet areas during the wet phase.

Chamaesyce katrajensis (which now includes Euphorbia katrajensis var. kasaragodensis), is an endemic species originally described from the similar habitats of Katraja hills of Maharashtra. The beautiful small yellowish to pinkish flowers of this species is seen during the wet phase. This plant is poorly distributed, and individuals of the species can be seen on the elevated portions of rocks. Only very few individuals of this species are found in Madayipara. Curuma oligantha is another characteristic plant seen in the laterite habitats during the wet phase. It now includes plants described by Ansari et al. (1982) as Curcuma cannanorensis var. cannanorensis and var. lutea. It is also known from parts of Southern India, Sri Lanka and Myanmar. It also appears immediately after the first shower of the monsoon. Besides, the abundance of insectivorous plants such as Drosera indica and Utricularia spp. are worth mentioning.

Out of 670 species known from the Madayippara (Pramod et al. 2017), more than 60 are Peninsular Indian endemics; of which 24 are narrow endemics of Kerala, confined to the laterite hillocks. Sevan species are Indian endemics and 28 species are known from confined to Peninsular Indian and Sri Lanka and 13 species to Indian region and Sri Lanka. The presence of endemic species belonging to various threat categories such as Hopea ponga, Capparis rheedei, Eriocaulon cuspidatum and Neanotis rheedei are also indicate the conservation significance of the area. Another interesting plant of this locality is the rare lycophyte, Isoetes coromandelina found near the temporary pools of Madayipara during the wet phase. It was once widely distributed in the wetlands and paddy fields of Kerala, but becoming rare due to changes in the habitats. Ophioglossum species such as O. costatum, O. nudicale and O. gramineum are also distributed sparsely and make their appearance during the wet phase.

The wet phase of the Laterite hillocks is the more active in terms of the appearance of plant and animals (Jafer Palot and Radhakrishnan, 2005). An analysis of the biological spectrum revels the fact that, majority of the herbaceous members appears along with the first showers, flourish during the monsoon season, complete their life cycle towards the end of the rainy season and enter into the dormant phase by shedding their fruits/seeds or in the form of rhizomes. The dry phase is characterized by the presence of highly adapted, xerophytic plants such as Lepidagathis, Chamaesyce, etc. They may remain fresh to some extent of the summer season, and may dry up leaving the perennial rootstock.

== Conservation ==
The laterite hillock system has been facing serious danger of degradation over the years. Most part of the midland hillocks had been converted to plantations, building sites, minimizing sites, etc. The indiscriminate mining for laterite and soil demolishing the hillocks had been severely threatened the very existence of the biota, culture and also the water availability in most of the areas. The Madayippara and its adjacent hillocks are also not an exception. The mining for the ‘china clay’ has been causing severe damage to the system. It was strongly limited due to the positive intervention by the general public to some extent. However, such operations are going on in other areas. There was a proposal to mine the entire hillock of Madayippara for the lignite deposits. However, it was not yet executed due to the heavy protest from the general public.

Majority of the general public is least bothered about its biodiversity. The Madayippara and its environs survived over these years, by supporting its rich cultural and ecological features. However, it is a matter of great concerns that, whether it could continue in preserving its feature, without getting urgent conservation measures. The rate of pollution is very high over these years. It includes wastes such as from the vehicles, dumping of all sorts of wastes from household garbage to plastic and industrial debris, etc. The visitors also contribute their share by dumping plastic, cans of drinks, bottles, etc.

The lack of awareness is the major reason for the pathetic condition of this type of unique ecosystem, which supports many endemic species. The local administrative bodies could do a lot in conserving this system. Adopting conservation practices such as bringing it under the protection of a community reserve only could save the Madayippara and its environs from degradation. In addition to its high scenic beauty and ecological values, its historical significance and rich cultural heritage also make it an ideal site to be conserved for the future.

== Transportation ==
The national highway passes through Taliparamba town. Goa and Mumbai can be accessed on the northern side and Cochin and Thiruvananthapuram can be accessed on the southern side. The road to the east of Iritty connects to Mysore and Bangalore. The nearest railway station is Pazhayangadi on Mangalore-Palakkad line. Trains are available to almost all parts of India subject to advance booking over the internet. Nearest airport is Kannur.

== See also ==
- An updated checklist of flowering plants of Madayipara, Kannur district, Kerala. Malabar Trogon 15 (1&2), Jan-Aug 2017, pp. 14–34.
- Observations on the Flora of Madayipara: published in Malabar Trogon 8(2&3) pp. 14-29
- Eriocaulon madayiparense (Eriocaulaceae) – A new species from the foot hills of the Western Ghats of India. PhytoKeys 10 (2012) : 19-23. doi: 10.3897/phytokeys.10.2297.
- Madayi Kavu
- Payangadi
- Tippu Sultan
- Malik Ibn Dinar
- Kannur
