= Theyyam =

Ritual form of worship by Hindus from Kerala

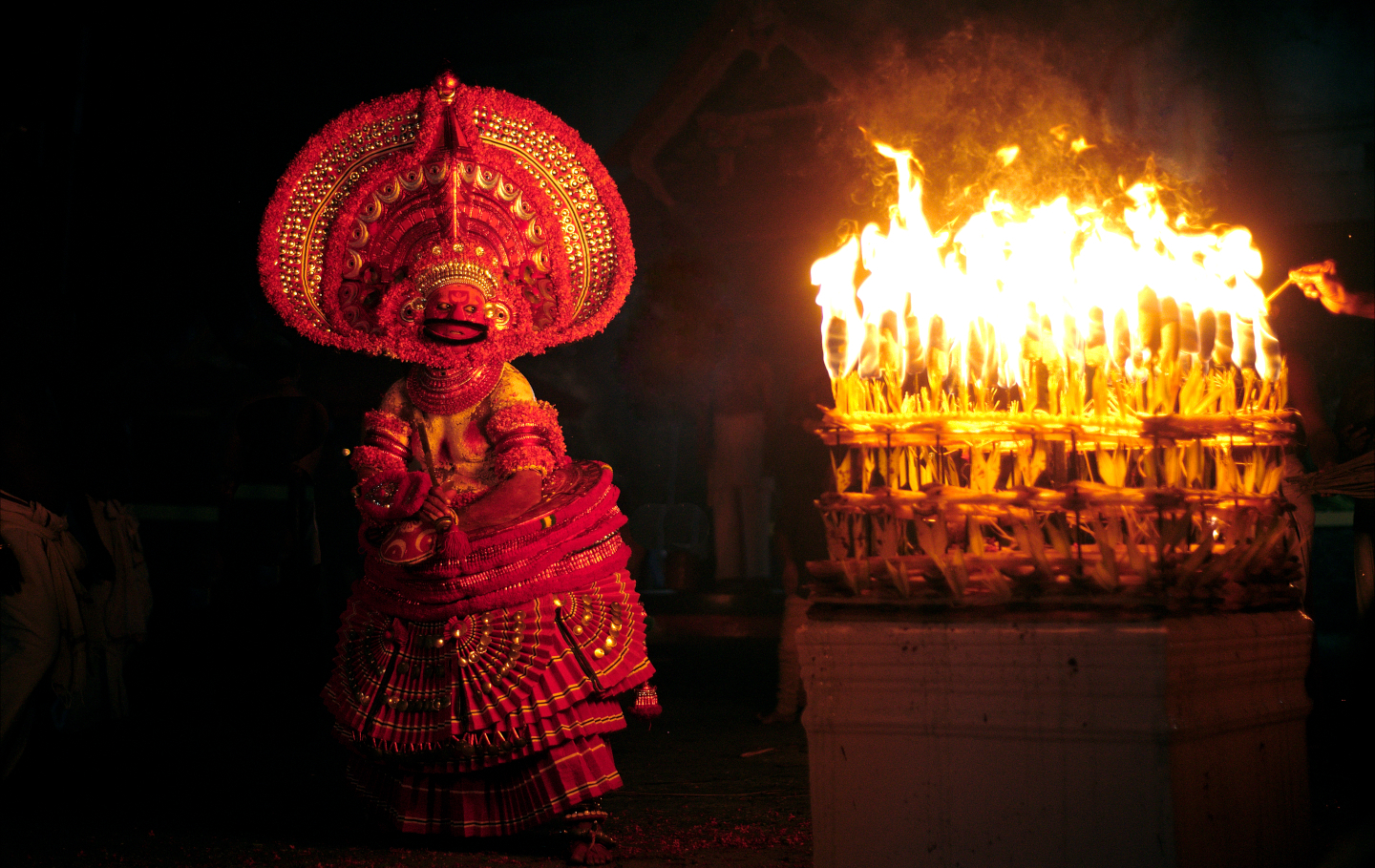
Kathivanoor Veeran

Theyyam also known as Kaliyattam, is an Indian ritual practiced in the North Malabar Region of Kerala and some parts of neighbouring Karnataka.

It involves extended singing of ritual songs related to the performing Theyyam and ceremonial preparations that typically span 8 to 10 hours. The ritual culminates with the placement of the mudi (sacred headgear) on the performer, a moment believed to mark the entry of the deity into the performer's body. As part of the process, the performer consumes madhyam (toddy), which is believed to suppress personal consciousness, allowing the divine consciousness of the devatha to manifest. This practice aligns with philosophical concepts found in Hindu texts such as the Yoga Vasistha, which describe how divine entities (devatas) can enter the human body, parakāya praveśanam at a Paramanu level.

Theyyam consists of traditions, rituals and customs associated with temples and sacred groves of Malabar. The people of the region consider Theyyam itself as a channel to a god and they thus seek blessings from Theyyam. In Kerala, Theyyam is performed predominantly in the North Malabar region (consisting of present-day Kasargod, Kannur districts, Mananthavady Taluk Of Wayanad And Vadakara And Koyilandy taluks of Kozhikode). A similar custom known as Bhuta Kola is followed in the Tulunadu area of the neighbouring Karnataka.

Theyyam rituals are performed by people of various castes, including the Thiyyar, who are responsible for the Kalasham submission, and the Malayar and Vannan communities, who perform the Theyyam. The Thiyyars traditionally hold the right to cancel any Theyyam performance if needed. Castes that adopted Brahmanical customs and acquired revenue titles have historically had no role in Theyyam, as they relinquished their kulam (lineage) and kulacharam (ritual practices) upon integrating into the Brahmanical fold, often in service of Vedic Brahmins. Female members of these castes are traditionally not permitted to enter the sacred space through the front entrance (thirumuttam) and must instead use the rear entrance.

Theyyam season starts on the tenth day of the Malayalam month of Thulam (usually during October in the Gregorian calendar, and is known as paththaam-udayam) and lasts up to seven months until the middle of Edavam month (typically late May and June). The last Kaliyaattam for the season is performed at Madayi Kavu and Kalarivathukkal Bhagavathy Temple, both being the family shrines of Kolathiri royal family.

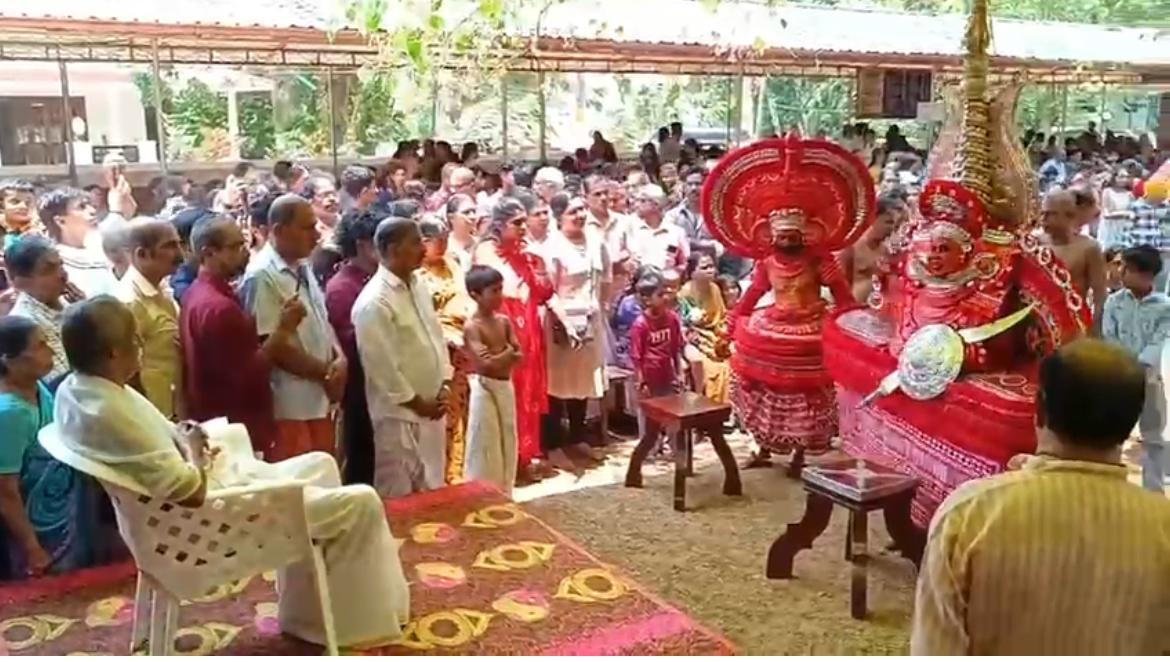
Remnants of the feudal Koyma or Melayi system in Theyyam, where Kaikolar, spittoon holders for Brahmin lords, monitored other castes. Now mostly abolished as younger generations barred them from their kavus, though still seen in parts of Kasaragod

== Overview ==
There are about 456 types of Theyyams documented. Theyyam is mainly performed by males, except the Devakkoothu theyyam which is performed by women. Devakoothu is performed only in the Thekkumbad Kulom temple.

Theyyam is typically performed by people from castes and tribes like Pulayar, Vannan, Malayan, Anhoottan, Munnoottan, Mavilan, Koppalan, Velan, Chingathan, Kalanaadi, Paravan, and Nalikeyavar. Of these, Kalanaadi people perform only in Wayanad district, while Parava, Pambada, Paanaara and Nalikeyavar perform in places north of Kerala, Mangalapuram (Mangalore) and Udupi districts.

== History ==
Documentary on Theyyam

Theyyam has a long history. "There can be no doubt," say Bridget and Raymond Alchin, "that a very large part of this modern folk religion is extremely ancient and contains traits which originated during the earliest periods of Neolithic, Chalcolithic settlement and expression."

There are approximately 400 types of Theyyam, including Kathivanoor Veeran, Vishnumoorthy Theyyam, Vettakkorumakan and Sree Muthappan.

Theyyam may have its origins in ancestor worship. It has been observed that a vast majority of the Theyyam deities have their origin in Thiyya castes. The ancestor worship ritual was evolved into the elaborate dance ritual, that is seen nowadays, by incorporating many other local beliefs.

== Classification of sub-sects ==
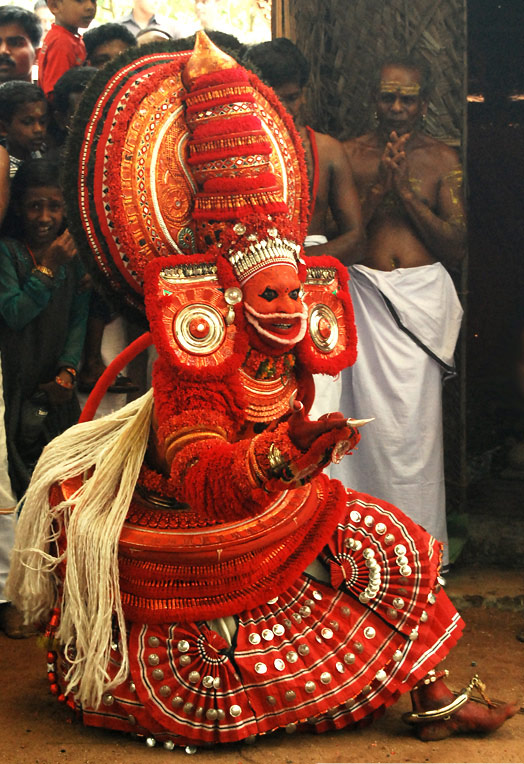
Bali Theyyam at Payyannur

According to K. K. N. Kurup, it can be said that all the prominent characteristics of primitive, tribal, religious worship had widened the stream of Theyyam, where "even the followers of Islam are associated with the cult in its functional aspect" and made it a deep-rooted folk religion of millions. For instance, Bhagavathi, the mother goddesses had and still has an important place in Theyyam. Besides this, practices like spirit worship, ancestor worship, hero-worship, masathi-worship, tree worship, animal worship, serpent worship, the worship of the goddesses of disease and the worship of Gramadevata (Village-Deity) are included in the mainstream of the Theyyam. Along with these gods and goddesses there exist innumerable folk gods and goddesses. Most of these goddesses are known as Bhagavathy.

Different branches of mainstream Hindu religion such as Shaktism, Vaishnavism and Shaivism now dominate Theyyam. However, the forms of propitiation and other rituals are continuations of a very ancient tradition. In several cult-centres, blood offering is seen, which is forbidden in Buddhism and Jainism. In such centres, separate places outside the precincts of the shrine are selected for blood offerings and for the preparation of the traditional Kalam (square made for this sacrifice occasion) known as Vadakkan Vathil. The Theyyam deities propitiated through cock-sacrifice will not enter such shrines. This religious cockfight over blood sacrifice, which does also include the cockfight as a blood sacrifice, is a prime example of "cultural synthesis of 'little' and 'great' cultures".

On account of the late revival of the Vaishnavism movement in Kerala, it does not have a deep impact on Theyyam. Only a few deities are available under this category. Two major Theyyam deities of Vaishnavism are Vishnumoorthi and Daivathar. Vaishnavism was very popular in the Tuluva region in the 13th century when it came under the rule of Vishnuvardhana of the Hoysala dynasty. He was a great champion of Vaishnavism. Most probably he was initially deified as Vishnumoorthi and incorporated into the Bhoota cult of the Tuluvas and then further incorporated as a prominent folk deity into the Theyyam as well. To some, the legend of Vishnumoorthi is symbolizes the god's migration from Mangalore to Kolathunadu.

All other categories of Theyyam deities can be classified under Shaivism or Shaktism. Even spirits, ancestors, heroes, and animals are deified and included in those categories. Briefly, Theyyam provides a good example for the religious evolution of, and the subsequent different stages in modern Hinduism, with the overall understanding that within Hindu syncretism lay propitiation as ancient practices and rituals of ancient worship intended for the blessings of the supernatural not unlike, "in Indus Valley and other ancient civilizations, mother goddess had been invoked for fertility and prosperity".

== Patronage ==
Out of devotion, ruling clans established their own shrines and Kavus for Theyyam deities where non-sattvic rituals and customs are observed. The goddesses like Rakteshwari, Chamundi, Someshwari, Kurathi, and the gods like Vishnumoorthi are propitiated in these household shrines. There, the Theyyam dancers appear during the annual festivals of gods and goddesses. The rituals in such shrines are different from those of the Brahmanical temples. This fusion in the later stage is an indication of the gradual introduction of civilization into Southern India with increasing Aryan influence and assimilation of local cultures into the large Vedic religion.

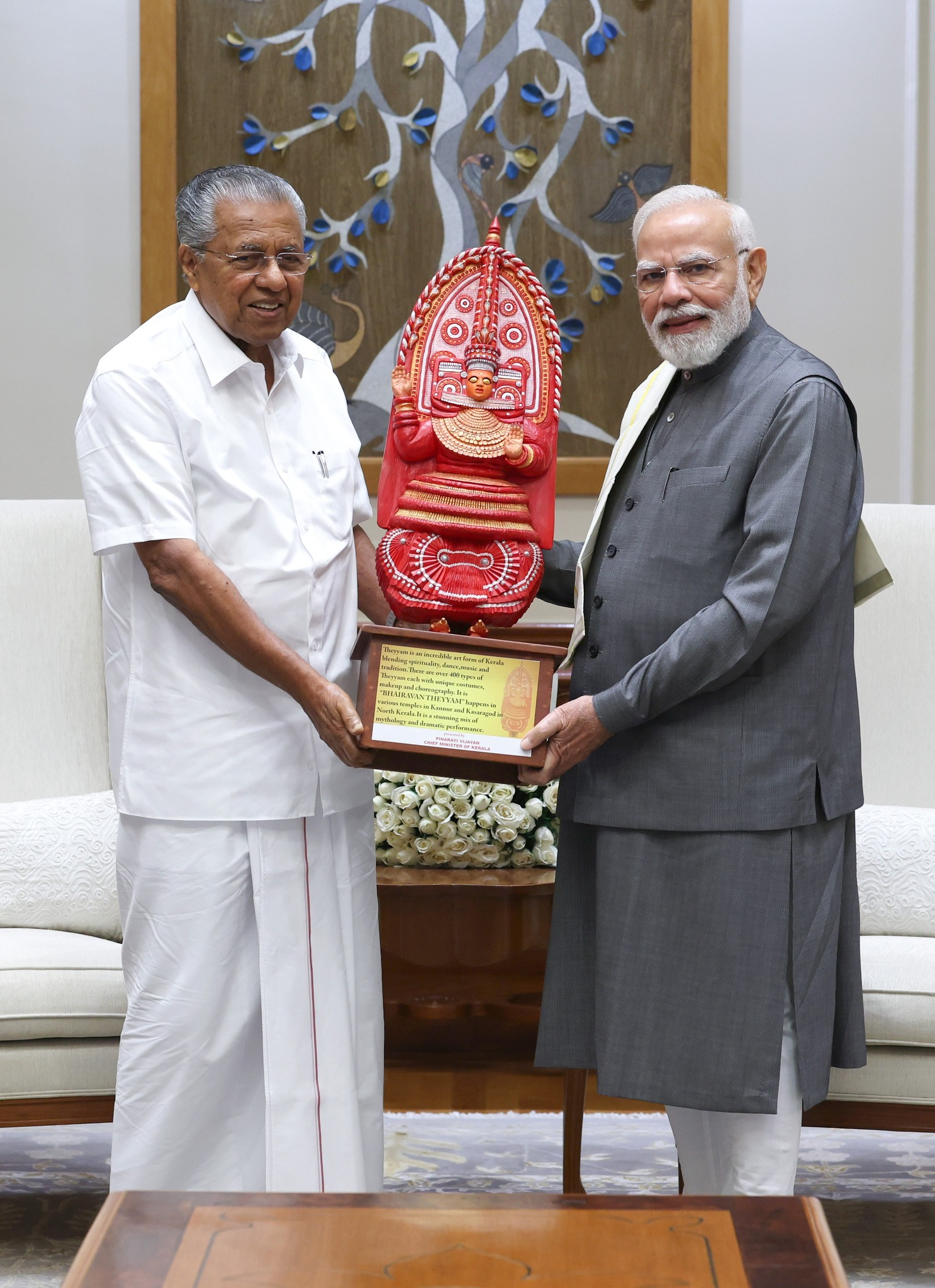
Chief Minister of Kerala, Shri Pinarayi Vijayan, presenting a Bhairavan Theyyam memento to Prime Minister Narendra Modi

== Ritual performance ==
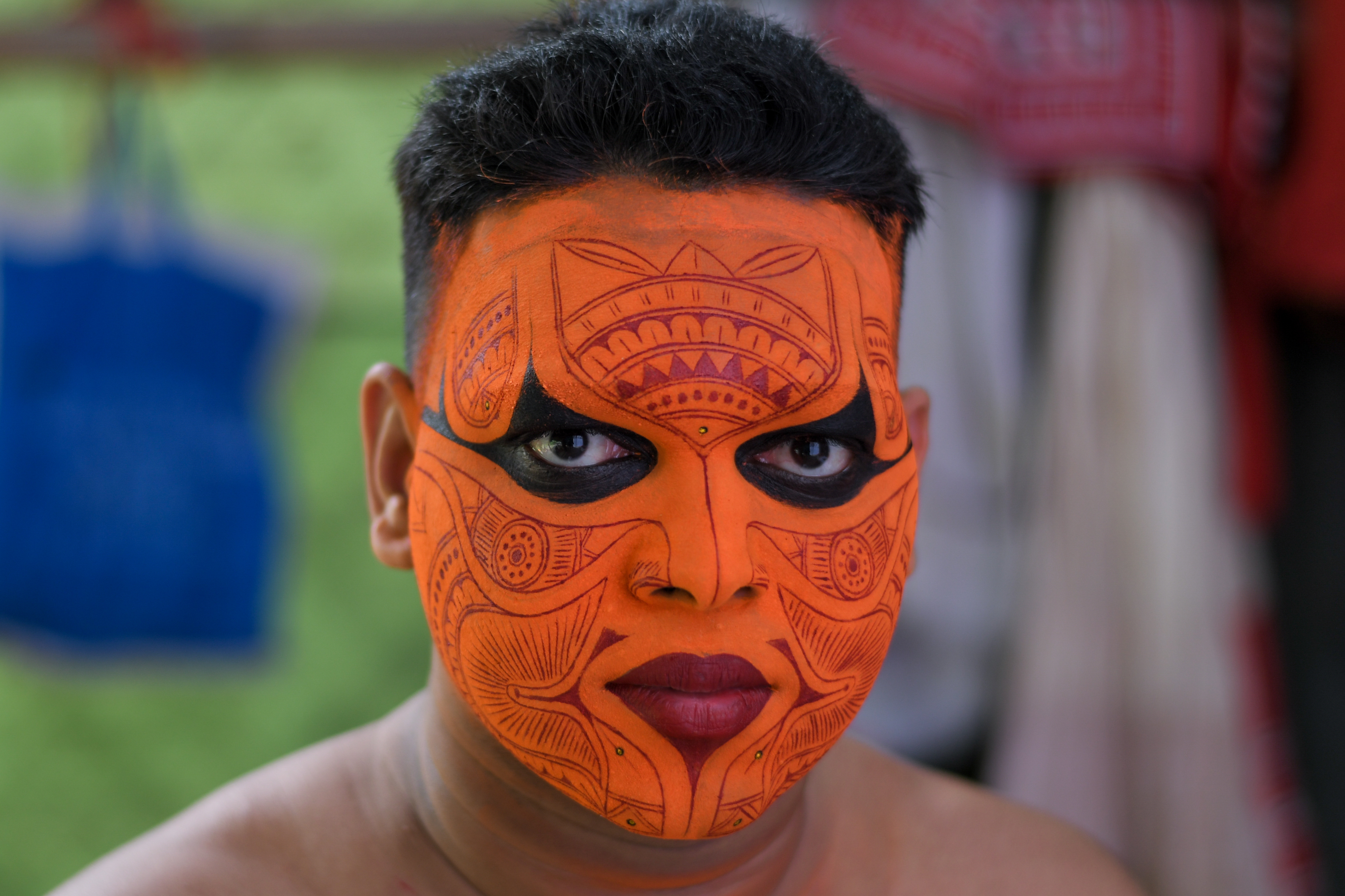
Face art of Theyyam is one of the best examples of folk painting in Kerala.

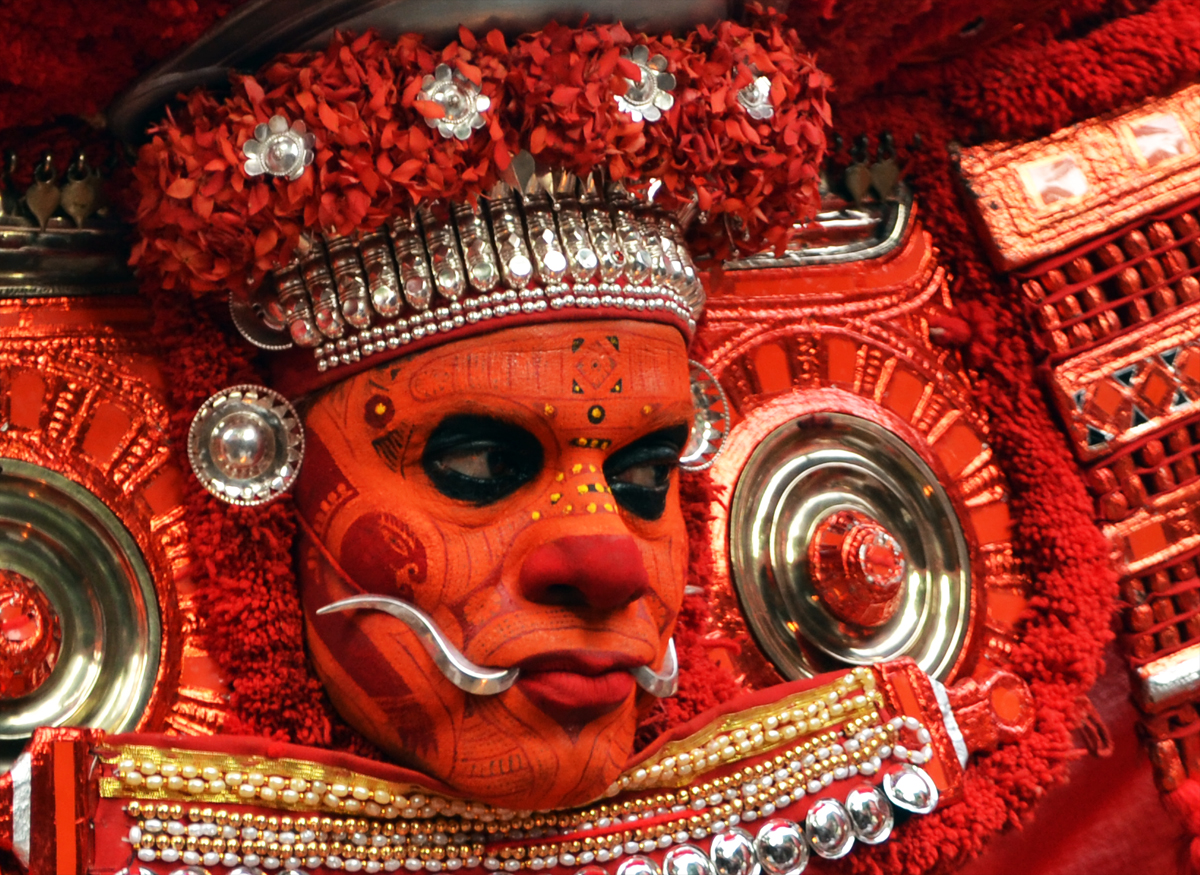
Puliyoor Kali Theyyam

The dance or invocation is generally performed in front of the village shrine. It is also performed in the houses as ancestor-worship with elaborate rites and rituals.

There is no stage or curtain or other such arrangements for the performance. The devotees would be standing or some of them would be sitting on a sacred tree in front of the shrine. In short, it is an open theatre. Performance of a particular deity according to its significance and hierarchy in the shrine continues for 12 to 24 hours with intervals. The chief dancer who propitiates the central deity of the shrine has to reside in the rituals. Further, after the sun sets, this particular dancer would not eat anything for the remainder of that day. His make-up is done by specialists and other dancers. The first part of the performance is usually known as Vellattam or Thottam. It is performed without proper make-up or any decorative costume. Only a small, red headdress is worn on this occasion.

The dancer along with the drummers recites the particular ritual song, which describes the myths and legends, of the deity of the shrine or the folk deity to be propitiated. This is accompanied by the playing of folk musical instruments. After finishing this primary ritualistic part of the invocation, the dancer returns to the green room. Again after a short interval, he appears with proper make-up and costumes. There are different patterns of face painting. Some of these patterns are called vairadelam, kattaram, kozhipuspam, kottumpurikam, and prakkezhuthu. Mostly primary and secondary colours are applied with contrast for face painting. It helps in effecting certain stylization in the dances. Then the dancer comes in front of the shrine and gradually "metamorphoses" into the particular deity of the shrine. The performance signifies the transitional inversion, reversal, and elevation of status denoting the anti-structural homogeneity of Theyyam. He, after observation of certain rituals places the head-dress on his head and starts dancing. In the background, folk musical instruments like chenda, tudi, kuzhal and veekni are played in a certain rhythm. All the dancers take a shield and kadthala (sword) in their hands as continuation of the weapons. Then the dancer circumambulates the shrine, runs in the courtyard and continues dancing there. The Theyyam dance has different steps known as Kalaasams. Each Kalaasam is repeated systematically from the first to the eighth step of footwork. A performance is a combination of playing of musical instruments, vocal recitations, dance, and peculiar makeup (usually predominantly orange) and costumes.

== Types of Theyyam ==
There are more than 400 types of Theyyam, 112 of which are famous. Some of the famous Theyyams Are:

=== Kathivanoor Veeran ===
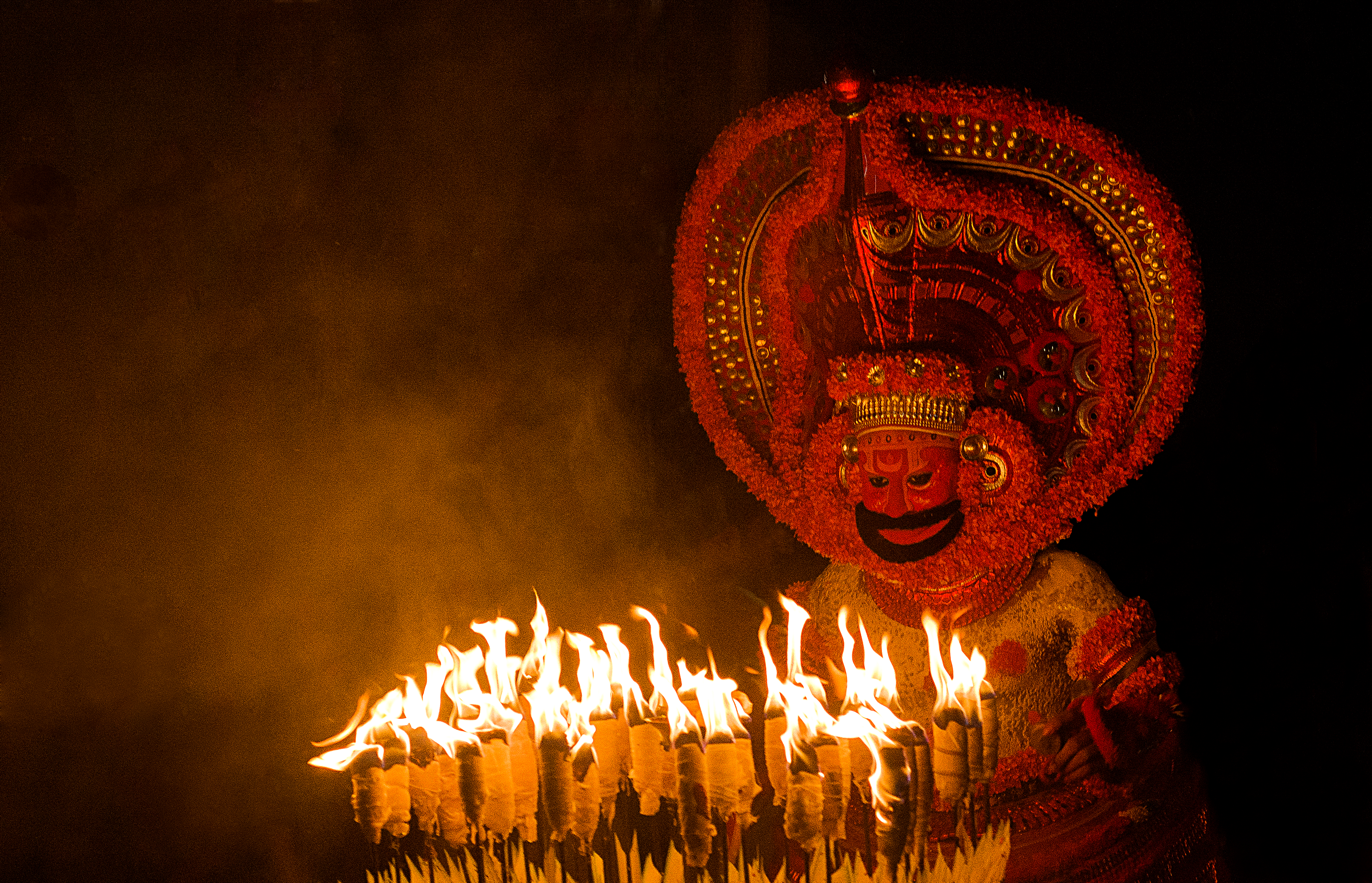

The Kathivanoor Veeran theyyam is performed in the memory of the great Thiyya community warrior Mandhappan Chekavar.

=== Muchilot Bhagavathi ===
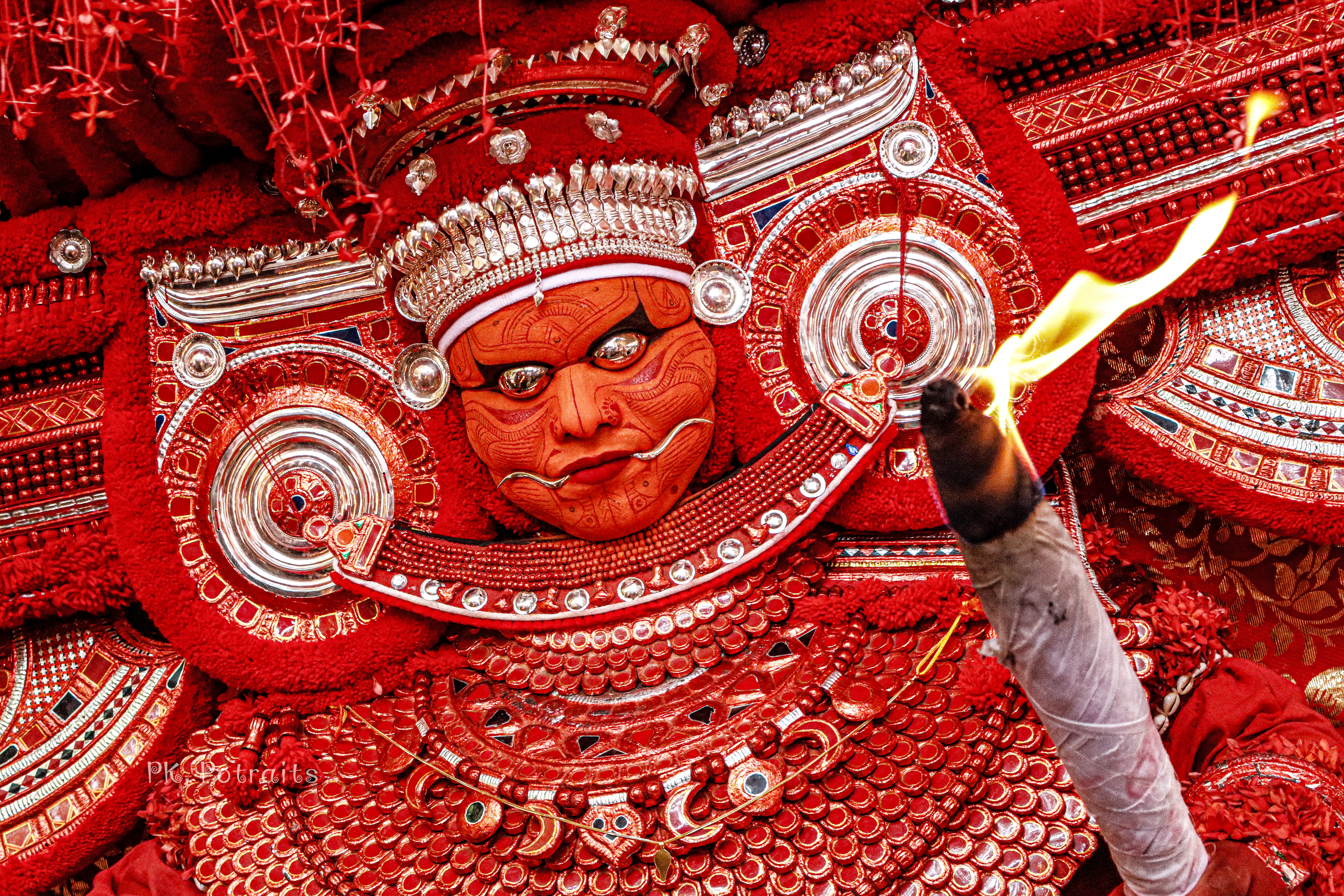

Muchilot Bhagavathi is a virgin goddess and the tutelary deity of the Vaniyas of North Malabar. According to local legend, she was a Brahmin woman born in the mana called Maniyottu in the village of Peringellur, near Taliparamba and elevated to the status of a deity. According to a holy manuscript (Pattola), Muchilot Bhagavathi is the Kali Yuga avatar of the goddesses Sita of the Treta Yuga, Maya of the Dvapara Yuga, and Gayatri, who appeared before Sage Vishvamitra. While travelling on Earth, she is believed to have rested at the home of Muchilot Pada Nair, who was a soldier belonging to the Muchilot clan among vāṇiyas.

=== Muthappan ===
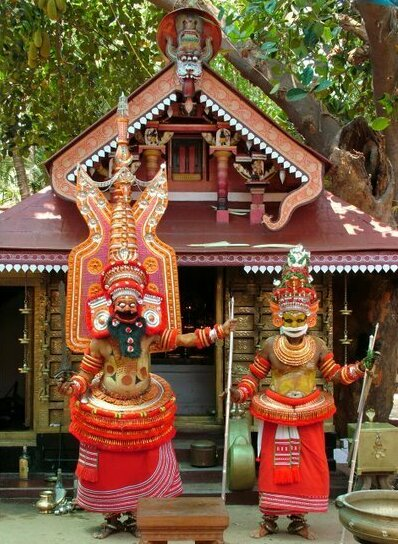
Thiruvappana or Valiya Muttapan (Vishnu) on left and the Vellatom or Cheriya Muttapan (Shiva) on right

Muthappan theyyam consists of two divine figures and is considered as the personification of two divine figures – the Thiruvappana or Valiya Muttapan (Vishnu) and the Vellatom or Cheriya Muttapan (Shiva). Muthappan Theyyam is different from other theyyams as it is performed all around the year. Muthappan Anthithira is another theyyam dedicated to Muthapan. The uniqueness of it is that it is performed only once in all the Muthapan temples.

=== Kandanar Kelan ===
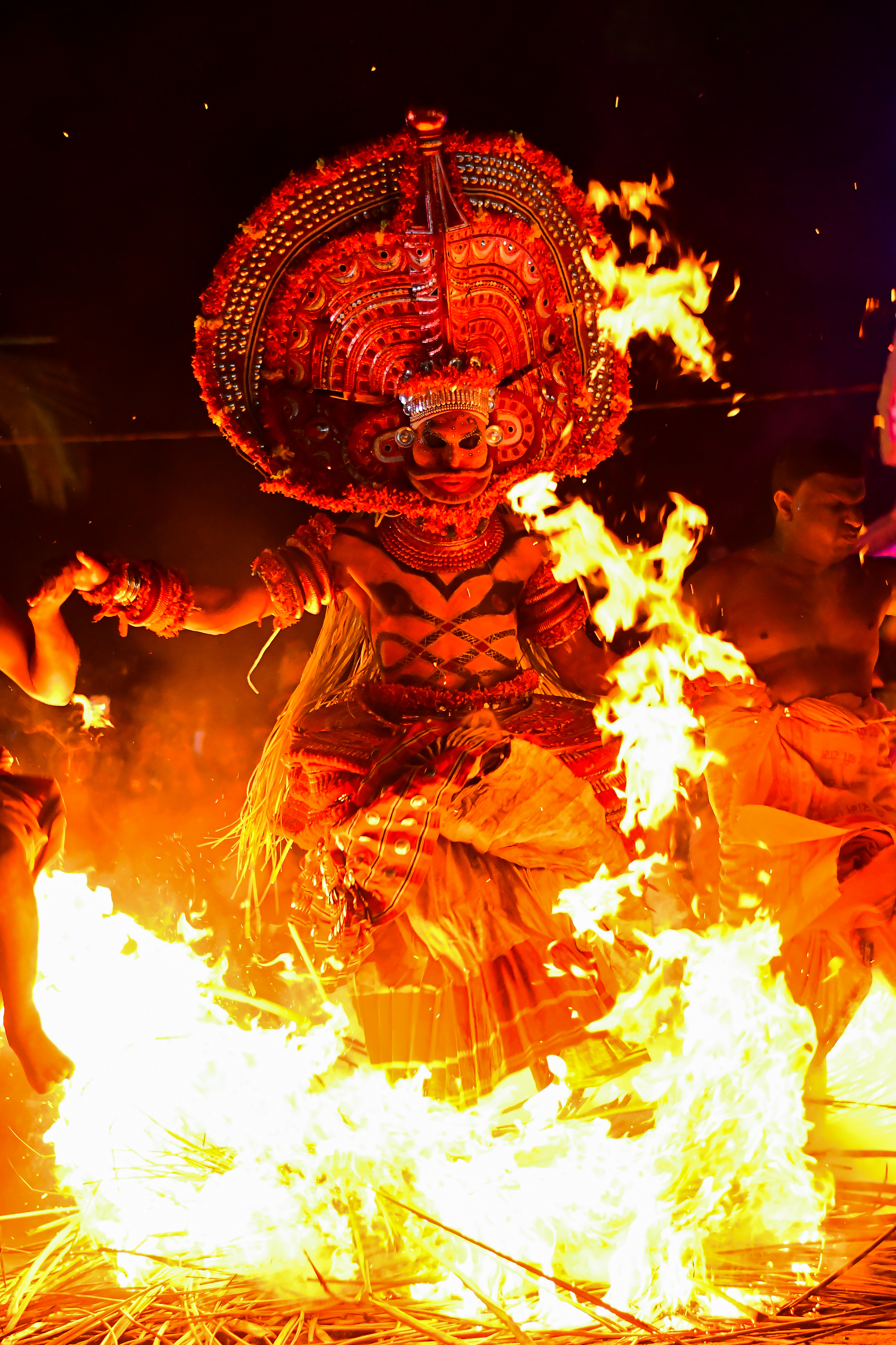
Kandanar Kelan Theyyam

Kandanar Kelan Theyyam is a Theyyam mainly performed in the Payyannur and Taliparamba areas.

=== Vishnumoorthi ===
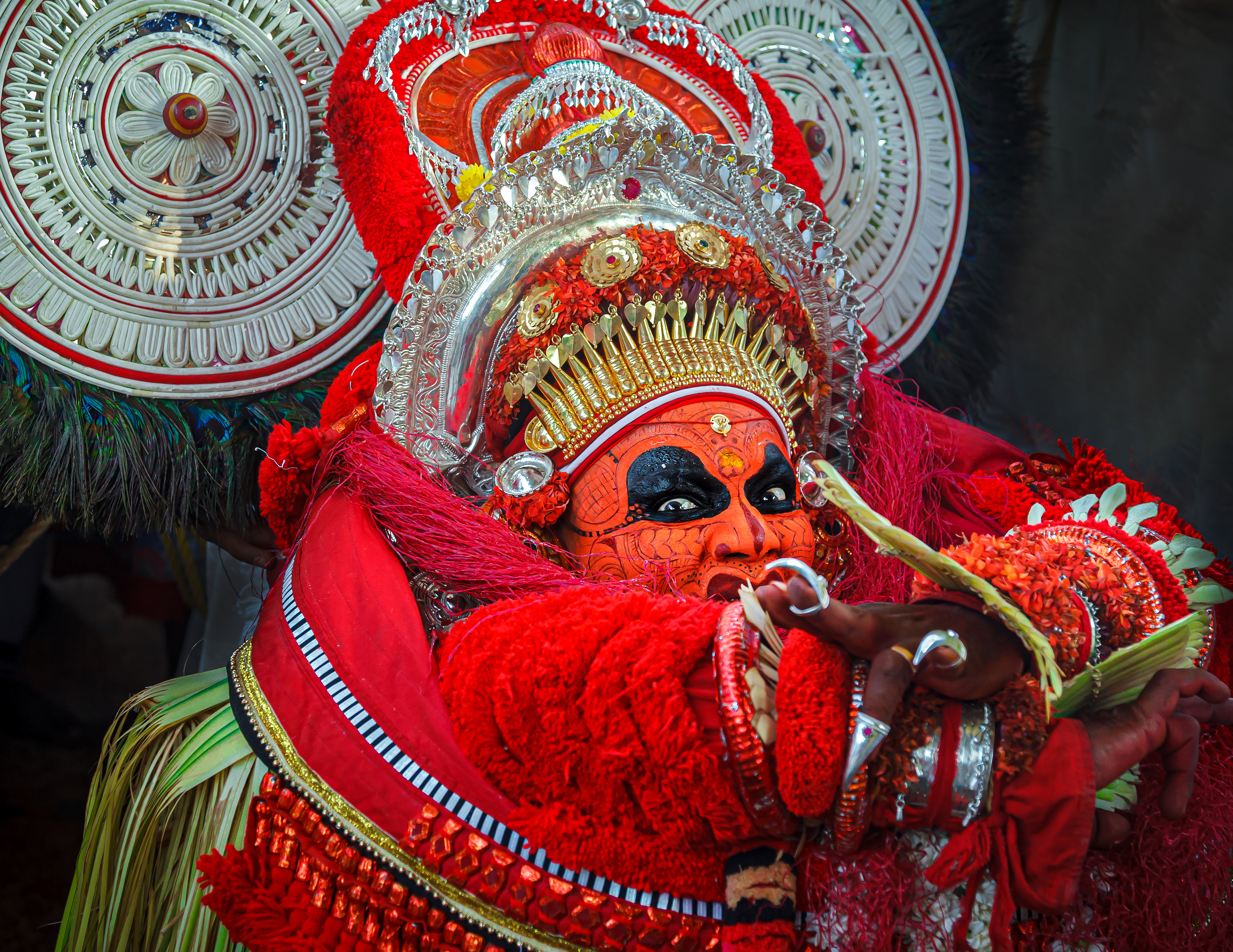
Vishnumoorthy Theyyam

This is the most popular Vaishnava Theyyam. This theyyam narrates and performs the story of Hiranyakashipu's death by Vishnu in his avatar of Narasimha. Because of this, Vishnumoorthi is also called Narasimhamoorthi.

=== Puthiya Bhagavathi ===
Puthya Bhagavathi' is a Theyyam performed in North Malabar and is also known as Puthya Bhagavathi'Puthyayotra (Puthya Bhagavathi Thira). Cheerumba Bhagavathi is considered to be the younger sister of Puthya Bhagavathi. Sri Bhadrakali herself is generally considered to be Puthya Bhagavathi.

=== Gulikan ===
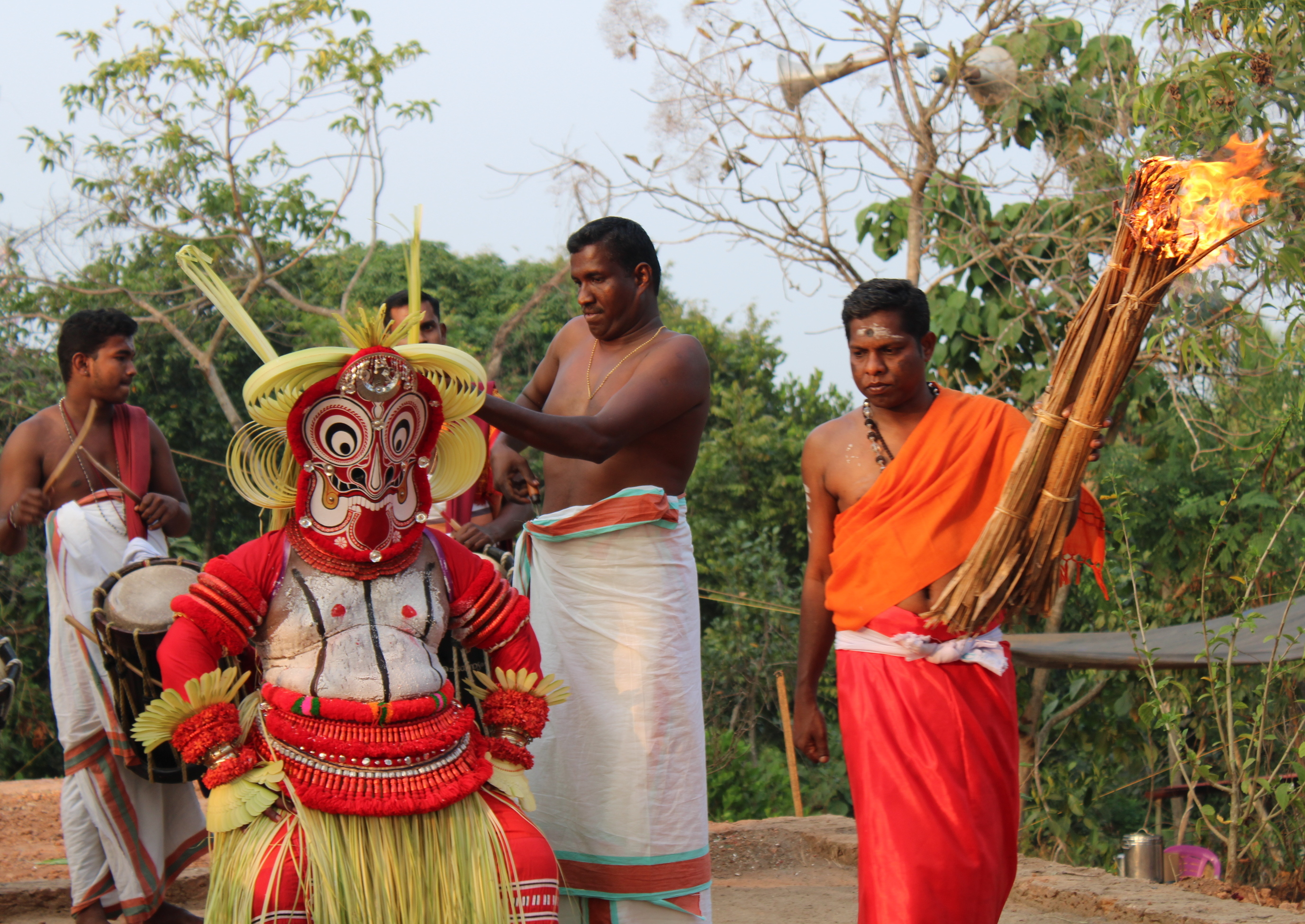
Gulikan Theyyam

Gulikan represents Yama, the Hindu god of death. The Benkanakavu (Venganakavu) in Nileshwar is the most famous temple dedicated to Gulikan.

=== Kuttichathan ===
Kuttichathan is a famous theyyam. The theyyam is associated with the Brahmin Family of Kalakatt Illam situated in Payyannur. It is believed that Kalakattachan, angry on him being a threat to his respect in the society, tore Kuttichathan into 396 pieces. There emerged 396 Chathans from the torn pieces and set the Nambudiri's house to fire, and burnt nearby Brahmin houses. It is claimed that Kuttichathan can grant any wish if the devotee prays to him with faith.

=== Chamundi ===
Chamundi theyyam is majorly of three types, namely Madayil Chamundi, Rakta Chamundi, and Kundorra Chamundi.

=== Madayil Chamundi ===
Chamundi is identified with Kali, who slew the asuras Chanda and Munda and drank the blood of the asura Raktabija, without letting a drop fall to the ground. Chamundi is also known as Rakta Chamundi (Blood Chamundi) and Rakteshvari (Goddess of blood) because she is immersed in blood. It is said that in the battle with the asuras, Kali followed them to the underworld to resume the fight. This form is called Patalamurti and Madayil Chamundi because she travelled to the underworld.

=== Kundora Chamundi ===
also known by the names Kundadi Chamundi and Kundoor Chamundi, is believed to be a fierce manifestation of Goddess Kali, who slew the demon Darikasura. This Theyyam is traditionally performed by the Velan community. The goddess is revered both as a village guardian deity (Naattu Paradevatha) and a household deity (Veettu Paradevatha). This theyyam was built by Velanmar.

She is considered part of the group of warrior goddesses. According to legend, during the great Deva-Asura war, the goddess took on many forms to vanquish the demons. One of these significant manifestations was Goddess Kaushiki, and Kundora Chamundi is believed to be a partial incarnation (Amsha Avataram) of Kaushiki, embodying the fierce aspect of Chamundi Devi.

It is said that Kundora Chamundi is none other than the form of Kali who defeated Darikasura. Before confronting Darika in battle, the goddess, disguised as a beggar woman, tricked Darika's wife, Kalakeyi, and her daughters into revealing a secret threefold mantra. Mounted on a Vetala (spirit), the goddess engaged in a fierce battle with Darika for seven days and nights. On the eighth day, she pinned the demon onto the Vetala's extended tongue, seized him by the hair, and finally slew him by slashing his throat – marking her ultimate triumph over evil.

=== Puthiyaramban ===
Puthiyaramban is regarded to have been the greatest warrior of the region called Allada Swaroopam, possessing supernatural power as well as knowledge and skill in kalari (a regional martial art). After a great victory, he is believed to have been betrayed in Nanummel Kali (Kalari). He was posthumously deified. Puthiyaramban Theyyam is performed in Puthiyaramban Tharavadu, Sree Kappattu Kazhagam, Sree Kannamangalam Kazhagam and Udinoor kulom.

== See also ==
- Places Of Worship Kannur
- Temples Of Kerala
- Thirayattam
- Padayani
- Utsavam
- Buta Kola
- Ritual
- Pooram
- Thottam Pattu
