= Devakkoothu =

Indian folk dance

- Native name: ദേവക്കൂത്ത്
- Genre: Ritual dance
- Origin: Kerala, India

Valliyamma
- Affiliation: Hinduism
- Region: North Malabar, Kerala, India

Devakkoothu also spelled as Devakoothu is a ritualistic dance performed in Kerala, India. It is the only theyyam performed by a woman. This theyyam is performed in the temple Tekumpad Koolom Thayakav near Cherukunnu in Kannur district. The goddess associated with Devakkoothu is called Valliyamma because she stayed at a forest of creepers, according to myths. Devakkoothu is performed once in two years.

== Overview ==
Devakkoothu is a theyyam performed in the temple Tekumpad Koolom Thayakav near Cherukunnu in Kannur district of Kerala. Even the Theyyams of female deities are generally performed by men, Devakkoothu is the only theyyam performed by a woman. The entire performance is based on the narration of the myth related to the goddess who lost in the creepers. Devakkoothu is performed once in two years, on fifth day of Malayalam month of Dhanu (December).

== Myth ==
One day, while traveling through the Devaloka, a group of goddess saw a place on earth full of beautiful flowers among creepers. They left the Devaloka to pick those flowers from that jungle-like place full of creepers and intoxicatingly fragrant flowers. They picked them all together and walked there merrily. Meanwhile, a goddess lost inside the creepers. Without knowing this, others returned to the Devaloka. The goddess was in a difficult situation, not knowing what to do. Then the villager who came there, rescued her from among the vines, and kept in a hut safely.

The goddess did not even have a change of clothes and cried and prayed to Narada, and hearing this prayer, he came with kohl, a mirror and dress for her, and took the deity first to Tayakav and then to Koolom. It is said that a temporary pandal was made in Koolom with coconut leaves and the deity changed her clothes from there, then crossed the Thekkumpad river in a canoe and reached the Ayiram theng Valluvan river shore, and from there went back to the Devaloka.

But even after returning to the Deva world, those green land, humans and safe experiences of the earth remained in Valliyamma's memory. So she decided to go down to the earth and meet the people every alternate year. Once in two years on the 5th of Dhanu month, Valliamma returns to the island to meet and bless people. This is the myth behind Devakkoothu.

== Theyyam ==
The theyyam of goddess is called Valliyamma because she stayed at a forest of creepers (Valli in Malayalam). Another character in the theyyam performance is Narada. Only non-menstruating women have the right to perform the role of Valliyamma in Devakkoothu. After observing Vrata for 41 days, The woman who perform leaves her house to temple. The Vratas are as mentioned in the basic ritual text named 'Pallimala'. It include vegetarian food and staying in the puja room for 41 days chanting sacred books.

Though theyam is on Dhanu 5th, the woman who perform will leave home on Dhanu 3rd along with her female entourage. during this journey she carries Pallimala, the main text of the Devakkoothu, and a plate filled with rice and flowers. This journey is to Valluvan river shore. The temple authorities will be waiting there with a raft. The raft is made by tying two boats together and spreading planks. This journey is to the ancestral home of Valluvakurup. There flowers will be sprinkled on the way to home, to welcome her. At night she will be taken to the temple accompanied by thalappoli and musical instruments.

A 'koochil' (a pandal) is made of coconut leaves in the temple. In the puja room prepared inside that pandal, she should stay till the day of Devakoothu with prayers. On Dhanu fifth, she wakes up early in the morning at five o'clock and after the spiritual rituals, the facial makeup begins. After makeup and costumes, accompanied by a soft chenda rhythm, the Valliyamma performer arrives to performing area hiding herself behind a red curtain held by two women.

Valliamma has all the amenities for normal theyyams. Valliamma's main costumes are a turban with 21 stones on the head, a cap, ghungroo and padasaram. There will be face art.

When the performer reaches the stage, she will first sing songs to praises of Lord Ganesha. Then she step with the rhythmic song. All stories from the myth, including picking flowers from the garden with the friends and lost inside the creepers will be beautifully acted. Finally, Narada will enter the arena with new clothes. After the Theyyam, rice is served as Prasada to the devotees.

== History ==
The Devakkoothu is believed to be as old as the Chirakkal dynasty. It was dormant for a long time but was revived in 1985–86.

Before 2012, this Theyyam was performed for 14 years by Lakshmi Amma, wife of Matai Kelu Panikar and since 2012, it is performed by K.P. Ambujakshi.
