= Thottam Pattu =

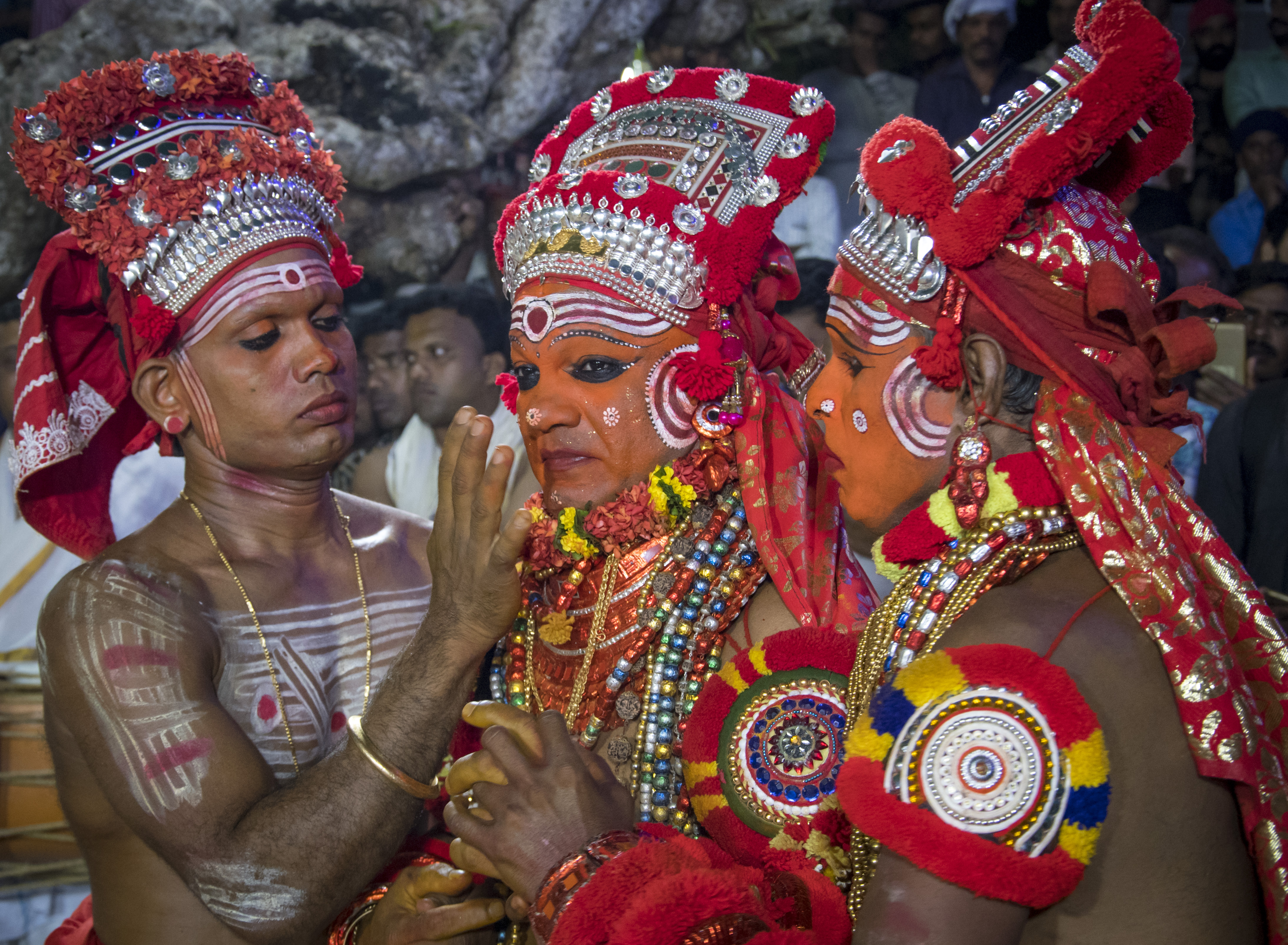
Kadavaankott Maakkam Tottam is one among the famous Thottam in north Kerala

Thottam Pattu (Malayalam: തോറ്റം പാട്ട്) is a ballad sung just before performing the Theyyam ritual. These are played in Theyyam temples before the commencement of Theyyam Art. Thottam Pattu is invocative. This is a mythological belief that by performing this ritual, the performer will be possessed by divine spirits. Thottam Pattu, the ritualistic songs which accompany the performance elaborate the legends related to the deities. Percussions such as Chenda and Thudi accompany the songs. Usually drummer men or make-up men or both of them perform the Thottam pattu by singing during the make-up.

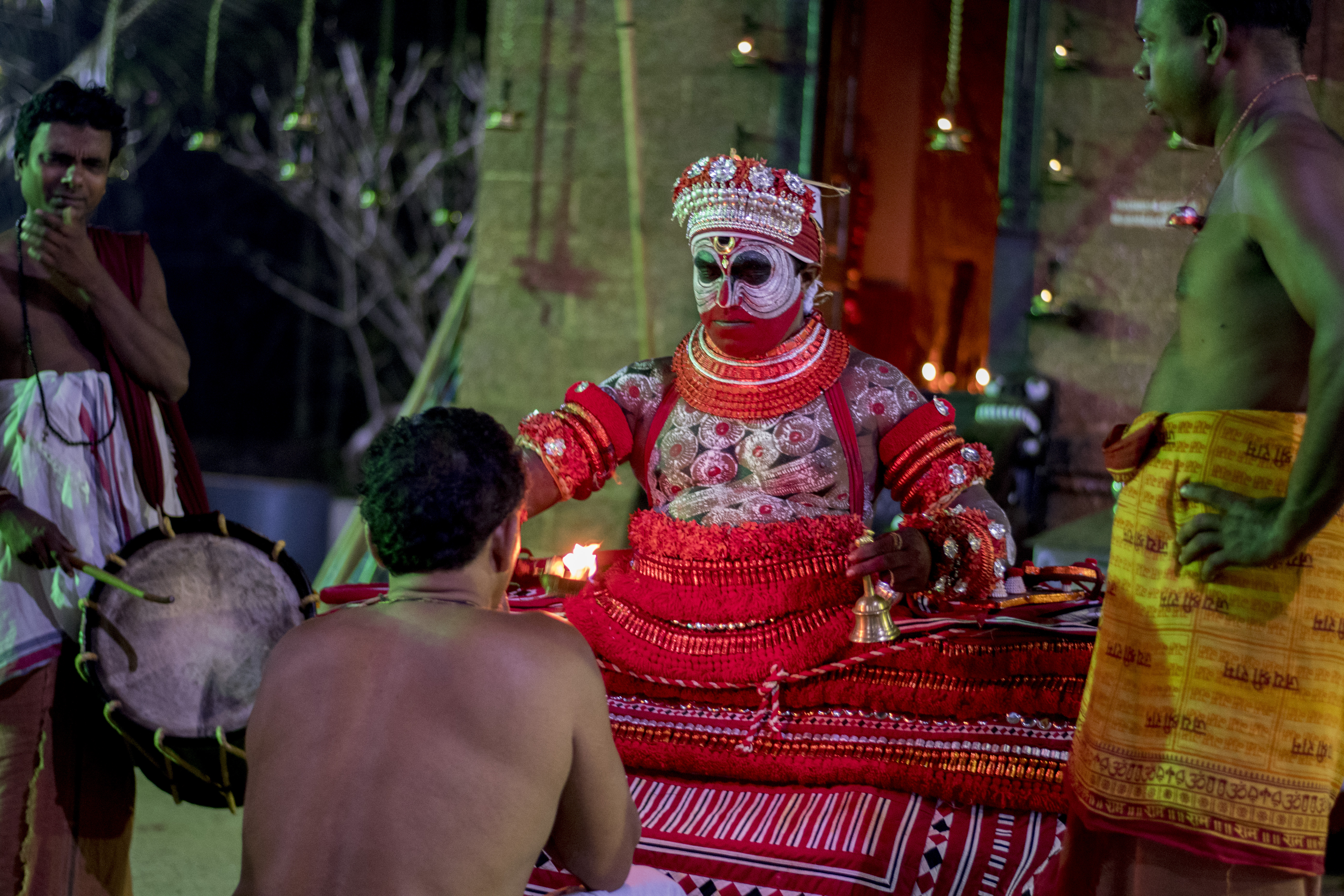
Thottam of Kuttichaathan theyyam

== See also ==
- Thottam Pattukal in Malayalam
- North Malabar
