= Kathivanoor Veeran =

Hindu god

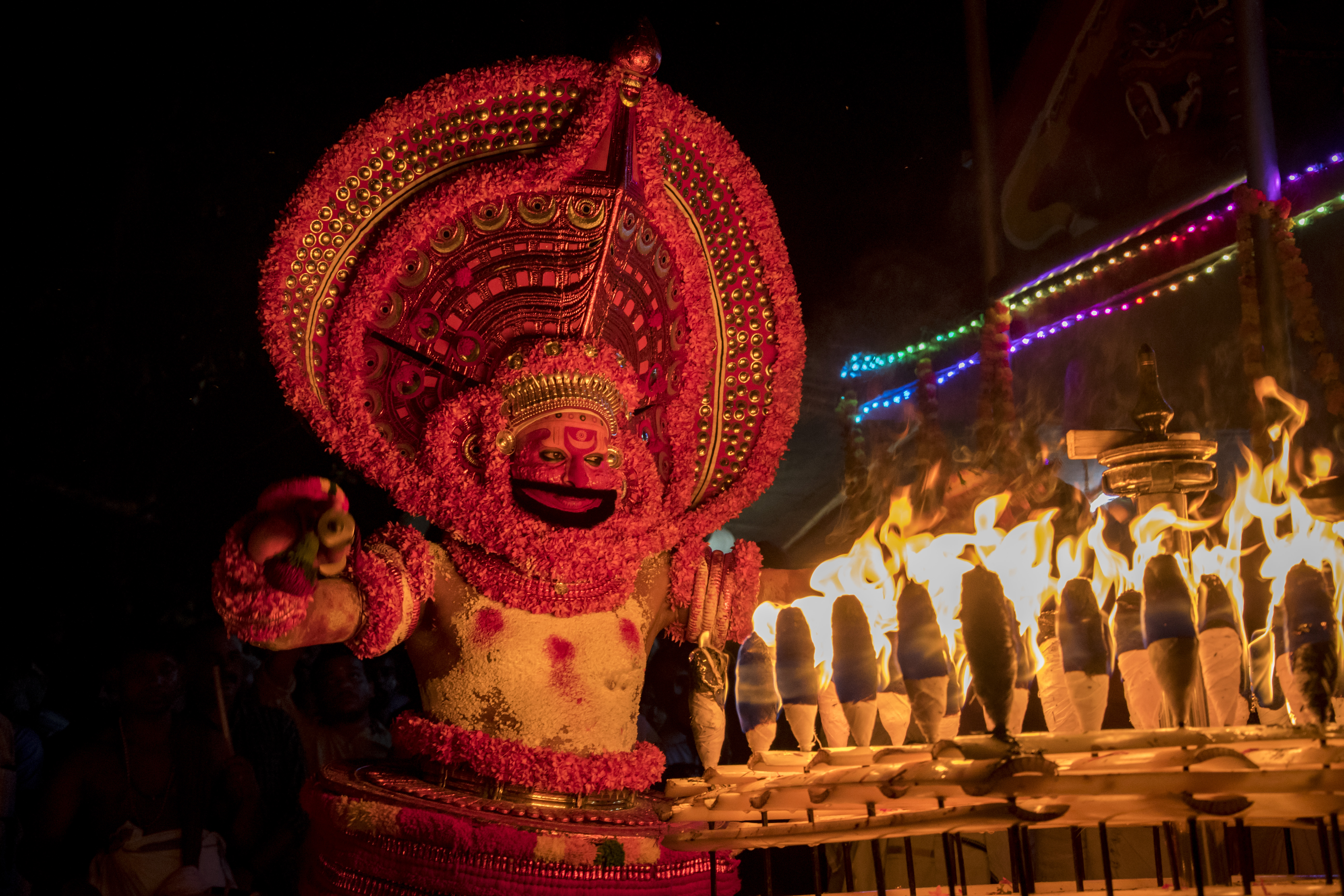
- Kathivanoor Veeran Theyyam
- Affiliation: Hinduism
- Region: North Malabar, Kerala, India

Genealogy
- Spouse: Chemmarathi

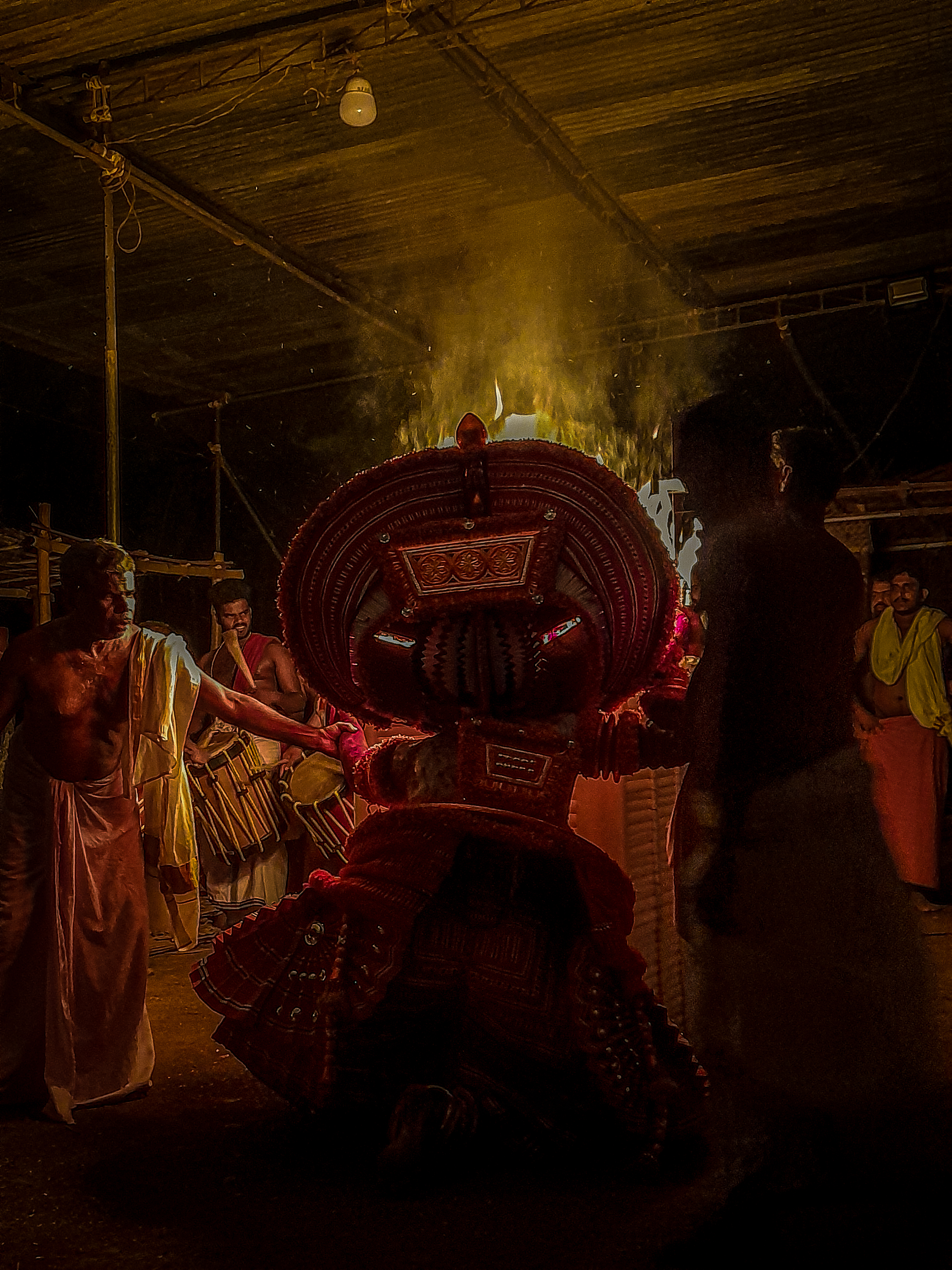
Kathivanoor Veeran, Korom, Payyannur

Kathivanoor Veeran (also known as the Mandhappan Chekavar) is a deity worshiped in North Malabar region in Kerala, India. The word 'Veeran' in Malayalam means 'Hero' in English. According to the legend, the Kathivanoor Veeran is apotheosis of Thiyya warrior Mandappan Chekavar. Mandappan's life and his transformation into god are still active in the folklore of Kolathunadu region, and is practiced as theyyam in various temples in present-day Kannur and Kasaragod districts. Kathivanoor Veeran Theyyam is one of the most popular Theyyams in North Malabar. Women of North Malabar region worship Kathivanoor Veeran to get a healthy husband.

== Legend ==
Mandappan Chekavar (also spelled as Mannappan) who later became the deity Kathivanoor Veeran was born to huge thiyya landlord Kumarappan of Mangad Methaliyillam house and Chaki Amma of Parakayillam house. It is said that Mandappan, a resident of present-day Mangad in Kannur district, was born with the blessings of goddess Chuzali. He was skilled in martial arts and wanted to become a warrior. Instead of going to work, he hunted deer and quail in the woods with his friends. Although Kumarappan forbids the family from giving rice and milk to his son, who is not working, his mother Chaki secretly gave him rice out of love for his son. Kumarappan gets angry when he sees this, and he breaks his son Mandappan's bow.

Kathivanoor Veeran Theyyam at Mambalam, Kannur

Saddened by this, Mandappan leaves home and joins his friends who are going to Kodagu hills for business. They give him alcohol and leave the place without taking him. After waking up from his alcoholism, Mandappan wandered alone and finally reached his uncle's house in Kathivanoor. He starts living there, and over time, he gets half of his uncle's property. On the advice of his aunt, he starts an oil business and in the meantime meets and marries Velarkot Chemmarathi.

After starting to live in his wife's house, she used to quarrel with Mandappan, who was often late at home. On an unfortunate day, his last, he gets into a quarrel with her and she curses him for being late. When Mandappan heard that an army was coming from Kodagu to attack his village, he took up arms, saluted the deities, and went to war. There was a fierce battle with the soldiers from Kodagu.

Mandappan won the battle, but on his way back home he realizes that he has lost his pedestal ring and little finger during the battle. Although his friends tried to hold him back, telling him never to go to the battlefield alone, he goes back to recover it. The fighters from Kodagu, who were in a state of defeat, deceitfully kill Mandappan on his return. Chemmarathi, waiting for Mandappan, saw the pedestal ring and little finger fall on a banana leaf. Chemmarathi commits suicide by jumping into Mandappan's pyre.

When the uncle and son Annukkan return after their funeral, they see Mandappan and Chemmarathi, who have become gods. Mandappan Chekavar's Theyyam is performed for the first time in the presence of his uncle, who names the theyyam as Kathivanoor Veeran. This is the myth behind Kathivanoor Veeran.

== Kathivanoor Veeran Theyyam ==
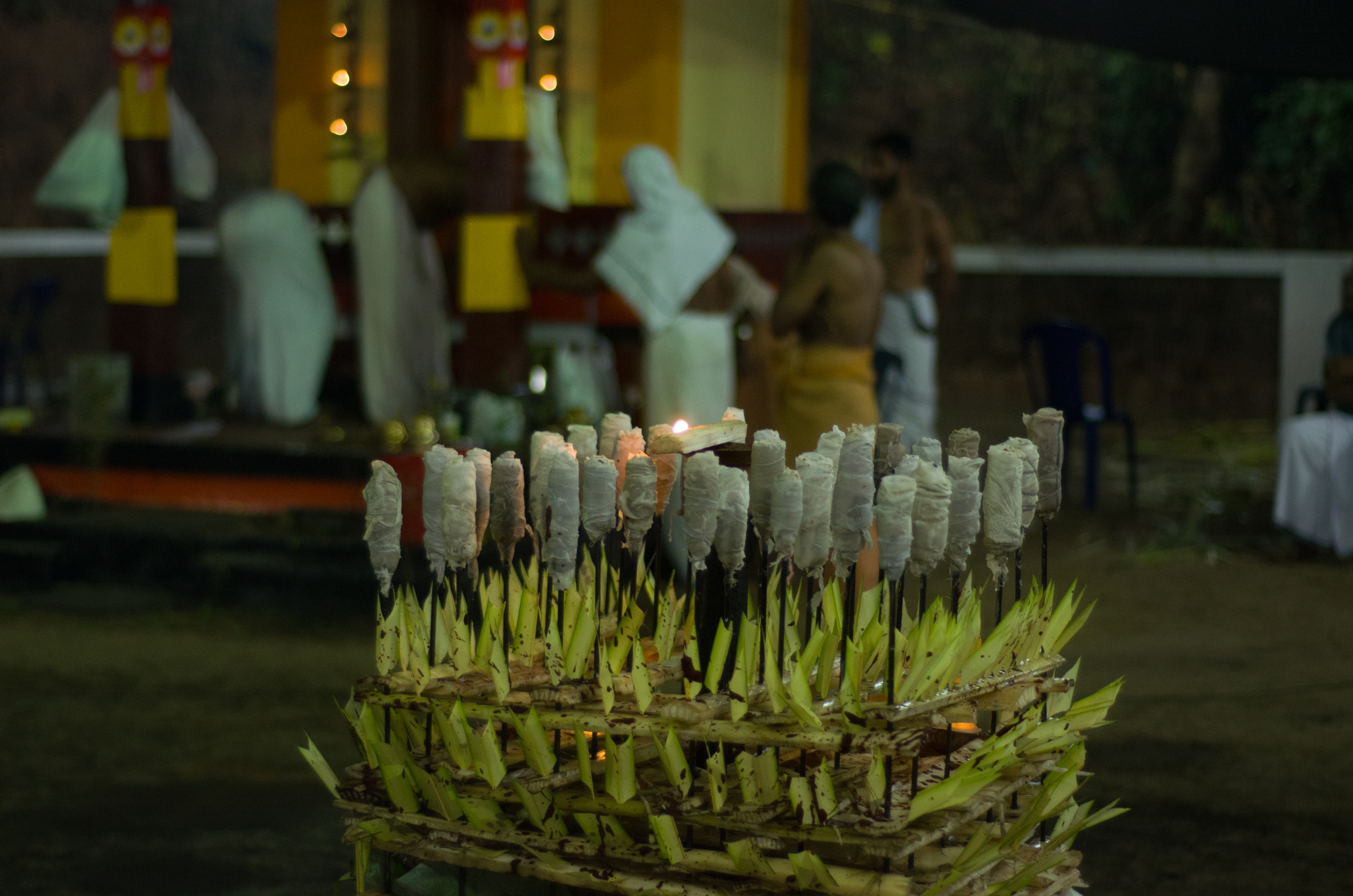
Chemmarathi thara

Kathivanur Veeran Theyyam is characterized by its dynamic movement and flexibility. This Theyyam is usually performed at night or in very early morning. The specially prepared cell where Kathivanoor Veeran Theyyam performs is made of banana and multi-colored dyes and sticks with fire and is known as Chemmarathi thara. The concept is that it is his wife, Chemmarathi. Its sixty-four cells are a reminder that Kathivanur Veeran's body was thrown into sixty-four pieces in the treachery of the Kodakars. Theyyam's face art is known as Nakam Thazhthi Ezhuthu. There will be beards and mustaches in the face.

Kathivanoor Veeran Thottam Pattu

Many girls of North Malabar region still worship Kathivanoor Veeran to get a healthy husband. A Kathivannur Veeran Theyyam performer should be proficient in all subjects. Visitors can ask any questions to the theyyam and the theyyam should give the right answer.

== Works on Kathivanoor Veeran ==
Kalady Sankaracharya College Malayalam Professor Lissie Mathew's book, Kathivanoor Veeran: Malakayariya Manushyan, Churamirangiya Daivam (literally means 'Kathivanoor Veeran:The man who climbed the hill, the god who descended the pass') ISBN 9788120042926, published by Kerala Bhasha Institute, retraces Mandappan's transformation into the deity Kathivanoor veeran. Book is a textbook at Kannur University, Kalady Sanskrit University and Mother Teresa Women's University, Kodaikanal.

The children's literature book Kathivanoor Veeran written by PRD regional deputy director E. V. Sugathan, and published by Kerala Balasahithya Institute was released on 17 October 2021.

A film titled Kathivanur Veeran is being made under the banner of Sree Mookambika Communications, which was started by a group of Gulf Malayalees. The film is expected to cost over 50 million Indian rupee is directed by Gireesh Kunnummal. Rajmohan Neeleswaram and T Pavithran are writing the script.

== In popular culture ==
- Kaliyattam (1997) - The song that starts with Kathivannur Veerane in the 1997 movie tells the story of Kathivannur Veeran.

== See also ==
- Kadangot Makkam
