= Chenankavu =

Bhagavati temple in Kerala

Chenankavu (Malayalam: ശ്രീ ചേനാങ്കാവ് ഭഗവതി ക്ഷേത്രം) is a Bhagavathi temple in Korom village, Payyanur municipality, Kannur district, Kerala. It is known for two annual festivals, Vishu Mahotsavam and Saptaham Vayana, held concurrently in the first half of April.
