= Muchilot Bhagavathi =

Vedic Hindu deity

Muchilot Bhagavathi Is The Tutelary Deity Of Vaniyar Community In North Malabar.

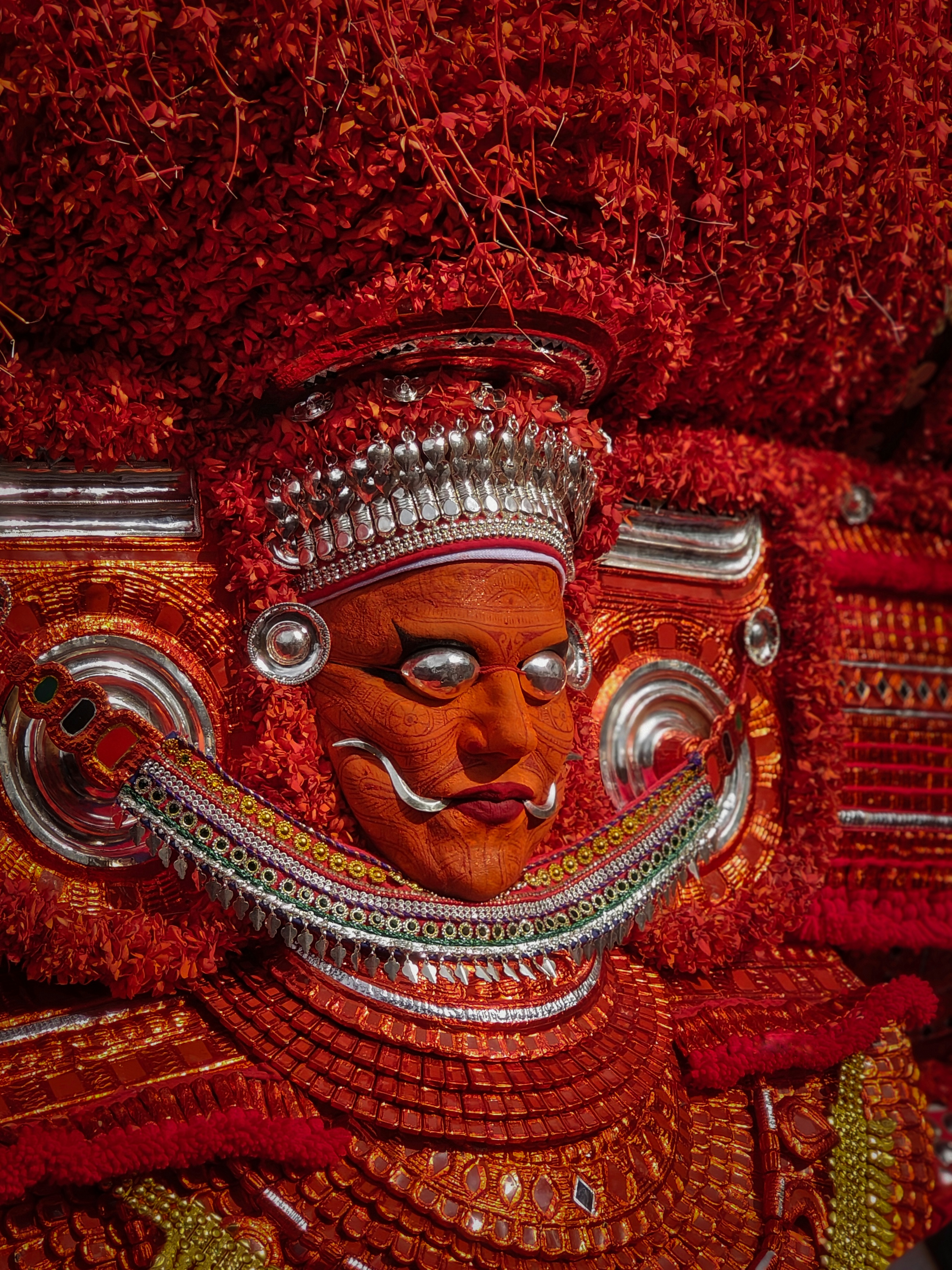
Muchilot Bhagavathi

Being In Swatika Bhava, Muchilot Bhagavathi has gentle movements. Anna Dhanam (serving food) is important in Muchilot Bhagavathi Temples during the Kaliyattam Festival.

== Legends ==
Various legends on the origin of Muchilot Bhagavati begin with her as a Brahmin woman born in Maniyottu Mana, a house associated with the highest caste in the village of Perinchellur, near Taliparamba, Kerala.

The popular oral lore states that following the end of her studies and before her betrothal, the elder teacher of Perinchellur (Perinchellur Mootha Gurukkal, a Brahmin) and his disciples challenged her authority on Vedic matters.She defeated them in all kind of debates and afterwards jealous of her wisdom, they asked the girl what the greatest pain and greatest pleasure were. She replied that they were, respectively, giving birth and love-making. The Gurukkal then challenged her virginity, arguing that she could not know this without experiencing it. She was expelled from her house and took refuge at the temple in Karivellur and promptly resolved to meet the great god Shiva through suicide. While standing on a bed of burning coals, a member of the vāṇiya caste was passing through and was carrying thuthika(Oil pot) for supplying oil to the rayaramangalam temple, She requested him to pour coconut oil over her and cause her immolation. With the blessing of Shiva, she returned to the world as a goddess and began wandering the earth.

According to the narratives, the Muchilot Padanayar—a Vaniya of the Muchilot clan and a soldier of King Kolathiri—and his wife, Padanayathi, were able to feel her presence. The wife of Padanayar was drawing water from the housewell and saw an apparition of Muchilot Bhagavathi in the well. Afterwards, the pot which held the oil that burned the girl began to levitate. The next day, Muchilot Padanayar saw that the palm tree in front of his house had died; when he decided to cut the tree down to make weapons, the goddess made her presence visible to him. Padanayar then had a vision that the soul of the virgin had been sent back by Lord Shiva to abide in him. They placed the goddess in a silver chest in the western chamber of the house, therefore being associated with the vāṇiya community. Muchilottu Vaniyan and others in his community started worshipping the goddess as their family deity. Thus the goddess came to be known as Muchilot Bhagavathi.

But according to the holy manuscript (Pattola) of Muchilot Bhagavathi, Muchilot Bhagavathi is the kaliyuga avatar of Sita devi of treta yuga, Maya Devi of Dwarapa era, and Gaiyatri Devi who appeared before Viswamitra Maharishi. Lord Shiva created this powerful goddess for the wellbeing of humans and sent her to the Earth in a golden chariot called "Otta thanden". While travelling on the Earth, she rested at the padippura of Muchilot Pada Nair, who was a soldier belonging to the Muchilot clan among the vāṇiyas.

There are more than 108 Muchilot temples spread across North Kerala, most of them in Kannur District. Among these 108 temples the first seven temples are considered as "Aroodam" or Most revered.
