= Chapparapadavu =

- Village
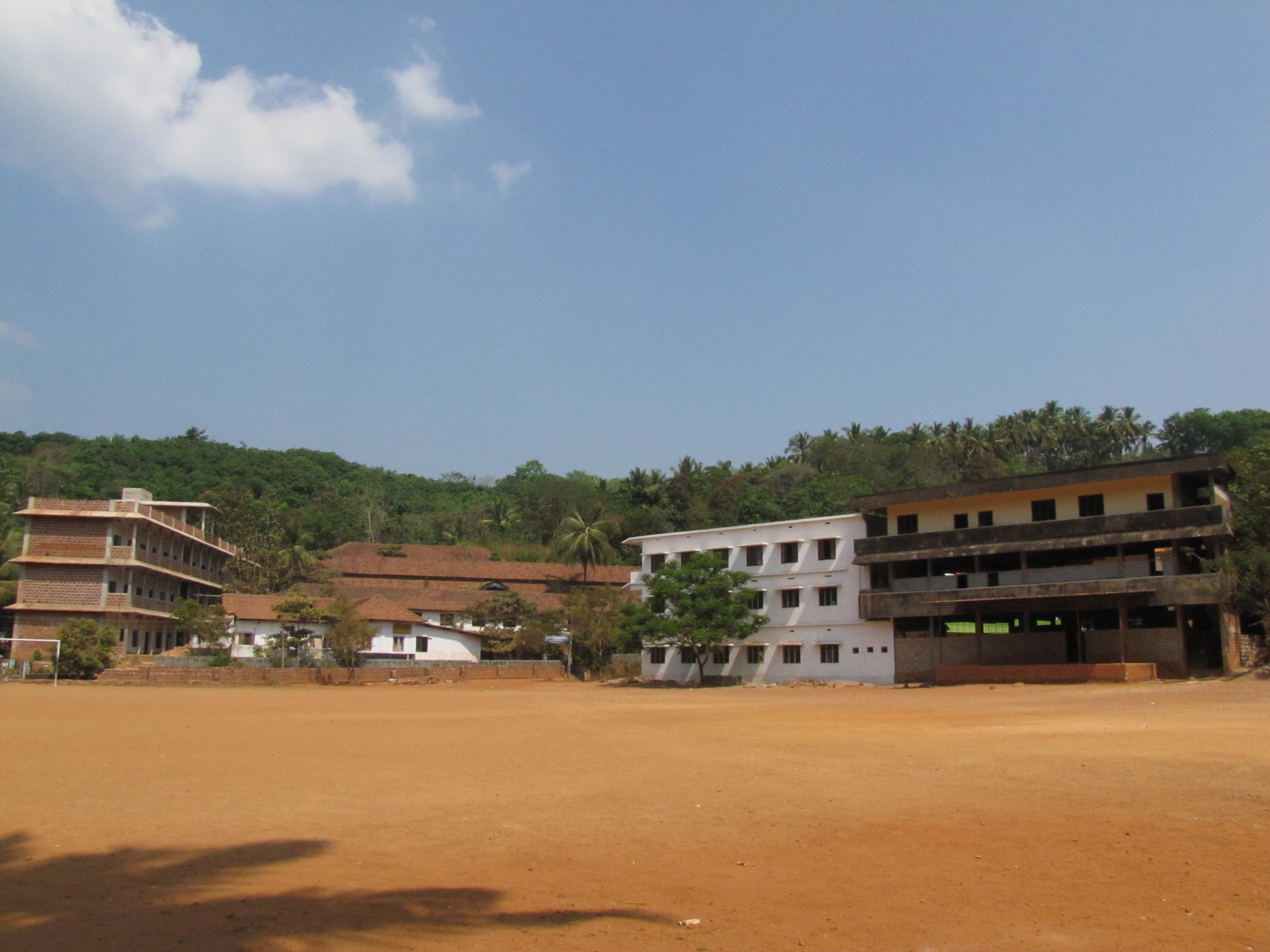
- Chapparapadavu Higher Secondary School

- Location in Kerala, India Chapparapadavu (India)
- Coordinates: 12.1298°N 75.4141°E
- Country: India
- State: Kerala
- District: Kannur
- Taluk: Taliparamba

Government
  - Type: Panchayati Raj (India)
  - Body: Grama Panchayat

Area
  - Total: 69.99 km^{2} (27.02 sq mi)

Population (2011)
  - Total: 31,622
  - Density: 451.8/km^{2} (1,170/sq mi)

Languages
  - Official: Malayalam, English
- Time zone: UTC+5:30 (IST)
- PIN: 670581
- Telephone code: 04982
- ISO 3166 code: IN-KL
- Vehicle registration: KL-59
- Niyamasabha constituency: Taliparamba
- Lok Sabha constituency: Kannur

Chapparapadavu is a Grama panchayat in Kannur district in the Indian state of Kerala. This Panchayat is spread across three revenue villages like Kooveri, Thimiri and Vellad.

== Demographics ==
As of 2011 Census, Chapparapadavu Grama Panchayat had a population of 31,622 among which 15,322 are males and 16,300 females. Of that population, 10.9% was under 6 years of age. The average literacy of 92.8% was lower than the state average of 94%.

== Administration ==
Chapparapadavu Grama Panchayat is part of Taliparamba (State Assembly constituency) in Kannur Loksabha constituency.

== Transportation ==
Chapparappadavu is located at 14 km northeast of Taliparamba town. The national highway passes through Taliparamba. Goa and Mumbai can be accessed on the northern side and Cochin and Thiruvananthapuram on the southern side. Taliparamba has a bus station and buses are easily available to all parts of Kannur district. The road from Taliparamba to the east of Iritty connects to Mysore and Bangalore but buses to these cities are available only from Kannur, 22 km to the south. The nearest railway stations are Kannapuram and Kannur on Mangalore-Palakkad line. Trains are available to almost all parts of India. There are airports at Kannur, Mangalore and Calicut. All of them are small international airports with direct flights available only to Middle Eastern countries.

== See also ==
- Kooveri
- Padapengad
- Thiruvettoor

== Image gallery ==
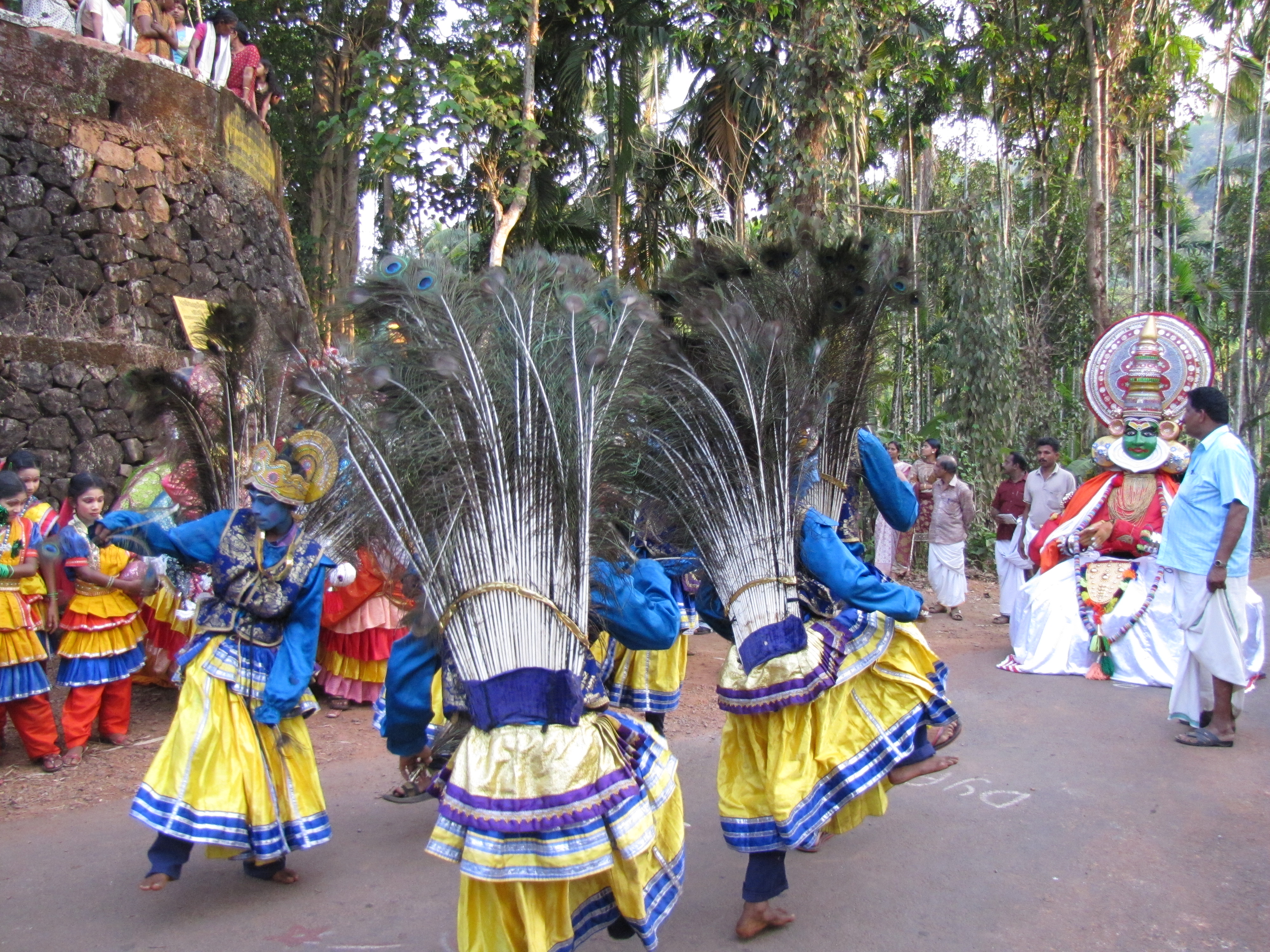
Peacock Dance

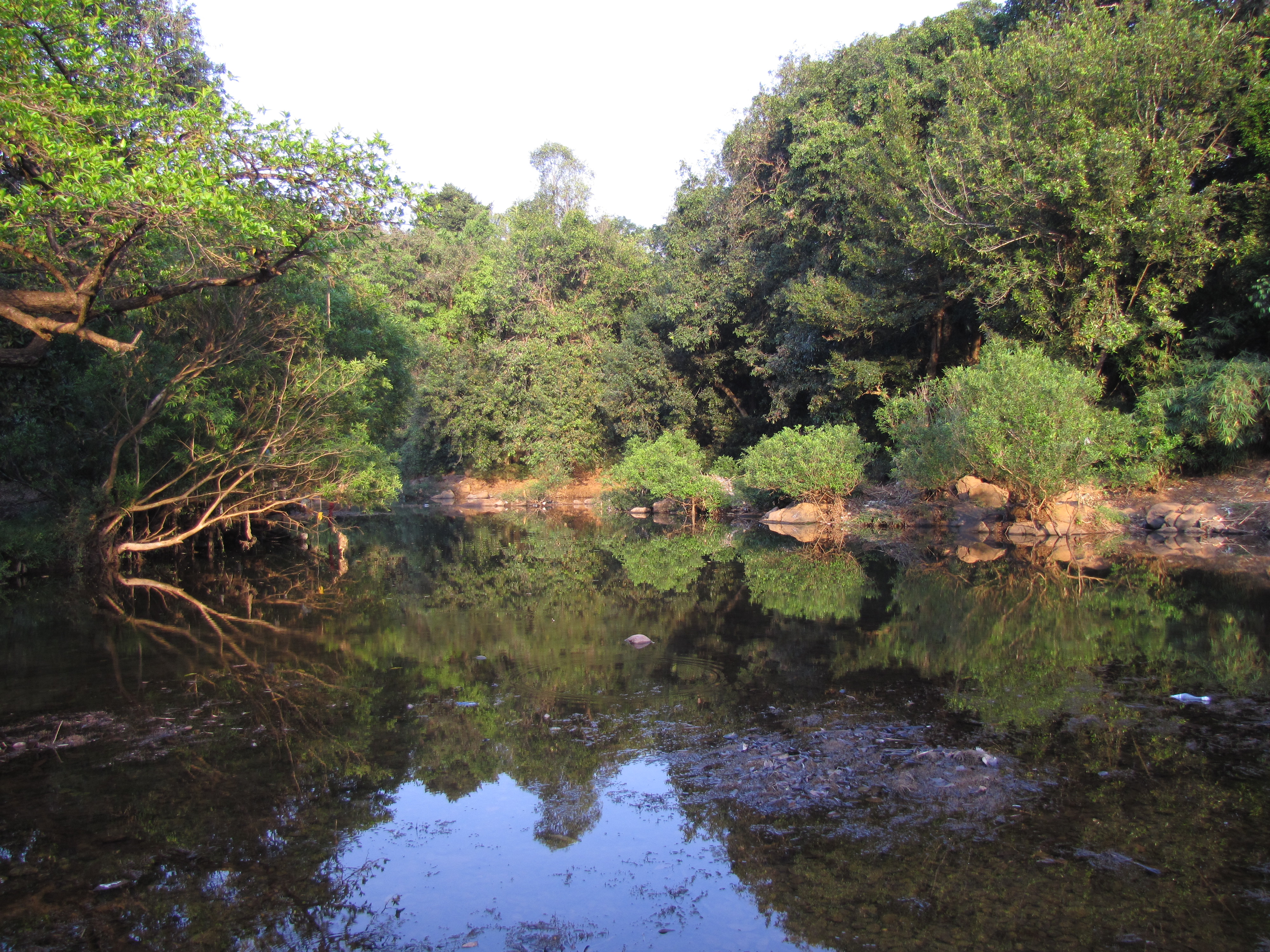
Panthrandam Chall Bird Sanctuary

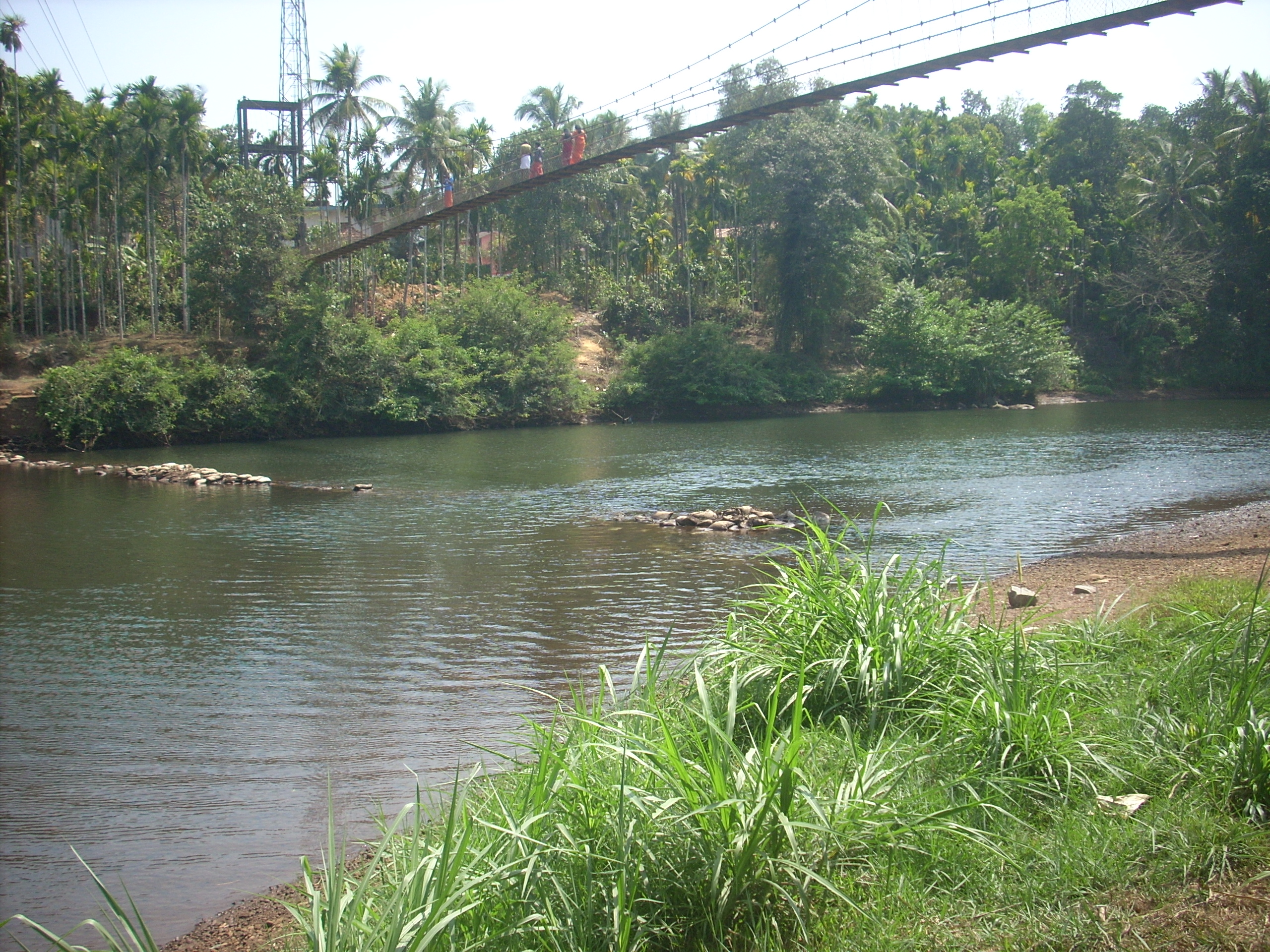
Kooveri Suspension Bridge

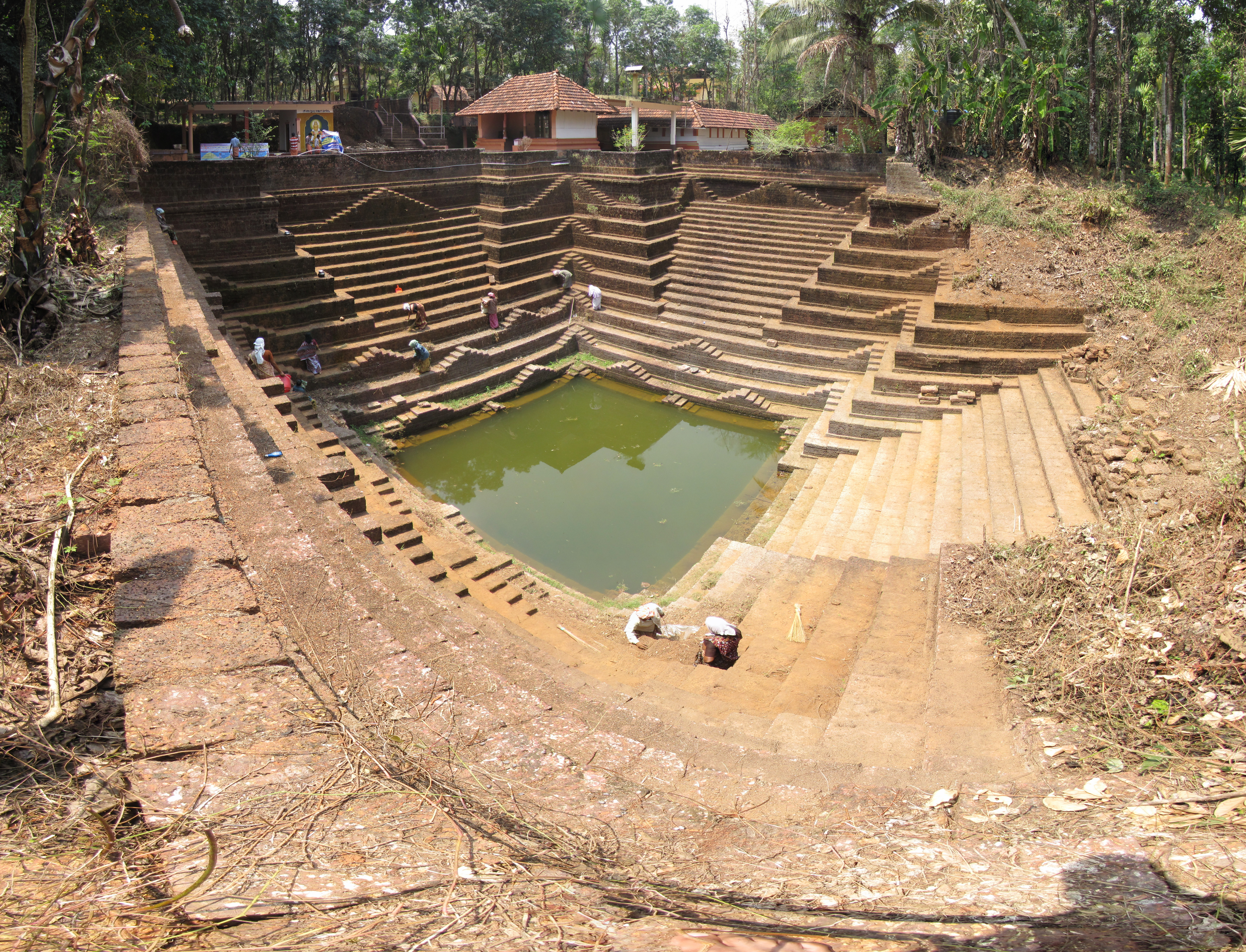
Sree Someswari Temple, Koovery
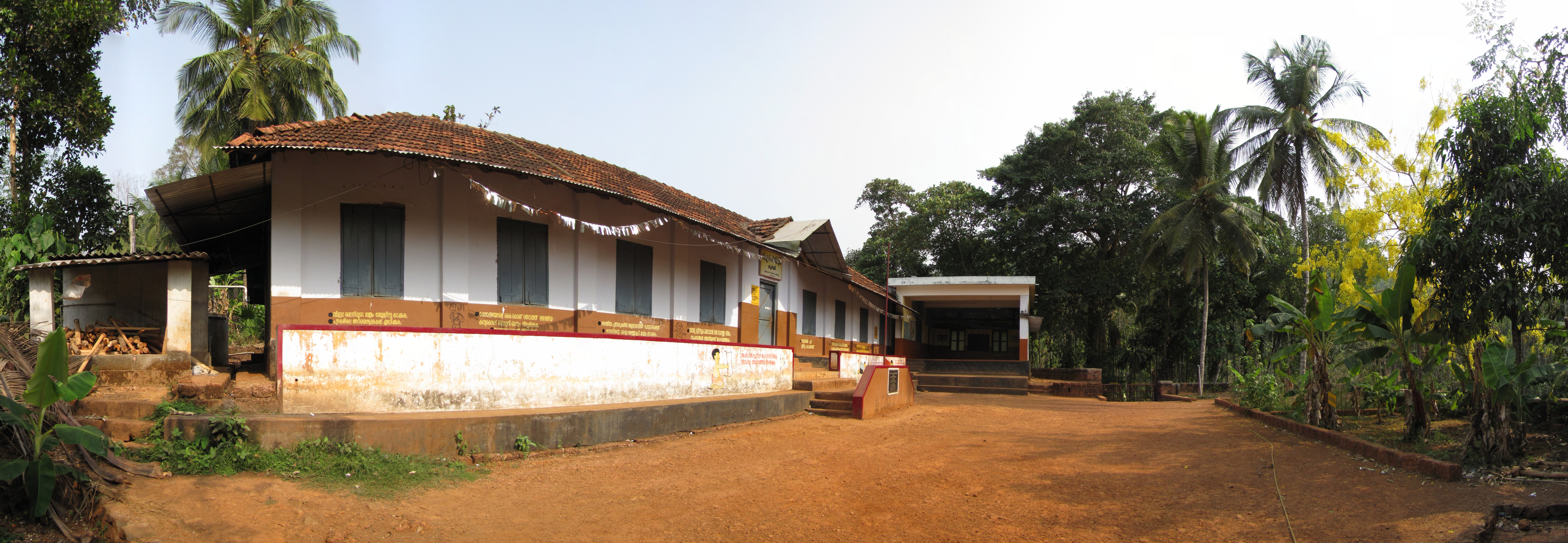
Koovery School
