= Kooveri =

Kooveri Koovery
- village
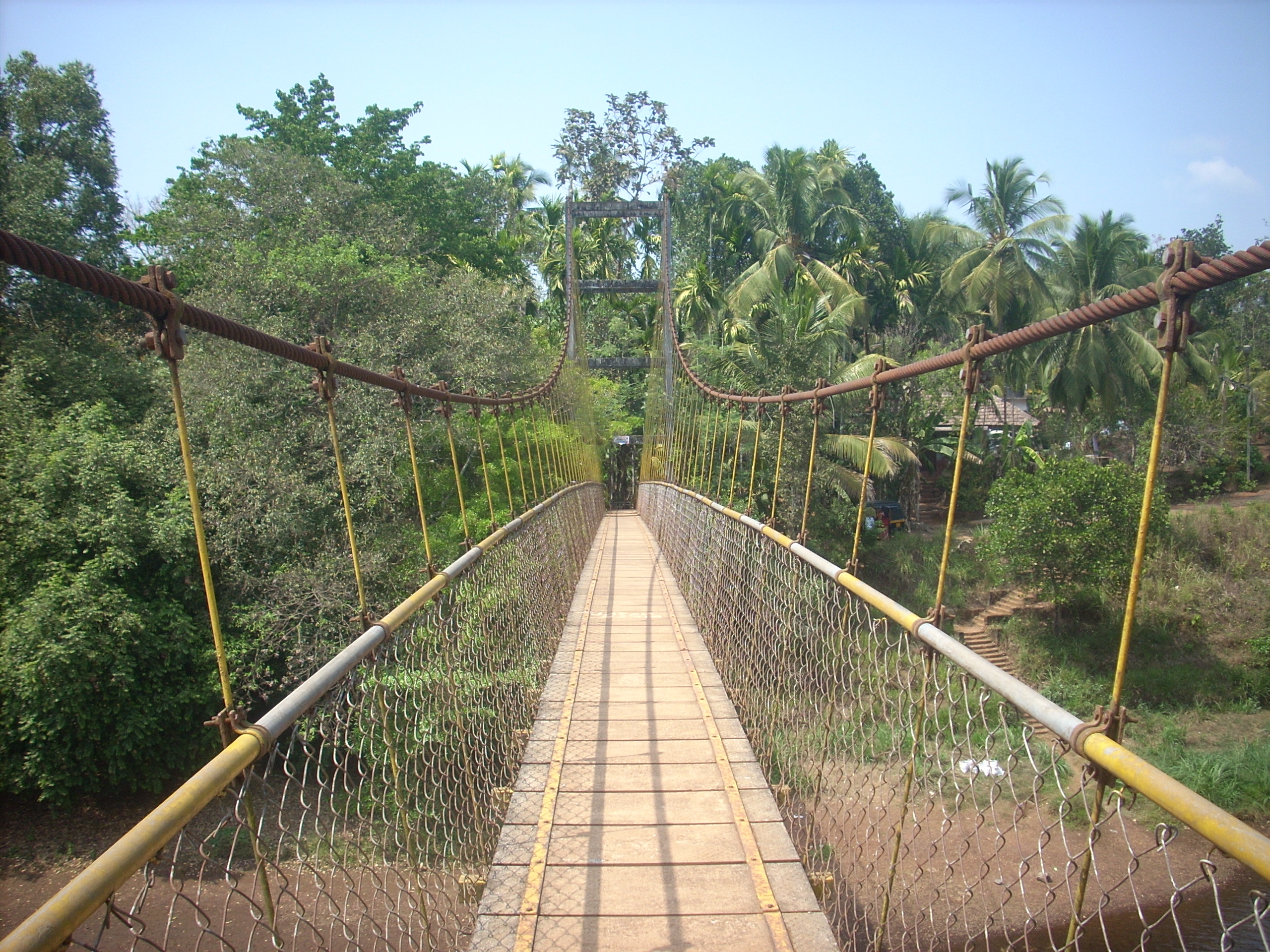
- Kooveri Suspension Bridge

- Location in Kerala, India
- Coordinates: 12.10938°N 75.39413°E
- Country: India
- State: Kerala
- District: Kannur

Government
  - Body: Chapparapadavu Grama Panchayat

Area
  - Total: 38.32 km^{2} (14.80 sq mi)

Population (2011)
  - Total: 19,033
  - Density: 496.7/km^{2} (1,286/sq mi)

Languages
  - Official: Malayalam, English
- Time zone: UTC+5:30 (IST)
- PIN: 670581
- Vehicle registration: KL 59
- Nearest city: Taliparamba
- Lok Sabha constituency: Kannur
- Vidhan Sabha constituency: Taliparamba

Kooveri is a village in Chapparapadavu Grama Panchayat of Kannur district in the Indian state of Kerala.

== Demographics ==
As of 2011 India census, Kooveri had a population of 19,033 with 9,111 (47.9%) males and 9,922 (52.1%) females. Kooveri village has an area of 38.32 km^{2} with 4,201 families residing in it. Average sex ratio was 1089 higher than the state average of 1084. In Kooveri, 11.3% of the population was under 6 years of age. Kooveri had an average literacy of 91.7% lower than the state average of 94%; male literacy was 95.9% and female literacy was 87.9%.

== Administration ==
Kooveri village is a part of Chapparapadavu Grama Panchayat in the Taliparamba Block Panchayat. Politically, the village is a part of the Taliparamba State Assembly constituency under Kannur Loksabha.
