= Muyyam =

Village in Kannur district, Kerala, India

Coordinates: 12.037787°N 75.374367°E

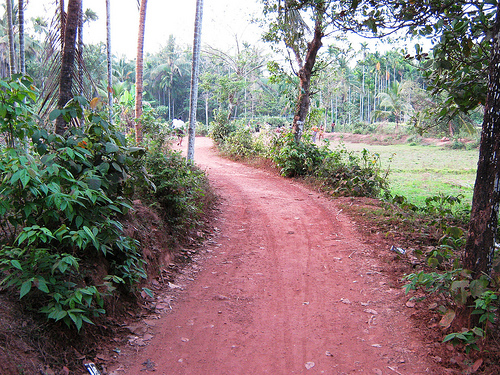
Muyyam village

Muyyam is a village located in the Kannur district of Kerala, India.

== Location ==
Muyyam is located near Karimbam town in Taliparamba taluk of Kannur district in Kerala state.

== Post office ==
There is a post office at Muyyam and the postal code is 670142.

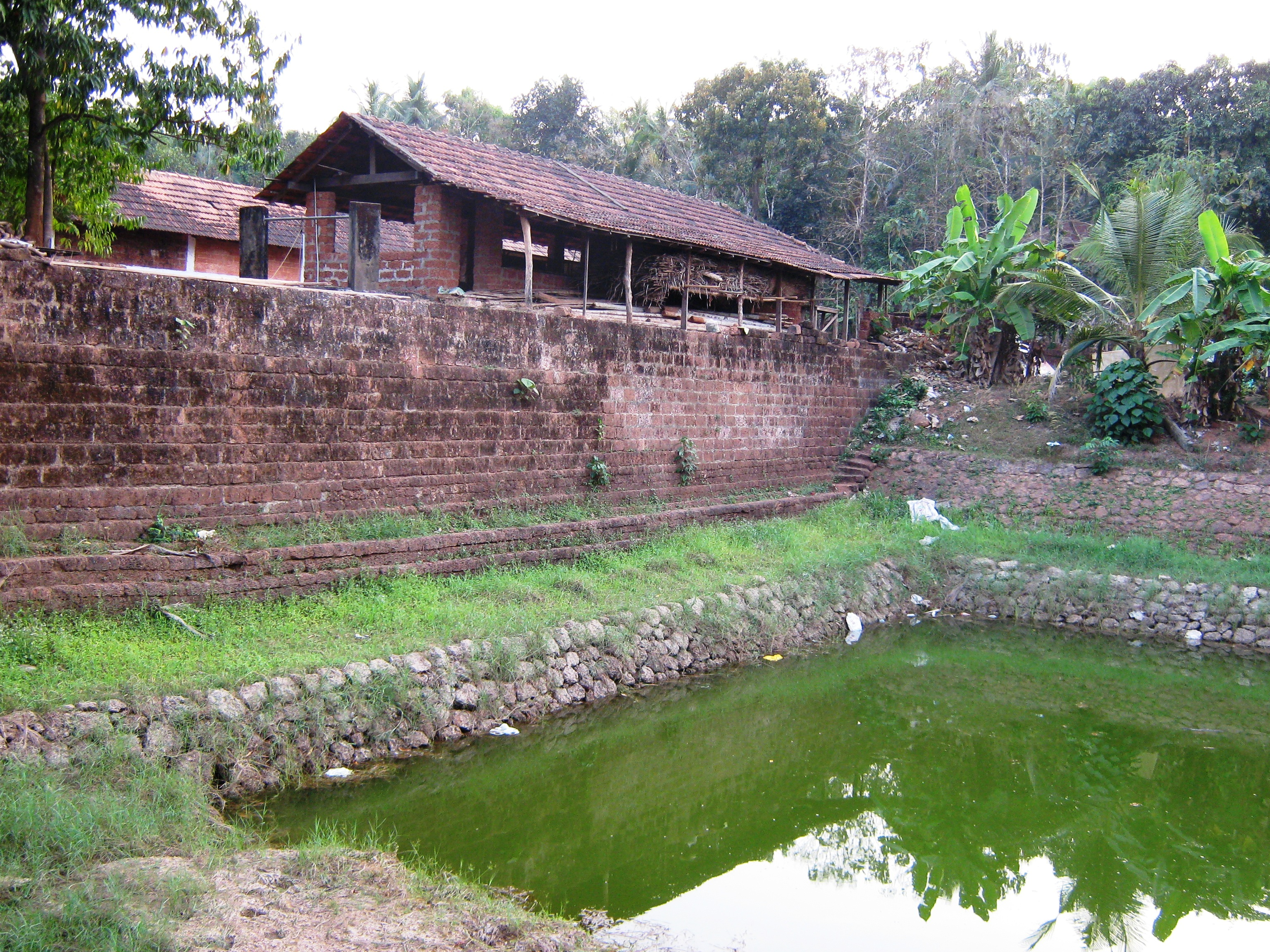
Varadool Temple, Muyyam
