= Perumpadavu =

Perumpadavu Perumbadavu
- Village
- Location in Kerala, India Perumpadavu (India)
- Coordinates: 12.1675°N 75.3908°E
- Country: India
- State: Kerala
- District: Kannur

Languages
  - Official: Malayalam, English
- Time zone: UTC+5:30 (IST)
- PIN: 670581
- Telephone code: 04982
- ISO 3166 code: IN-KL
- Vehicle registration: KL-59,86
- Nearest railway station: Payyanur - 31 km
- Niyamasabha constituency: Taliparamba
- Lok Sabha constituency: Kannur

Perumpadavu is a village in the Kannur district of Kerala, India. Perumpadavu comes under ward no.1 of the Chapparapadavu Grama Panchayat.

== Location ==
Perumpadavu is located 43 km away from Kannur city, 22 km north of Taliparamba town and 28 km east of Payyanur town.

== Culture ==
Karippal Nagam is a temple dedicated to the serpent god. It is located at karippal near perumpadavu in the Kannur district. The Ayilyam festival is most important for this temple. The festival falls on Ayilyam star of the Dhanu month in the Malayalam Calendar. Devotees visit in large numbers, during the festive seasons.

== Education ==
- BVJM HSS Perumpadavu
- Oxford English school, Perumpadavu
- St. Joseph English school Perumpadave
- GLPS Thalavil
- SVUP school, Karippal
- MAMLP school Vellakkad

== Transportation ==
National Highway (NH 66) passes through Taliparamba town. Mumbai and Mangalore can be accessed on the northern side and Cochin and Trivandrum from the southern side. The road to the east connects to Mysore and Bangalore. The nearest railway station is 31 km away Payyanur on Shoranur-Mangalore Section under Southern Railway. The nearest airport is 54 km away Kannur International Airport.

== See also ==
- Chapparapadavu
- Eramam
- Kooveri
- Kuttur (Payyanur)
- Mathamangalam
- Thimiri
- Vellora
