= Kovval =

- village
- Location in Kerala, India Kovval (India)
- Coordinates: 12.0809700°N 75.2627200°E
- Country: India
- State: Kerala
- District: Kannur

Government
  - Body: Panchayat

Languages
  - Official: Malayalam, English
- Time zone: UTC+5:30 (IST)
- Postal code: 670501
- ISO 3166 code: IN-KL

Kovval is a village in Cheruthazham, which is a census town in Kannur district in the state of Kerala, India.

== Temples ==
Kovval is the located in the neighbourhood of the famous Hanumarambalam, dedicated to Sri Rama and Hanuman. Kovval is also surrounded by many other temples namely, the KunninMathilakam Siva Temple and Uliyathu SreeKrishna Temple. This is a typical village neighbourhood of Kannur.

== Transportation ==
The national highway passes through Pilathara junction. Goa and Mumbai can be accessed on the northern side and Cochin and Thiruvananthapuram can be accessed on the southern side. The road to the east of Iritty connects to Mysore and Bangalore. The nearest railway station is Payyanur on Mangalore-Palakkad line. Trains are available to almost all parts of India subject to advance booking over the internet. There are airports at Kannur, Mangalore and Calicut. All of them are international airports but direct flights are available only to Middle Eastern countries.
