= Ramapuram River =

River in Kerala, India

Location
- Country: India
- State: Kerala
- District: Kannur
- Taluk: Payyanur

Physical characteristics
- Source: Iringal hills (near Pariyaram)
  - elevation: 57 m (187 ft)
- Mouth: Arabian Sea / Perumba River
  - location: Olakkal azhi (south of Ezhimala)
- Length: 19 km (12 mi)
- Basin size: 52 km^{2} (20 sq mi)

The Ramapuram River (also known as Ramapuram Puzha) is a minor, west-flowing river in the Kannur district of Kerala, India. Measuring 19 kilometres (12 mi) in length, it is recognized as the shortest river in the Kannur district.

== Course and Basin ==
The river originates at the Iringal hills near Pariyaram village at an elevation of 57 metres (187 ft) above mean sea level. It drains a catchment area of approximately 52 square kilometres (20 sq mi) as it flows through the villages of Kolaprath Vayal and Cheruthazham. The river gets its name from the town of Ramapuram in Pazhayangadi, through which it passes.

East of the Ezhimala hills, the river reaches its destination points. One branch joins the southward distributary of the Perumba River, while the main stream empties into the Arabian Sea at Olakkal azhi, just south of Ezhimala.

== Ecology ==
The river basin supports local mangrove conservation efforts. The Cheruthazham Grama Panchayat, in partnership with the Wildlife Trust of India, manages the community-led Kannur Kandal Project along the Ramapuram River to restore degraded mangrove ecosystems.

== See also ==
- List of rivers of Kerala
