= Pilathara =

- Town
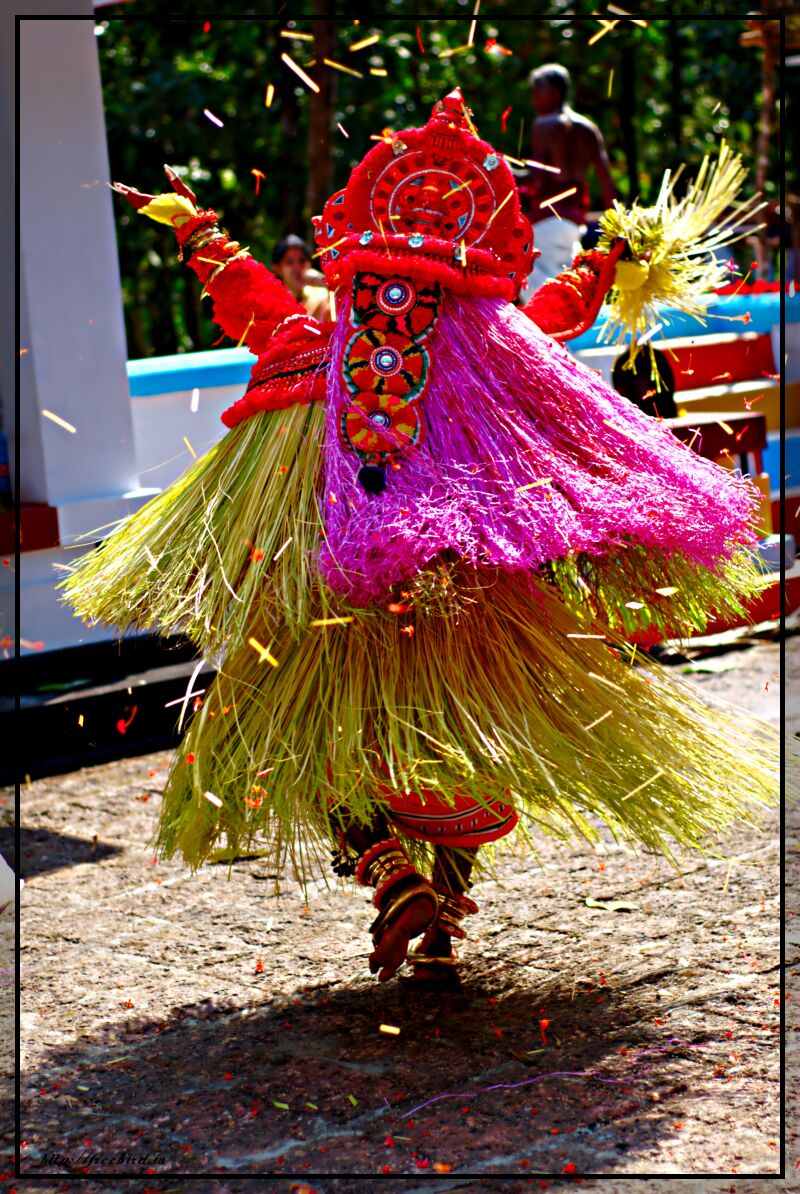
- Theyyam at Pilathara

- Location in Kerala, India Pilathara (India)
- Coordinates: 12.08549°N 75.25446°E
- Country: India
- State: Kerala
- District: Kannur
- Taluk: Payyanur

Government
  - Type: Panchayati Raj (India)
  - Body: Cheruthazham Grama Panchayat

Area
  - Total: 32.18 km^{2} (12.42 sq mi)
- Elevation: 18 m (59 ft)

Population (2011)
  - Total: 29,348
  - Density: 912.0/km^{2} (2,362/sq mi)

Languages
  - Official: Malayalam, English
- Time zone: UTC+5:30 (IST)
- PIN: 670501
- ISO 3166 code: IN-KL
- Vehicle registration: KL 86
- Nearest railway station: Pazhayangadi - 8km, Payyanur - 10km
- Assembly constituency: Kalliasseri
- Lok Sabha constituency: Kasaragod

Pilathara is a small town and junction located on National Highway 66 in Kannur district of Kerala, India. Three roads intersect at this junction: NH 66, Pappinisseri—Pilathara KSTP road and Cheruthazham-Peringome road. The Government Medical College, Kannur, also known as Pariyaram Medical College is located just 4 km from Pilathara. Pazhayangadi and Mathamangalam are located south and northeast of Pilathara, respectively. It falls under Payyanur taluk and Cheruthazham village. Kannur International Airport is the nearest airport, about 50 km away. The nearest railway station is Pazhayangadi, about 8 km from the town.

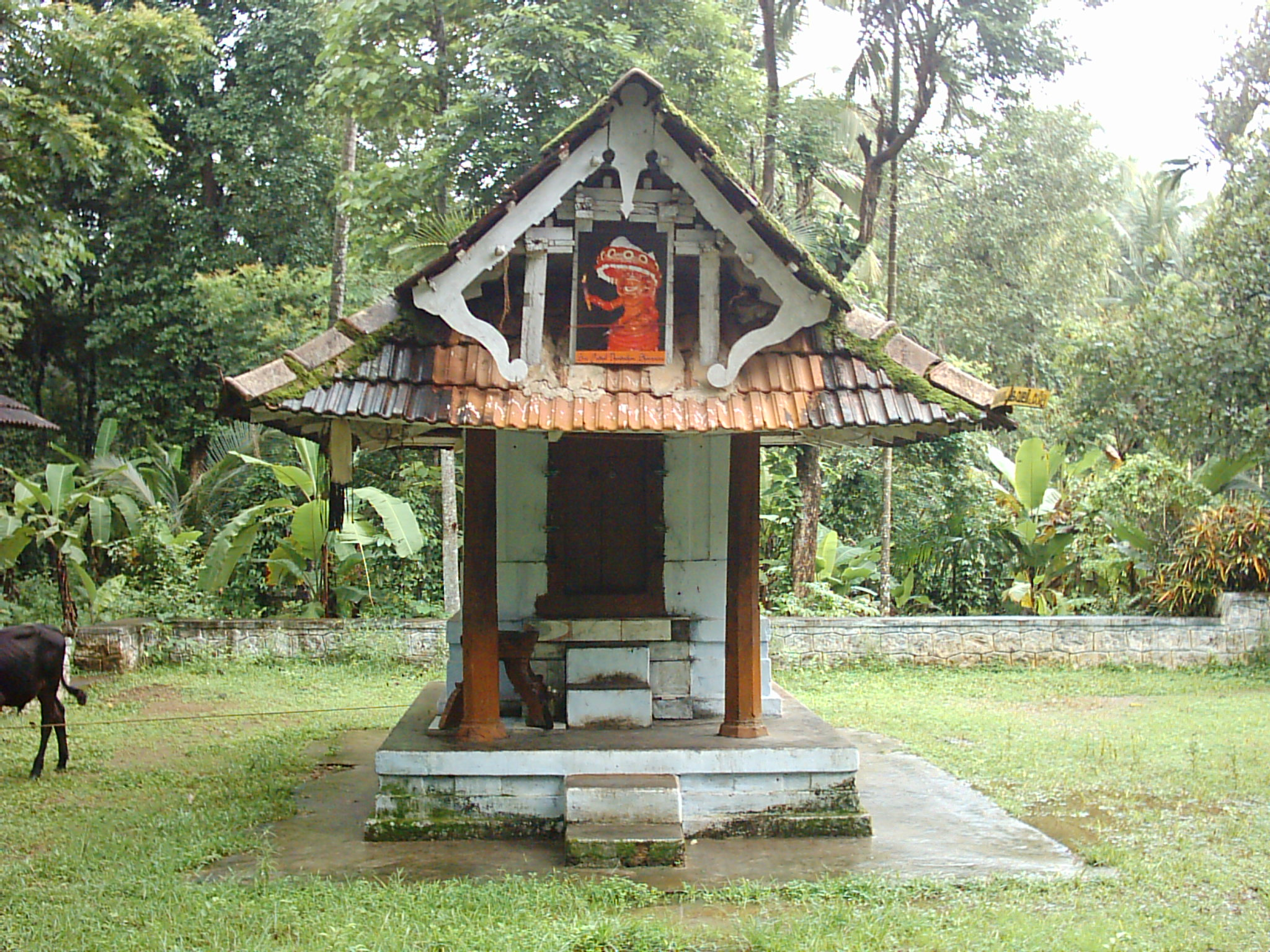
Temple at Pariyaram

Shri Svami Thondaccha: Moorthi Bhagavan pithamaha: prajapthi: bhrama amsha Avatharam mutthappan Thondachan eeshwaran madappura kav Kshetra temple at Pariyaram

== Samskriti Sahajeevan Heritage Museum ==
Samskriti-Sahajeevanam Heritage museum-Palamruthillam is a traditional Bungalow of the Brahmans built according to the architectural style of Kerala. The conventional residence of 4900 sq.feet two storey structure has extensive wooden carvings. Every nook and corner of this Illam is blessed with the minute carvings of different features. Almost 40 wooden frames and doors are showing the unique richness of this Illam. The Illam is owned and maintained by Samskrti, Pariyaram which is an institute of Cultural Research and action under Jesuit - run Socio- Cultural Centre.

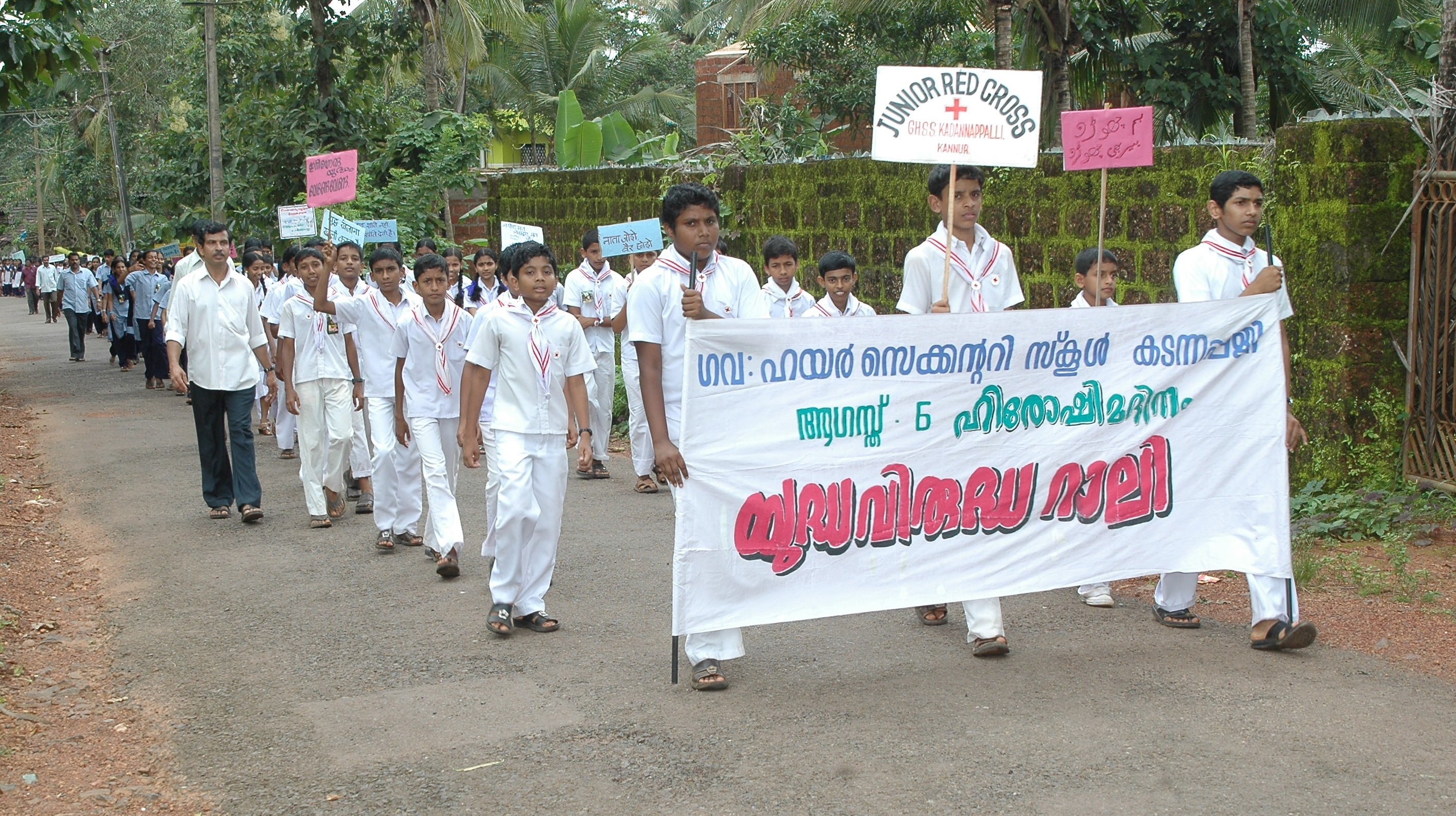
Government School, Kadannappally

== Educational Institutions ==
- Pilathara Co-op Arts & Science College
- St. Joseph's College, Pilathara
- Govt Institute for Paramedical Science, Pilathara
- Lasya College of Music and Dance, Pilathara
- Wadihuda Institute of Research and Advanced Studies, Vilayancode
- Samskrita Maha Vidyalayam Anjanēyagiri mandur (P.O), Chumaduthangi Pilathara
- Aravinda Vidyalayam Pilathara high school CBSE

== Villages near Pilathara ==
Ezhome, Cheruthazham, Edat, Kandamkulangara, Kunhimangalam, Perumba, Mathamangalam Ezhilode, Kadannappally and Pariyaram.

== Other places near Pilathara ==
- Payyannur 7 km from Pilathara
- Taliparamba 13 km from Pilathara
- Bekal Fort 48 km from Pilathara
- Payyambalam Beach 35 km from Pilathara
- Cherupuzha 30 km from Pilathara

== Transportation ==
The national highway-66 passes through Pilathara junction. Goa and Mumbai can be accessed on the northern side and Cochin and Thiruvananthapuram can be accessed on the southern side. Other major roads are Pilathara—Pappinisseri KSTP Road and Cheruthazham—Peringome Road. In that, Pappinisseri Pilathara KSTP road act as an NH bypass that reduces the distance and travel time between Kannur and Payyanur. The town has one bus terminal- Pilathara Bus Stand. The nearest railway stations are Payyanur and Pazhayangadi on Mangalore-Palakkad line. Trains are available to almost all parts of India subject to advance booking over the internet. There are airports at Kannur, Mangalore and Calicut. All of them are international airports but direct flights are available only to Middle Eastern countries.

== See also ==
- Mathamangalam
- Kadannappally
- Vellora
- Olayampadi
- Pariyaram
- Eramam
