= Kalliasseri Assembly constituency =

Constituency of the Kerala legislative assembly in India

Kalliasseri
- Constituency No. 7 for the Kerala Legislative Assembly
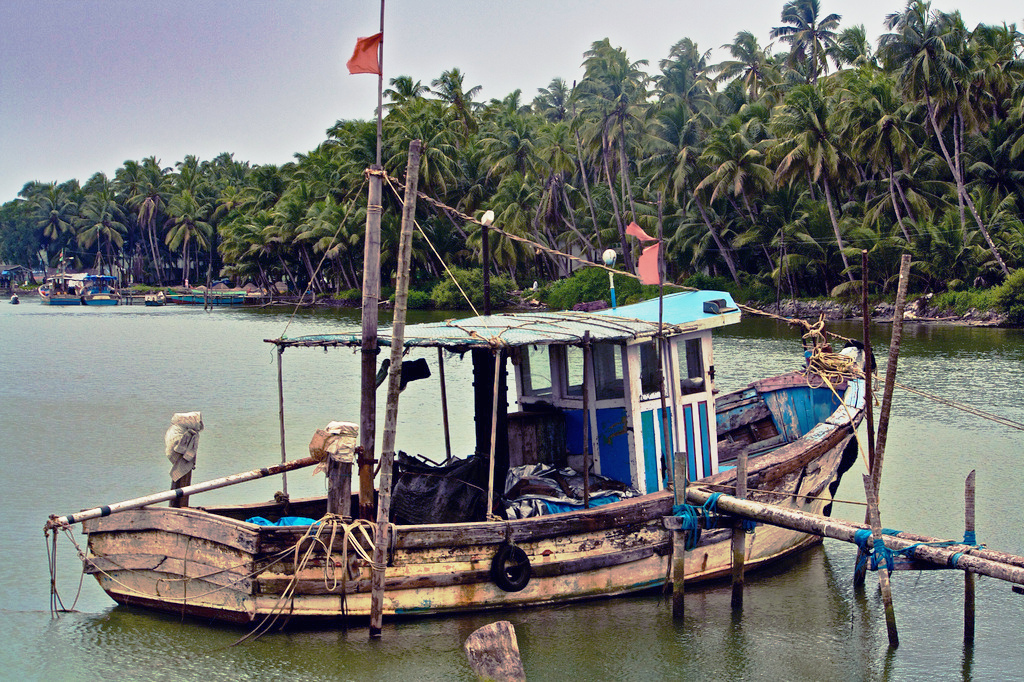
- Mattool in Kalliasseri Assembly constituency

Constituency details
- Country: India
- Region: South India
- State: Kerala
- District: Kannur
- Established: 2008
- Total electors: 1,84,923 (2021)
- Reservation: None

Member of Legislative Assembly
- 16th Kerala Legislative Assembly
- Incumbent M. Vijin
- Party: CPI(M)
- Alliance: LDF
- Elected year: 2026

Kalliasseri State assembly constituency is one of the 140 state legislative assembly constituencies in Kerala in southern India. It is also one of the seven state legislative assembly constituencies included in Kasaragod Lok Sabha constituency. As of the 2026 assembly elections, the current MLA is M. Vijin of CPI(M).

== Local self-governed segments ==
Kalliasseri Assembly constituency is composed of the following local self-governed segments:

Sl no.	Name	Status (Grama panchayat/Municipality)	Taluk
1	Cherukunnu	Grama panchayat	Kannur
2	Kalliasseri	Grama panchayat	Kannur
3	Kannapuram	Grama panchayat	Kannur
4	Mattool	Grama panchayat	Kannur
5	Cheruthazham	Grama panchayat	Payyanur
6	Ezhome	Grama panchayat	Payyanur
7	Kadannappalli-Panapuzha	Grama panchayat	Payyanur
8	Kunhimangalam	Grama panchayat	Payyanur
9	Madayi	Grama panchayat	Payyanur
10	Pattuvam	Grama panchayat	Taliparamba

== Members of Legislative Assembly ==
Election	Niyama Sabha	Name	Party	Tenure
2011	13th	T. V. Rajesh	Communist Party of India	2011-2016
2016	14th	T. V. Rajesh	Communist Party of India	2016-2021
2021	15th	M. Vijin	Communist Party of India	2021-2026
2026	16th	M. Vijin	Communist Party of India	2026-

== Election results ==
=== 2026 ===
2026 Kerala Legislative Assembly election: Kalliasseri
Party	Candidate	Votes	%	±%
CPI(M)	M. Vijin	81,428	50.93	▼9.69
INC	Rajeevan Kappachery	62,995	39.40	▲9.27
BJP	A. V. Sanil Kumar	13,110	8.20	▲0.39
SDPI	K. K. Abdul Jabbar	1,281	0.80	
Independent	Rajeevan Kannoth	160	0.10	
NOTA	None of the above	893	0.56	▲0.10
Margin of victory		18,433	11.53	▼18.98
Turnout		1,59,867	78.00	▼1.26
CPI(M) hold		Swing	▼9.69	

Panchayat	Booth Rows	UDF Votes	LDF Votes	NDA/BJP Votes	Leading Front	Lead
Kunhimangalam	16	4,733	7,309	1,093	LDF	2,576
Cheruthazham	26	7,148	13,662	2,158	LDF	6,514
Kadannappalli-Panapuzha	16	3,845	7,894	1,275	LDF	4,049
Madayi	30	13,297	6,708	1,137	UDF	6,589
Ezhome	16	4,866	7,935	797	LDF	3,069
Pattuvam	13	4,554	5,574	917	LDF	1,020
Cherukunnu	12	3,757	4,871	703	LDF	1,114
Kannapuram	17	3,534	9,071	1,698	LDF	5,537
Mattool	21	11,177	4,092	416	UDF	7,085
Kalliasseri	23	5,212	12,457	2,711	LDF	7,245
TOTAL	190	62,123	79,573	12,905	LDF	17,450

=== 2021 ===
There were 1,83,672 registered voters in the constituency for the 2021 election.

2021 Kerala Legislative Assembly election: Kalliasseri
Party	Candidate	Votes	%	±%
CPI(M)	M. Vijin	88,252	60.62	▲0.89
INC	Adv Brijesh Kumar	43,859	30.13	▲1.22
BJP	Arun Kaithapram	11,365	7.81	▼0.14
WPOI	Faizal Madayi	1,169	0.78	▲0.02
NOTA	None of the above	666	0.46	▲0.01
Independent	Brijeshkumar M	274	0.19	−
Margin of victory		44,393	30.51	▼0.41
Turnout		1,45,585	79.26	▼0.93
CPI(M) hold		Swing	▲0.89	

=== 2016 ===
There were 1,77,121 registered voters in the constituency for the 2016 election.

2016 Kerala Legislative Assembly election: Kalliasseri
Party	Candidate	Votes	%	±%
CPI(M)	T. V. Rajesh	83,006	59.83	▲1.21
INC	Amritha Ramakrishnan	40,115	28.91	▼5.73
BJP	K. P. Arun	11,036	7.95	▲3.55
Independent	Sunil Koyilerian	1,455	1.05	−
SDPI	K. Subair	1,435	1.03	▼0.80
WPOI	Sainudeen Karivellur	1,080	0.78	−
NOTA	None of the above	620	0.45	−
Margin of victory		42,891	30.92	▲6.94
Turnout		1,38,747	78.33	▼1.00
CPI(M) hold		Swing	▲1.21	

=== 2011 ===
There were 1,57,384 registered voters in the constituency for the 2011 election.

2011 Kerala Legislative Assembly election: Kalliasseri
Party	Candidate	Votes	%	±%
CPI(M)	T. V. Rajesh	73,190	58.62	
INC	P. Indira	43,244	34.64	
BJP	Sreenath Ravi Varma	5,499	4.40	
SDPI	A. P. Mahmood	2,281	1.83	−
BSP	K. Gopalakrishnan	640	0.51	−
Margin of victory		29,966	23.98	
Turnout		1,24,854	79.33	
CPI(M) hold		Swing		

== See also ==
- Kalliasseri
- Kannur district
- List of constituencies of the Kerala Legislative Assembly
- 2016 Kerala Legislative Assembly election
