= Olayambadi =

Village in Kannur district, Kerala, India

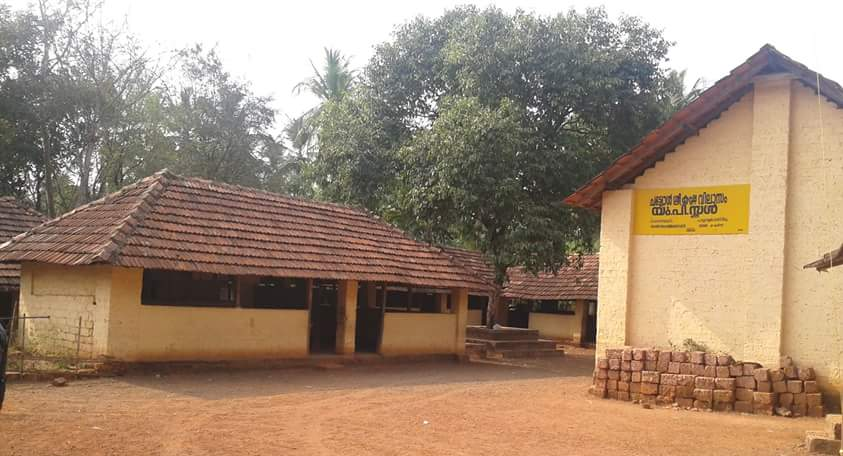
Shreekrishna Vilasam School

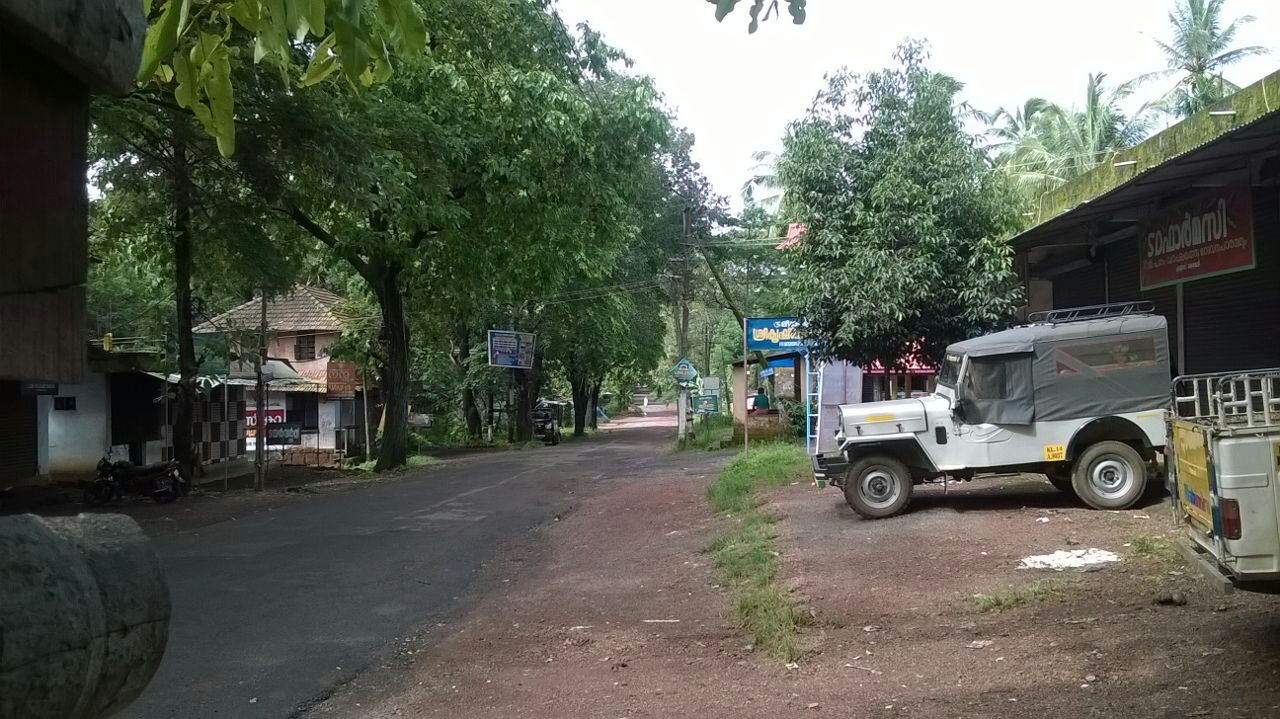
Olayambadi Town

Olayambadi is a small village about 21 km from Payyanur town in the Kannur district of Kerala state, South India.

== Temples ==
The famous Meenkulam Sree Krishna Temple is situated here.Village/hamlet in Payyannur Taluk in Kannur District of Kerala State, India. It comes under Kuttoor Panchayath. It belongs to North Kerala Division. It is located 38 km towards North from District headquarters Kannur. 521 km from State capital Thiruvananthapuram

== Location ==
Olayambadi is surrounded by Taliparamba Taluk towards East, Payyanur taluk towards West, Hosdurg Taluk towards North, Kannur Taluk towards South. Payyannur, Cheruthazham, Kalliasseri, Taliparamba are the nearby Cities to Olayambadi.

→ It is near to Arabian sea. There is a chance of humidity in the weather.

== Language ==
Malayalam is the Local Language here.

== Transportation ==
The national highway passes through Perumba junction. Goa and Mumbai can be accessed on the northern side and Cochin and Thiruvananthapuram can be accessed on the southern side. The road to the east of Iritty connects to Mysore and Bangalore. The nearest railway station is Payyanur on Mangalore-Palakkad line. Trains are available to almost all parts of India subject to advance booking over the internet. There are airports at Kannur, Mangalore and Calicut. All of them are international airports but direct flights are available only to Middle Eastern countries.

== Postal code ==
670306 Olayambadi, 670307 ( Payyanur )

== See also ==
- Mathamangalam
- Kadannappally
- Vellora
- Pilathara
- Pariyaram
- Eramam
