= Kuttur (Kannur) =

Kuttur Kuttoor
- Village
- Location in Kerala, India Kuttur (India)
- Coordinates: 12.1535°N 75.3106°E
- Country: India
- State: Kerala
- District: Kannur
- Taluk: Payyanur

Government
  - Body: Eramam-Kuttur Grama panchayat

Area
  - Total: 22.58 km^{2} (8.72 sq mi)

Population
  - Total: 8,143
  - Density: 360.6/km^{2} (934.0/sq mi)

Languages
  - Official: Malayalam, English
- Time zone: UTC+5:30 (IST)
- PIN: 670306
- Telephone code: 04985
- ISO 3166 code: IN-KL
- Vehicle registration: KL-86
- Literacy: 92.3%
- Niyamasabha constituency: Payyanur
- Lok Sabha constituency: Kasaragod

Kuttur is a village in Payyanur taluk of Kannur district in the Indian state of Kerala.

== Location ==
Kuttur is located 17 km (11 mi) northeast of Payyanur town, 3 km (1.9 mi) northeast of Mathamangalam bazar and 39 km (24 mi) north of Kannur city.

== Educational institutions ==
- Sunrise College of Advanced Studies (SRC), Kuttoor
- Jaybees Training College of B. Ed., Kuttoor
- Government U P School Kuttur

== Demographics ==
As of the 2011 census, Kuttoor village has a population of 8,143, where 3,821 are males and 4,322 females. Kuttur village has an area of 22.58 km^{2} (8.72 sq mi) with 2,022 families. Population in the age group 0–6 is 875 (10.7%), which constitutes 432 males and 443 females. Kuttoor has an overall literacy rate of 92.3%, where male literacy stands at 96.2% and female literacy is 88.9%.

== Transportation ==
The national highway (NH 66) passes through Perumba junction. Goa and Mumbai can be accessed on the northern side and Cochin and Thiruvananthapuram can be accessed on the southern side. The road to the east of Iritty connects to Mysore and Bangalore. The nearest railway station is Payyanur on the Shoranur–Mangalore section under Southern Railway. The nearest airport is Kannur International, about 54 km away.

== See also ==
- Mathamangalam
- Eramam
- Vellora
