= Payyanur taluk =

Tehsil in Kerala, India

Payyanur taluk Payyannur
- Taluk
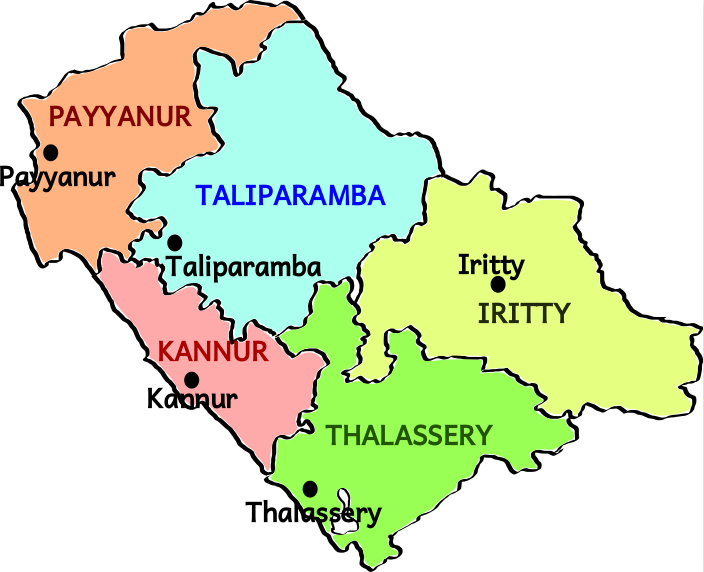
- Taluks of Kannur

- Location in Kerala, India Payyanur taluk (India)
- Coordinates: 12.1535°N 75.3106°E
- Country: India
- State: Kerala
- District: Kannur
- Established: March 2018

Government
  - Type: Taluk
  - Tehsildar: K. Balagopalan

Area
  - Taluk: 513.52 km^{2} (198.27 sq mi)
  - Urban: 155.35 km^{2} (59.98 sq mi)
  - Rural: 358.17 km^{2} (138.29 sq mi)

Population (2011)
  - Taluk: 351,526
  - Density: 684.54/km^{2} (1,773.0/sq mi)
  - Urban: 199,501
  - Urban density: 1,284.2/km^{2} (3,326.1/sq mi)
  - Rural: 152,025
  - Rural density: 424.45/km^{2} (1,099.3/sq mi)

Languages
  - Official: Malayalam, English
- Time zone: UTC+5:30 (IST)
- PIN: 670xxx
- Telephone code: 04985, 0497
- Vehicle registration: KL 86
- Lok Sabha constituency: Kasaragod
- Vidhan Sabha constituency: Payyanur, Kalliasseri

Payyanur taluk comes under Taliparamba revenue division in Kannur district of Kerala, India. Payyanur is one of the 5 taluks in Kannur district established in March 2018 carved out from Taliparamba and Kannur taluks. Payyanur taluk comprises 22 villages including 16 delinked from Taliparamba taluk and 6 from Kannur taluk. It borders Kasaragod district in the north, Taliparamba and Kannur taluk in the south and Karnataka state in the east. Most of the government offices are in Payyanur Mini Civil Station. Payyanur taluk consists of Payyanur Municipality and 11 Panchayats.

== Constituent Villages ==
Payyanur taluk has 22 villages: Alapadamba, Cheruthazham, Eramam, Ezhome, Kadannappalli, Kankole, Karivellur, Korom, Kuttur, Kunhimangalam, Madayi, Panapuzha, Payyanur, Peralam, Peringome, Perinthatta, Pulingome, Ramanthali, Thirumeni, Vayakkara, Vellora and Vellur.
