= Karivellur–Peralam Gram Panchayat =

Panchayat in Kannur district, India

Karivellur-Peralam Grama Panchayat is a rural local body in Kannur district of Kerala, India. There are 2 revenue villages under the panchayat limits named Karivellur and Peralam. The Panchayat is divided into 16 wards.
