= Perumba River =

River in India

Perumba River Peruvamba River
- The Perumba River over Perumba bridge, Payyannur

Location
- Country: India
- States: Kerala
- District: Kannur
- Towns: Payyanur, Mathamangalam, Panapuzha, Kadannappalli

Physical characteristics
- Source: Near Pekunnu hills, Thimiri
  - location: Kannur district, India
- Mouth: Arabian Sea
  - location: Kavvayi Backwaters, India
  - elevation: 0 m (0 ft)
- Length: 51 km (32 mi)

The Perumba River is a 51 km long river which flows through the Payyanur taluk of Kannur district in Kerala, India. The town of Payyannur is situated on the banks of this river subsequently the river is locally known as Payyannur River. It is also known as Peruvamba River in the region near the Western Ghats.

== Course ==
The Perumba River originates in the Pekunnu hills near Thimiri in the hilly eastern part of the Kannur district. The river then flows through several hilly towns of the district namely, Vellora, Palathadathil, Panapuzha, Kuttur and Mathamangalam. Then it enters into the Malabar plains where it flows through the towns of Kadannappally, Kanayi, Kandankaly and Kunhimangalam. After reaching Kunhimangalam, it splits into two distributaries, one flows towards north passing through Payyannur and empties into the Kavvai estuary along with the Kuppam River.The second distributary turns south flowing through Theckumbad, Palakode, Madayi and eventually emptying into the Arabian Sea near the Ezhimala hill.

== Tributaries ==
- Vannathipuzha: This tributary originates from Alakkode-Eramam-Kuttoor region of Western Ghats and flows through Mathamangalam. The Perumba River is also known as Panappuzha near Mathamangalam.
- Kallamkulam Totti/Pangadam Thodu: Two arms of this tributary originate from the east and south side of Kallamkunnu near Echilamvayal. It flows through Thotti and Orikkamvay Vayal. It then flows through Korom and merges with the Perumba River near Kaipad.
