= Kandankali =

Kandankali Kandangali
- village
- Location in Kerala, India Kandankali (India)
- Coordinates: 12°5′6″N 75°12′28″E
- Country: India
- State: Kerala
- District: Kannur

Languages
  - Official: Malayalam, English
- Time zone: UTC+5:30 (IST)
- ISO 3166 code: IN-KL
- Vehicle registration: KL-

Kandankali is a village in Kerala, India. The village is situated about two kilometers south of the town of Payyanur in Kannur district.

== Culture ==
Kandankali has traditionally been the home of progressive movements and forms of traditional, ritualistic arts including Theyyam, Poorakkali and Kolkali. The population of the village is almost entirely Hindu.

== Nature ==
Kandankali is bordered on its east and south side by the Perumba River.

== Temples ==
The Subramanya Swami Temple is near Kandankali. The name Kandankali is formed from the words 'Kandan' and 'Kali', which mean "Lord Shiva and Parvathi" when combined. The Karali Sree Bhadrakali Temple is located at the western border of Kandankali.

== Geography and natural resources ==
The village of Kandankali's traditional industries are fish farming and prawn farming. The Perumba and Kunchimangalam Rivers are located in Kandangali.

== Transportation ==
The national highway passes through Perumba junction. Goa and Mumbai can be accessed on the northern side, while Cochin and Thiruvananthapuram can be accessed on the southern side. The road to the east of Iritty connects to Mysore and Bangalore. The nearest railway station is Payyanur on Mangalore-Palakkad line. There are airports at Kannur, Mangalore and Calicut. All of them are international airports, but direct flights are available only to Middle Eastern countries.
