= Kalavai puthur =

Kalavai puthur k.puthur
- village
- Country: India
- State: Tamil Nadu
- District: Vellore

Area
  - Total: 2 km^{2} (0.77 sq mi)

Population (2011)
  - Total: 2,987
  - Density: 80/km^{2} (210/sq mi)

Languages
  - Official: Tamil
- Time zone: UTC+5:30 (IST)
- PIN: 632506
- Telephone code: 04173
- Vehicle registration: TN 73
- Nearest city: Vellore
- Sex ratio: 1:1.2 ♂/♀
- Literacy: 62%
- Lok Sabha constituency: Arakkonam
- Climate: sunny (Köppen)
- Avg. summer temperature: 35–40 °C (95–104 °F)
- Avg. winter temperature: 20–28 °C (68–82 °F)

Kalavai puthur is a village under the Thimiri panchayat union. It is situated near Kalavai, Vellore district, Tamil Nadu. The village is historically significant for Dharmaraja temple. Villages like Vellambi and Mazhayur are located in the west of Kalavai puthur. Villages like Vembi, Melpulam are located in the south of Kalavai puthur. Agaram village is situated in the north side. The main occupation of the people in this village is Agriculture.
