= T. V. Rajesh =

Indian politician (born 1974)

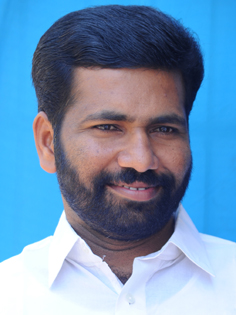

Member of Legislative Assembly, Kerala
- In office 2011–2021
- Succeeded by: M. Vijin
- Constituency: Kalliasseri

Personal details
- Born: 11 January 1974 (age 52) Kulappuram, Cheruthazham, Kannur district, Kerala
- Party: CPI(M)
- Spouse: T P Sheena
- Children: Diya

T. V. Rajesh (born 11 January 1974) is an Indian politician from the state of Kerala, and a former member of the Legislative Assembly of Kerala. He represented the Kalliasseri constituency of Kerala and is a member of the Communist Party of India (Marxist) (CPI(M)). Rajesh was the president of the DYFI Kerala state committee, and also a state committee member of the CPI(M).

== Early life ==
T. V. Rajesh was born to Chandukutty and Madhavi at Kulapuram, Kannur district. He did his schooling in Cheruthazham High School and subsequently completed his pre-degree and bachelor's degree in Political Science from Payyanur College, Kannur. He completed his master's degree in law from Government Law College, Thiruvananthapuram.

== Political career ==
T. V. Rajesh entered into politics as a Students' Federation of India (SFI) activist. Later he moved onto Democratic Youth Federation of India and actively took part in various strikes and movements. He was the president of the DYFI Kerala state committee. His political activism saw him lead student struggles right from his days as a high school student. He has been part of many different struggles against various United Democratic Front governments in Kerala. His struggles have been brutally repressed in the past, which made him spend 87 days behind the bars.

He was elected as the state secretary of SFI in 2002 and as the National Joint Secretary in 2003. He was elected as the member of the Legislative Assembly of Kerala from his constituency in May 2011 with a margin of nearly 30,000 votes. In 2012 Kerala state conference of CPI(M), he was elected as a member of the state committee of the party. He was re-elected from the same constituency in 2016 with a margin of more than 42,000 votes.

== 2016 Kalliasseri election results ==
There were 1,77,121 registered voters in the constituency for the 2016 election.

2016 Kerala Legislative Assembly election : Kalliasseri
Party	Candidate	Votes	%	±%
CPI(M)	T. V. Rajesh	83,006	59.83	▲1.21
INC	Amritha Ramakrishnan	40,115	28.91	▼5.73
BJP	K. P. Arun	11,036	7.95	▲3.55
Independent	Sunil Koyilerian	1,455	1.05	−
SDPI	K. Subair	1,435	1.03	▼0.80
WPOI	Sainudeen Karivellur	1,080	0.78	−
NOTA	None of the above	620	0.45	−
Margin of victory		42,891	30.92	▲6.94
Turnout		1,38,747	78.33	▼1.00
CPI(M) hold		Swing	▲1.21	

== 2011 Kalliasseri election results ==
There were 1,57,384 registered voters in the constituency for the 2011 election.

2011 Kerala Legislative Assembly election : Kalliasseri
Party	Candidate	Votes	%	±%
CPI(M)	T. V. Rajesh	73,190	58.62	
INC	P. Indira	43,244	34.64	
BJP	Sreenath Ravi Varma	5,499	4.40	
SDPI	A. P. Mahmood	2,281	1.83	−
BSP	K. Gopalakrishnan	640	0.51	−
Margin of victory		29,966	23.98	
Turnout		1,24,854	79.33	
CPI(M) hold		Swing		

== Positions held ==
- SFI Cheruthazham unit secretary in 1996
- SFI Madayi area president in 1998
- SFI Kannur district president in 1999
- Calicut University union counselor in 2000
- SFI Kannur district secretary in 2000
- SFI Kerala state secretary in 2002
- Calicut University senate member
- DYFI Kannur district president in 2006
- DYFI Kerala state joint secretary in 2006
- DYFI Kerala state secretary in 2007
- CPI(M) Kannur district committee member in 2007
- Member of Kerala Legislative Assembly in 2011
- CPI(M) Kerala State committee member in 2012
