= Pariyaram =

- Census Town
- Location in Kerala, India Pariyaram (India)
- Coordinates: 12.0732°N 75.2917°E
- Country: India
- State: Kerala
- District: Kannur
- Taluk: Taliparamba

Government
  - Type: Panchayati raj (India)
  - Body: Pariyaram Grama Panchayat

Area
  - Total: 32.68 km^{2} (12.62 sq mi)

Population (2011)
  - Total: 20,405
  - Density: 624.4/km^{2} (1,617/sq mi)

Languages
  - Official: Malayalam, English
- Time zone: UTC+5:30 (IST)
- PIN: 670502, 670503
- ISO 3166 code: IN-KL
- Vehicle registration: KL-59
- Literacy: 93.19
- Lok Sabha constituency: Kannur
- Assembly constituency: Taliparamba

Pariyaram is a Grama Panchayat consisting of two villages viz. Pariyaram census town and Kuttiyeri village. Pariyaram is a suburb of Taliparamba on National Highway (NH 66) between Taliparamba and Payyanur in Kerala state of India. Mini villages of Thiruvattoor, Koran Peedika, Mukkunnu & Chithappile Poyil are parts of Pariyaram.

Even though the Government Medical College, Kannur was formerly known as Pariyaram Medical College, the same is located in Kadannappally- Panapuzha Grama panchayat.

== Educational Institutions ==
- Government Dental college, Pariyaram
- Government Medical College, Kannur
- Government Ayurveda Medical College Kannur
- Oushadhi
- K.K.N.Pariyaram Memorial Government Higher Secondary School

== Demographics ==
As of 2011 census, Pariyaram census town had total population of 20,405 where 9,582 males and 10,823 females with an area spreads over 32.68 km^{2} (12.62 sq mi). Total number of households were 4,580 in the town limits. Population of children in age group 0-6 was 2,519 (12.3%) which constitutes 1,249 males and 1,270 females. Pariyaram town had overall literacy of 93.2% where male literacy was 96.8% and female literacy was 90%.

== Religions ==
As of 2011 Indian census, Pariyaram census town had total population of 20,405 which constitute 9,329 (45.7%) Hindus, 7,818 (38.3%) Muslims, 3,194 (15.7%) Christians and Others (0.3%).

== Administration ==
Pariyaram Panchayat is part of Taliparamba Assembly constituency under Kannur Loksabha constituency.

== Law and Order ==
Pariyaram Medical College Police Station was established on 10 February 2009 adjacent to the Pariyaram Government Medical College situated in Kadannapalli village. The old station building was renovated and inaugurated on 06.03.2022 by Hon’ble Chief Minister of Kerala, Pinarayi Vijayan. The police station is part of Kannur rural police district and has jurisdiction over Kadannappalli, Panapuzha, Cheruthazham and Pariyaram villages with an area of 118.01 Sq kms.

== Transportation ==
The national highway passes through Pariyaram. Mangalore and Mumbai can be accessed on the northern side and Cochin and Thiruvananthapuram can be accessed on the southern side. The road from Taliparamba to the east of Iritty connects to Mysore and Bangalore. It will take approximately 45 minutes by Bus to reach Pariyaram from the district headquarters Kannur. The nearest railway stations are Payangadi and Payyannur on Mangalore-Palakkad line. There are airports at Kannur, Mangalore and Calicut. All of them are international airports but direct flights are available only to Middle Eastern countries.

== See also ==
- Mathamangalam
- Kadannappally
- Vellora
- Olayampadi
- Pilathara
- Eramam
- Kuppam
- Mukkunnu
