= Kanayi =

Village in Kerala, India

- agricultural village
- Location in Kerala, India Kanayi (India)
- Coordinates: 12°06′46″N 75°15′52″E
- Country: India
- State: Kerala
- District: Kannur
- Taluk: Payyanur
- Elevation: 13 m (43 ft)

Languages
  - Official: Malayalam, English
- Time zone: UTC+5:30 (IST)
- Postal code: 670307
- ISO 3166 code: IN-KL
- Vehicle registration: KL-86
- Nearest city: kannur

Kanayi is a village in Kannur district, Kerala, in South India. It is at a distance of 12 km from Payyannur. Vannathi Puzha and Meenkuzhi Dam are very important for its agriculture and fishing.

== Geography ==
Kanayi is located on the northern bank of Perumba River. Its average elevation is at 13 metres above the sea level.

== Climate ==
Kanayi has a tropical monsoon climate (Am) under the Köppen Climate Classification, bordering upon a tropical savanna climate (Aw). Its monsoon season starts in late April and ends in early November. It receives the least amount of rainfall in February, with an average precipitation of 4 millimetres or 0.16 inches; and the most rainfall in June, with an average of 615 millimetres or 24.21 inches.

Climate data for Kanayi
Month	Jan	Feb	Mar	Apr	May	Jun	Jul	Aug	Sep	Oct	Nov	Dec	Year
Mean daily maximum °C (°F)	30.7 (87.3)	31.4 (88.5)	31.7 (89.1)	31.2 (88.2)	30.1 (86.2)	27.4 (81.3)	26.7 (80.1)	26.9 (80.4)	27.8 (82.0)	28.5 (83.3)	29.5 (85.1)	30.1 (86.2)	29.3 (84.8)
Daily mean °C (°F)	25.8 (78.4)	26.8 (80.2)	27.6 (81.7)	27.9 (82.2)	27.4 (81.3)	25.4 (77.7)	24.8 (76.6)	24.8 (76.6)	25.3 (77.5)	25.6 (78.1)	25.9 (78.6)	25.7 (78.3)	26.1 (78.9)
Mean daily minimum °C (°F)	21.9 (71.4)	22.7 (72.9)	24.1 (75.4)	25.2 (77.4)	25.2 (77.4)	24.1 (75.4)	23.6 (74.5)	23.4 (74.1)	23.4 (74.1)	23.4 (74.1)	23.2 (73.8)	23.2 (73.8)	23.6 (74.5)
Average rainfall mm (inches)	5 (0.2)	4 (0.2)	21 (0.8)	83 (3.3)	231 (9.1)	615 (24.2)	555 (21.9)	362 (14.3)	210 (8.3)	230 (9.1)	75 (3.0)	19 (0.7)	2,410 (95.1)
Source: Climate-Data.org

== Plants of Kanayi ==
- Rijuraj M P et al (2017) reported a new endemic plant Rotala kanayensis from the marshy substratum of a drying depression on the lateritic rock surface.
