= Mukkunnu, Taliparamba =

Mukkunnu Mukkun (Malayalam)
- Village
- Location in Kerala, India Mukkunnu (India)
- Coordinates: 12°03′24″N 75°21′1″E
- Country: India
- State: Kerala
- District: Kannur

Languages
  - Official: Malayalam, English
- Time zone: UTC+5:30 (IST)
- PIN: 670502
- ISO 3166 code: IN-KL
- Vehicle registration: KL-59
- Nearest city: Taliparamba
- Lok Sabha constituency: Kannur
- Climate: Tropical rainforest (Köppen: Af)

Mukkunnu (Malayalam: മുക്കുന്ന്) is a village in the Pariyaram Panchayat of Taliparamba Taluk in Kannur district, Kerala, India.

== Overview ==
The name Mukkunnu is believed to have originated from the Malayalam term Moonu Kunnu (മൂന്നു കുന്ന്), meaning "three hills". The village is accessible via the Chudala bus stop on National Highway 17 (NH17) or the North Kuppam bus stop.

== Temples ==
The main temple in Mukkunnu is the Anakeel Bhagavathi temple, located near Kuppam.

The temple is known for its annual Theyyam festival, a traditional ritual art form popular in North Kerala. Theyyam performances at this temple are documented to take place in late January.

Other temples in the village include the Karode Vishnu temple on the western side of Mukkunnu, the Gulikan Sthana, and the Mukkunnu Nagam.

== Public library ==
Mukkunnu's public library hosts a collection of Malayalam literary works. The library played a significant role in many households before widespread internet and modern media access, providing radio (from the late 1970s), television (from the early 1980s), and access to several newspapers and magazines published in Kerala.

== Transportation ==
The national highway passes through Taliparamba. Goa and Mumbai can be accessed from the northern side, while Kochi and Thiruvananthapuram can be accessed from the southern side. Taliparamba has a bus station, and buses are available to all parts of the Kannur district. The road to the east of Iritty connects to Mysore and Bengaluru, but, buses to these cities are available only from Kannur, 22 km (14 mi) to the south.

The nearest railway stations are Kannapuram and Kannur on the Mangaluru-Palakkad line. Trains connect to almost all parts of India, with Pazhayangadi station located around 13 km (8.1 mi) from Mukkunnu.

The closest airports are at Kannur (36 km (22 mi)), Mangaluru (130 km (81 mi)), and Kozhikode (137 km (85 mi)).

== See also ==
- Kuttiyeri
- Thiruvattoor
- Vellavu
- Mavichery
- Theyyam
