= Pallathadka Pramoda Kumari =

Indian materials scientist

- Born: Pallathadka, Kasaragod, Kerala, India
- Occupation: Senior Scientist I

Pallathadka Pramoda Kumari is a Senior Scientist at the Institute of Materials Research and Engineering, Singapore.

She has a number of patents and research publications to her credit.
