= Karivellur Mahadeva Temple =

Hindu temple in Kannur district, Kerala, India

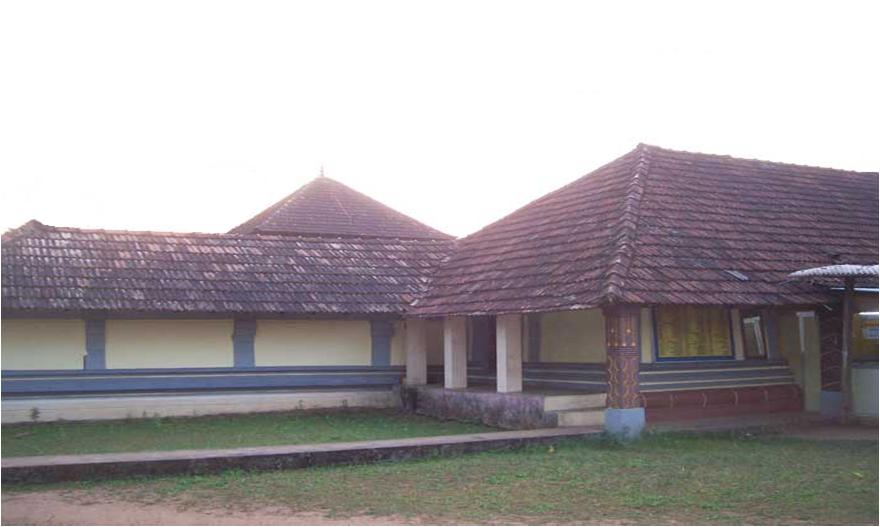
- Mahadeva Temple, Karivellur, Kannur, Kerala

- Kannur, Kerala

Religion
- Affiliation: Hinduism
- District: Kannur
- Deity: Mahadeva
- Festival: Maha Shivaratri

Location
- Location: Karivellur
- State: Kerala
- Country: India
- Coordinates: 12.172963°N 75.190189°E

Architecture
- Type: Architecture of Kerala

Specifications
- Temple: One
- Elevation: 36.78 m (121 ft)

Karivellur Mahadeva Temple or 'Karivellur Shiva Temple' is a Shiva temple situated at Karivellur near Payyanur neighbourhood in Kannur in the state of Kerala, India. This temple was owned by Chitrakkal Kovilakam. It is one of the 108 Shiva Temples.

The temple is located with the coordinates of 12.172963°N 75.190189°E at Karivellur near Payyanur in Kannur district, Kerala.

Karivellur Mahadeva Temple (Kerala)
