= Eramam =

- village
- Location in Kerala, India Eramam (India)
- Coordinates: 12°8′0″N 75°17′0″E
- Country: India
- State: Kerala
- District: Kannur

Government
  - Type: Panchayati Raj (India)
  - Body: Eramam Kuttur Grama Panchayat

Area
  - Total: 21.65 km^{2} (8.36 sq mi)

Population (2011)
  - Total: 9,448
  - Density: 436.4/km^{2} (1,130/sq mi)

Languages
  - Official: Malayalam, English
- Time zone: UTC+5:30 (IST)
- PIN: 670307
- Telephone code: 04985
- ISO 3166 code: IN-KL
- Vehicle registration: KL-86
- Nearest city: Payyanur
- Lok Sabha constituency: Kasaragod
- Vidhan Sabha constituency: Payyanur
- Climate: normal (Köppen)

Eramam is a village in Kannur district in Indian state of Kerala.

== Demographics ==
As of 2011 Census, Eramam had a population of 9,448 with 4,478 males and 4,970 females. Eramam village has an area of 21.65 km^{2} (8.36 sq mi) with 2,425 families. Population in the age group 0-6 was 931 (9.8%) which constitutes 484 males and 447 females. Eramam had overall literacy of 92.5% where male literacy stands at 97.1% and female literacy was 88.5%.

== Transportation ==
The national highway passes through Perumba junction. Goa and Mumbai can be accessed on the northern side and Cochin and Thiruvananthapuram can be accessed on the southern side. The road to the east of Iritty connects to Mysore and Bangalore. The nearest railway station is Payyanur on Mangalore-Palakkad line. Trains are available to almost all parts of India subject to advance booking over the internet. There are airports at Mattanur, Mangalore and Calicut. All of them are international airports but direct flights are available only to Middle Eastern countries.

== See also ==
- Mathamangalam
- Kadannappally
- Vellora
- Olayampadi
- Pilathara
- Pariyaram
