= Pallathadka =

- hamlet
- Location in Kerala, India
- Coordinates: 12°36′52″N 75°4′52″E
- Country: India
- State: Kerala
- District: Kasaragod

Languages
  - Official: Malayalam, Kannada
- Time zone: UTC+5:30 (IST)
- PIN: 671551
- Telephone code: +91-4998 (Peradala exchange, Uppala SDE)
- Vehicle registration: KL 14
- Nearest city: Kasaragod
- Lok Sabha constituency: Kasaragod
- Vidhan Sabha constituency: Kasaragod

Pallathadka is a hamlet in the Badiyadka village of Kasaragod district, Kerala State of India.

== Education ==
School: AUP School Pallathadka (Aided Upper Primary School, Pallathadka): This Upper Primary School is aided and recognized by Government of Kerala. It is bilingual offering both Kannada and Malayalam as mediums of instruction. This school was established in 1927 and it is one of the oldest schools in the district.

== Community Organizations ==
Post Office: Pallathadka has a branch post office and pin code is 671551.

Community Center: Muddu Mandira: A free Community Center built in memory of Late Shri Subraya Bhat, Founder & Headmaster, A U P School Pallathadka.

Anganwadi and family health care center, Pallathadka.

== Temples and places of worship ==
The village has three small temples and two mosques.

Sri Ayyapa Bhajana Mandira, Pallathadka.

Sri Shashtara Temple, Ballambettu (Just One mile from Pallathadka).

Sri Laxmi Narayana Mandira, Pallathadka.

Pallathadka Mosque and Pallathadka Madrasa.

Korikkar Mosque

Korikkar Boothasthana(Just One km from Pallathadka)

Korikkar Vana(Just One km from Pallathadka)

== Clubs ==
Youth Clubs: Green Star ASC, Pallathadka.

Pallathadka has always been an example for religious harmony and brotherhood. Another feature of this hamlet is that each and everybody either belonging or hailing from this hamlet uses the name of the village Pallathadka as their surname.

== Geography ==
A small river passes by Pallathadka which starts at Yethadka, forms the Shiriya River in the middle and merges with the Arabian Sea at Kumbla.

== Notable people ==
- Prakash Kumar Pallathadka is a Professor of Biological Sciences specializing in Plant Development, Tissue Culture, Plant Psychology and Molecular Biology at the Department of Biological Sciences, National University of Singapore (NUS).
- Pallathadka Pramoda Kumari is a Senior Scientist at the Institute of Materials Research and Engineering, Singapore.
