= Karivellur =

Census town in Kerala, India

- Census Town
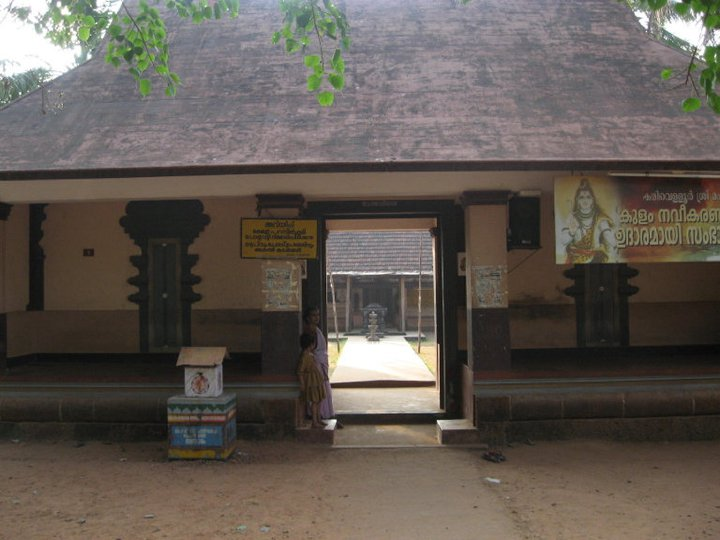
- Karivellur temple

- Location in Kerala, India Karivellur (India)
- Coordinates: 12.173260°N 75.209656°E
- Country: India
- State: Kerala
- District: Kannur
- Taluk: Payyanur

Government
  - Body: Karivellur-Peralam Grama Panchayat

Area
  - Total: 11.33 km^{2} (4.37 sq mi)

Population (2011)
  - Total: 13,498
  - Density: 1,191/km^{2} (3,086/sq mi)

Languages
  - Official: Malayalam, English
- Time zone: UTC+5:30 (IST)
- PIN: 670521
- Telephone code: +91 4985
- ISO 3166 code: IN-KL
- Vehicle registration: KL-86

Karivellur is a census town and a Gram Panchayat in the Kannur district of Kerala state, India.

== Location ==
Karivellur is located 47 km north of the district headquarters, Kannur; 10 km from the taluk headquarters, Payyanur; and 535 km from the state capital, Thiruvananthapuram.

== History ==
=== Karivellur peasant struggle ===
After the Second World War, North Malabar faced severe food scarcity and black marketing. In Karivellur village, peasants who were tenants of the Chirakkal Raja resisted the forced transport of harvested paddy to the landlord's godown. Led by Karshaka Sangham leaders such as A. V. Kunhambu, the farmers demanded that paddy be kept in local cooperative stores and sold at a fair price instead of being diverted to the black market.

On 20 December 1946, the peasants blocked the transport of paddy. A battalion of the Malabar Special Police and regular police arrived at the site. When the unarmed peasants refused to disperse, the police opened fire. Two peasants, Thidil Kannan and Kunhambu, were killed. Following the firing, police cases were registered against 196 people, many were arrested and later sentenced to imprisonment. The Karivellur struggle is considered the first major organized peasant uprising in Kannur district and a precursor to the Kavumbayi struggle.

The struggle is often recalled in connection with veteran communist leader V.S. Achuthanandan, who participated in the early peasant movements of the region.

== Etymology ==
The name Karivellur is derived from the Malayalam word "Karivellon" (കരിവെള്ളോൻ), a local dialect name for the Hindu deity Shiva. The Karivellur Mahadeva Temple is located in the town, and the place associated with Shiva later came to be known as Karivellur.

== Demographics ==
As of 2011 India census, Karivellur census town had population of 13,498 which constitutes 6,252 males and 7,246 females. Karivellur town spreads over an area of 11.33 km^{2} with 3,463 families residing in it. The male female sex ratio was 1000:1159. Population in the age group 0-6 was 1,194 (8.8%) where 575 are males and 619 are females. Karivellur had overall literacy of 95.5% where male literacy stands at 98% and female literacy was 93.4%. Karivellur-Peralam Grama Panchayat consists of Karivellur census town and Peralam village.

== Religion ==
As of 2011 Indian census, Karivellur census town had total population of 13,498, of which Hindus constitute 92.4%, 6.7% Muslims and 0.9% others.

== Transportation ==
NH 66 passes through Karivellur town. Goa and Mumbai can be accessed on the northern side and Cochin and Thiruvananthapuram can be accessed on the southern side. The road to the east of Iritty connects to Mysore and Bangalore. The nearest railway station is Payyanur on Shoranur-Mangalore section under Southern Railway. The nearest airport is Kannur, about 65 km away.

== See also ==
- South Manakkad
