= Mathamangalam =

- Town
- Location in Kerala, India Mathamangalam (India)
- Coordinates: 12.1338°N 75.3005°E
- Country: India
- State: Kerala
- District: Kannur
- Taluk: Payyanur

Government
  - Body: Eramam-Kuttur Grama panchayat

Area
  - Total: 75.14 km^{2} (29.01 sq mi)
- Elevation: 62 m (203 ft)

Population (2011)
  - Total: 27,830
  - Density: 370.4/km^{2} (959.3/sq mi)

Languages
  - Official: Malayalam, English
- Time zone: UTC+5:30 (IST)
- PIN: 670306
- Telephone code: 04985
- ISO 3166 code: IN-KL
- Vehicle registration: KL 86
- Assembly constituency: Payyanur
- Lok Sabha constituency: Kasaragod
- Nearest Railway station: Pazhayangadi (15.5 km); Payyanur (16.5 km)

Mathamangalam or M. M. Bazar is a small town in Kannur district of Kerala state, India. Mathamangalam is a main trading centre, especially for hill products.

== Location ==
Mathamangalam lies 8.5 km (5.3 mi) northeast of Pilathara junction, which is situated on the National Highway 66. It is 14 km (8.7 mi) from the taluk headquarters Payyanur and 36 km (22 mi) from the district headquarters Kannur.

== Education ==
College of Engineering and Technology.

== Post Office ==
There is a post office in the village and it is officially called Mathamangalam Bazar or M.M.Bazar. The pincode is 670306.

== Administration ==
Mathamangalam is part of Eramam-Kuttoor panchayat.

== See also ==
- Kadannappally
- Vellora
- Olayampadi
- Pilathara
- Pariyaram
- Eramam
