= Cheruthazham Kunhiraman Marar =

Indian Chenda player

- Born: P K. Kunhiraman Marar; 20 May 1962 (age 64); Cheruthazham, Kannur district, Kerala, India
- Occupation: percussionist
- Awards: Sangeet Natak Akademi Award (2023); Kerala Kshetra Kala Akademi Award (2019)
- Musical career
- Genre: Traditional Kerala music
- Instrument: Chenda

Cheruthazham Kunhiraman Marar also known as Cheruthazham Kunhirama Marar is an Indian percussionist from Kerala. He is an exponent and teacher in traditional Kerala percussion instrument Chenda. He received many awards including the 2019 Kerala Kshetra Kala Akademi Award from government of Kerala, and the 2023 Sangeet Natak Akademi Award from Sangeet Natak Akademi, government of India.

== Biography ==
Kunhiraman Marar was born on 20 May 1962 in Cheruthazham village in Kannur district of Kerala, to K. V. Krishna Marar and P. K. Janaki Marasyar. He had his primary education at Sriramavilasam LP School and Madayi Govt. Boys High School. At the age of fourteen, he studied traditional percussion instruments at Cherukunnu Annapurneshwari Kalavidyalaya and made his debut in Thayambaka at Annapurneshwari temple in Cherukunnu. In Cheruthazham he studied under Puliyampally Shankara Marar and Kottilaveetil Kunjirama Marar.

Marar's son Anoop Kunhiraman is also a percussionist.

== Career and contributions ==
Marar received training in Chenda from P. Sankara Marar and Pallavoor Maniyan Marar. After that, he did his higher studies at Kottakkal PSV Natyasangham for 3 years.

After training, from 1976 to 1985, he served as a Chenda teacher at Mattanur Panchavadya Sangam and Cherukunnu Astikalaya and in 1985, he became a teacher at the International Kathakali Center in Delhi. After 37 years of service, he retired as the principal in 2022, but continues to be an executive member there.

While in Delhi, Marar started organization called Kshetra Kalavedi for the promotion of Kerala temple musical arts and later a charitable trust was formed in Dilshad Colony, East Delhi, under the name Delhi Panchavadya Trust to promote and train Panchavadyam, a traditional fusion of five instruments. On the model of Thrissur Pooram, Delhi Pooram was organized for five consecutive years with the participation of hundreds of artists.

Marar has presented and led various percussion programs in various states of India and 37 foreign countries. When the Kalaripayattu was organized at the Rashtrapati Bhavan during the visit of Russian President Vladimir Putin to India, Marar composed the background music for it in Chenda. He has worked as the artist coordinator of the official Kerala Plot as part of the Republic Day Parade for seven years.

Marar is a Panel Artist in Indian Council for Cultural Relations, and grade artist in Doordarshan and All India Radio. He is also a member of the National Council of Theyyam Kala Akademi formed under the Cultural Department of the Government of Kerala.

== Awards and honours ==
Marar received many awards including the 2019 Kerala Kshetra Kala Akademi Award from government of Kerala, and the 2023 Sangeet Natak Akademi Award from Sangeet Natak Akademi, government of India. In 2020, the Madras-based Global Human Peace University awarded him a Doctorate in Performing Arts.

Marar's Shashtipurthi (60th birthday) celebration was held in 2022 under the name 'Amritham Ramam', at the Mayura Auditorium in the premises of the Sree Subrahmanya Swamy Temple, Payyannur.
