= Prakash Kumar Pallathadka =

Indian biologist

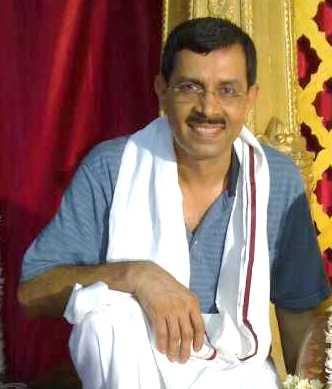
- Pallathadka at a family function
- Born: 8 February; Pallathadka, Kasaragod, Kerala, India
- Occupation: Professor
- Spouse: Nagaratna Prakash
- Children: Ravi (Son), Shashi (Daughter)

Prakash Kumar Pallathadka is a professor of biological sciences specializing in plant development, tissue culture, plant psychology and molecular biology at the Department of Biological Sciences, National University of Singapore (NUS).

== History, education and family ==
He did his Bachelor of Science from University of Mysore with First Class in 1979 and went on to pursue MSc from Madras University in 1981. As an outgoing graduate at Madras University, he won the first rank with first class. His doctoral research was completed in the year of 1988 and he awarded PhD from the University of Calgary, Canada.

He is the first of six children of Pallathadka Venkatramana Bhat & Taradevi. He hails from Pallathadka, a hamlet in Kasaragod district of the State of Kerala in India. He is a Havyaka Brahmin and belongs to the well-known Pallathadka Family. He is married to Nagaratna Prakash and has two children, one son and one daughter.

== Profession ==
He is currently serving as a professor at the Department of Biological Sciences in the main campus of NUS. Ever since joining the National University of Singapore, he has held important positions at various levels.

He is also editor of Plant Cell Reports (from Jan 1999) and Plant Biotechnology Reports (from April 2007) (Both Academic Research Journals published by Springer).

He has a number of patents and research accomplishments to his name. He has also authored a number of books and research papers.
