= South Manakkad =

Village in Kerala, India

South Manakkad 'Thekke Manakkadu' (തെക്കേ മണക്കാട്) is a ward in Karivellur-Peralam panchayat in Kannur in Kerala, India. It is a near to National Highway 66.
