= Peralam (Kannur) =

Village in Kerala, India

- village
- Location in Kerala, India Peralam (India)
- Coordinates: 12.1745°N 75.2100°E
- Country: India
- State: Kerala
- District: Kannur
- Taluk: Payyanur

Government
  - Body: Karivellur-Peralam Grama Panchayat

Area
  - Total: 10.92 km^{2} (4.22 sq mi)

Population (2011)
  - Total: 7,607
  - Density: 696.6/km^{2} (1,804/sq mi)

Languages
  - Official: Malayalam, English
- Time zone: UTC+5:30 (IST)
- PIN: 670521
- Telephone code: +91 4985
- ISO 3166 code: IN-KL
- Vehicle registration: KL-86

Peralam is a village in Payyanur Taluk of Kannur district in the Indian state of Kerala.

== Demographics ==
As of 2011 Census, Peralam village had total population of 7,607 which constitutes 3,548 males and 4,059 females. Peralam village has an area of 10.92 km^{2} (4.22 sq mi) with 1,947 families residing in it. Population of the age group 0-6 was 652 (8.6%) where 322 are males and 330 females. Peralam had overall literacy of 93.6% where male literacy stands at 97.2% and female literacy was 90.5%.

== Transportation ==
The national highway(NH 66) passes through Karivellur town. Goa and Mumbai can be accessed on the northern side and Cochin and Thiruvananthapuram can be accessed on the southern side. The road to the east of Iritty connects to Mysore and Bangalore. The nearest railway station is Payyanur on Shoranur-Mangalore section under Southern Railway. The nearest airport is Kannur, about 65 km away.
