= M. Vijin =

Indian politician

M.Vijin
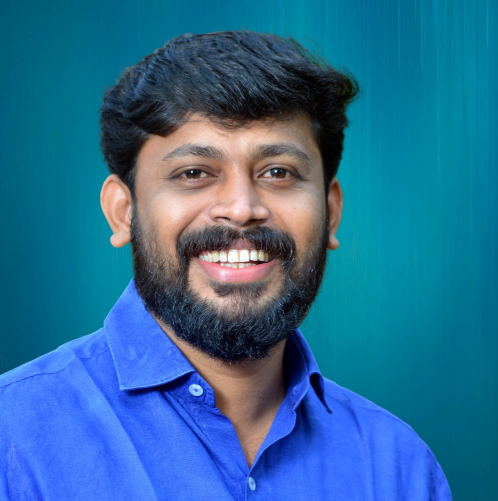

Member of the Kerala Legislative Assembly for Kalliasseri
- Incumbent
- Assumed office May 2021
- Preceded by: T. V. Rajesh

State Secretary, Democratic Youth Federation of India
- Incumbent
- Assumed office 2026

Personal details
- Born: 1 May 1989 (age 37) Payyannur, Kannur
- Party: Communist Party of India (Marxist)
- Spouse: Aswathy Sai Raj
- Parents: Bhaskaran; Vasantha
- Education: Bsc Physics, MA Philosophy
- Alma mater: • Payyanur College • Sree Sankaracharya University of Sanskrit

M. Vijin is an Indian politician from Kerala state. He has been serving as the MLA of Kalliaseri Constituency since May 2021. He is the state Secretary of the Democratic Youth Federation of India (DYFI), Kerala unit. He was the former All India Joint Secretary of Students' Federation of India.

== Life ==
M Vijin was born to Bhaskaran and Vasantha on 1 May 1989. He is a resident of Edat in Payyanur. He completed his schooling from Govt. Boys School in Payyanur and Government Higher Secondary School, Mathamangalam. He completed his graduation in Physics from Payyanur College and Masters in Philosophy from Sree Sankaracharya University of Sanskrit, Payyannur Regional Centre. He married Aswathy Sai Raj, a faculty at St. Joseph College, Pilathara in September 2018.

== Political life ==
=== Student politics ===
M Vijin started his organizational life through Balasangham, the largest children group in the world. He started organizing children in Edat region in Madayi, Kannur in 1996. After holding unit level, area-level and district leadership of Balasangham, he was elected as the State Secretary of the organisation in 2011.

In 2000, M Vijin joined the Students' Federation of India while studying in class 8 at Govt. Boys School in Payyanur. His active engagement in student politics made him the unit president of the SFI school committee in Govt. Boys School in Payyanur. He then became the Area Joint Secretary and later the Area President of SFI at Madayi, Kannur. In his college days, he held both organizational and student union responsibilities. He was the chairman of Payyannur College, Kerala, during 2008–2009. Vijin later got elected as the district president of the Kannur committee and later enjoyed its secretaryship. In 2015, he became the State Secretary of SFI in Kerala. He was also elected as the All India Joint Secretary of SFI at the 15th All India Conference held in Sikar on 22–25 January 2016. He remained in office till 2018.

In 2015, under the leadership of M Vijin, Students’ Federation of India (SFI) took to Kerala's streets in protest, often following violent clashes with the police, against the deadly delay in the distribution of SCERT textbooks in government and aided schools in the state. In 2015, even after the first quarterly exams, which are usually held before the Onam festival, the textbooks were out of reach for students. Vijin wanted the government to order a comprehensive inquiry into the textbook issue and the alleged corruption involved in printing the books in a private press. The then education minister P.K. Abdu Rabb was heavily charged by SFI on textbook issue, and around 40 students were arrested by police for participating in the series of agitations across the state. SFI leaders including M Vijin, VP Sanu and Jaick C Thomas were injured in this month long struggle. They also photocopied and printed SCERT textbooks and distributed them in various schools across the state, inviting public appreciation. Vijin's leadership was crucial in defeating the proposal for introducing foreign private universities in the state in 2016. SFI conducted massive protest rally in front of the Global Education Meet at the Leela Convention centre at Kovalam, Trivandrum. SFI alleged it was an attempted commercialisation of higher education.

He was the subject of controversy after the SFI March to Sri Vellappally Natesan College of Engineering, Kattachira in 2017. The protest march was organized by SFI after a second year student attempted suicide over management harassment, and the college was vandalised by enraged students. He played a crucial role in the Justice for Jishnu Pranoy movement. The student protest over the suicide of an 18-year-old computer science student at Nehru College in Pampady near Thiruvilwamala took a violent turn with the protest march on the college by SFI ending up in rampaging its office and canteen and an ATM counter at its gate. The student had hung himself inside his hostel room after invigilator Praveen, who is also a teacher at the Nehru college, allegedly threatened him by barring from examinations. He strongly voiced against the high rate of annual tuition fee for MBBS course in private medical colleges. He took up "Say No to Ragging" campaigns throughout the state. In the academic year 2017–18, SFI won 127 out of 132 colleges in Mahatma Gandhi (MG) University, 124 colleges out of a total of 170 colleges in Calicut University and all the seats in Kannur University Students Union. His leadership paved way for SFI to win all university students unions in Kerala.

Vijin was part of the Student Politician Delegation to United Kingdom along with 9 other student leaders from India, organised by the British High Commission, New Delhi in 2016. He was a delegate from India to World Festival of Youth and Students held at Sochi, Russia on 14 to 22 August 2017.

=== Youth politics ===
He started his youth activism through Democratic Youth Federation of India. He was part of the DYFI Edat committee in Madayi, Kannur. He has held the local leadership of DYFI, during 2004–5. Thereafter, he worked in both zonal and block committee's of DYFI. In 2013, he was elected to the district committee of DYFI in Kannur. In 2015, he was elected to the state committee of DYFI and became the State Vice President of the committee in 2018. He got elected as a central committee member of the Democratic Youth Federation of India (DYFI) in February 2021.

After the suicide of K.S. Swapna, the manager of Canara Bank at Kuthuparamba in Kannur district on April 9, 2021, Vijin led DYFI protest march to Canara Bank Kuthuparamba unit against the workers exploitation and high work pressure culture in banking sector. He said "while the Modi government is not keen on recovering huge loans taken by corporate companies, bank officers and managers are penalised if they fail to recover small loans from the common people." He opposed the policy of unbridled mergers and privatisation in the banking sector.

=== Party politics ===
He is a district committee member of the CPI(M) in Kannur, Kerala.

2021 Assembly Election

Vijin contested the 2021 Kerala State Assembly Election from Kalliasseri constituency, as a CPI(M) candidate. He recorded a winning margin of 44,393 votes and polled 60.62% total votes polled. He was the youngest in the list of candidates announced by the CPI(M) in Kannur for the assembly polls.

Kalliasseri (State Assembly constituency)
2021 Result Status
	Candidate	Party	Total votes	% of votes
1	M Vijin	Communist Party of India (Marxist)	88252	60.62
2	Adv. Brijesh Kumar	Indian National Congress	43859	30.13
3	Arun Kaithapram	Bharatiya Janata Party	11365	7.81
4	Faizal Madayi	Welfare Party Of India	1169	0.8
5	Brijeshkumar M	Independent	274	0.19
6	NOTA	None of the Above	666	0.46
	Total		145585	
