= Yethadka =

- Hamlet
- Location in Kerala, India Yethadka (India)
- Coordinates: 12°36′11″N 75°7′27″E
- Country: India
- State: Kerala
- District: Kasaragod

Languages
  - Official: Kannada, Malayalam, English
- Time zone: UTC+5:30 (IST)
- PIN: 671551
- Telephone code: +91-4998 (Peradala exchange, Uppala SDE)
- Vehicle registration: KL 14
- Nearest city: Kasaragod
- Lok Sabha constituency: Kasaragod
- Vidhan Sabha constituency: Kasaragod

Yethadka is a hamlet in the Kumbadaje village of Kasaragod district, Kerala State of India.

== Education ==
School: AUPS School Yethadka (Aided Upper Primary School, Yethadka).

== Landmarks ==
Post Office: Yethadka has a branch post office and pin code is 671551.
