= Thimiri =

Thimiri Thripuri
- village
- Location in Kerala, India
- Coordinates: 12°12′0″N 75°23′10″E
- Country: India
- State: Kerala
- District: Kannur

Area
  - Total: 47.3 km^{2} (18.3 sq mi)

Population (2011)
  - Total: 18,044
  - Density: 381/km^{2} (988/sq mi)

Languages
  - Official: Malayalam, English
- Time zone: UTC+5:30 (IST)
- PIN: 670581
- ISO 3166 code: IN-KL
- Vehicle registration: KL-59
- Lok Sabha constituency: Kannur
- Vidhan Sabha constituency: Taliparamba

Thimiri is a village in Kannur district in the Indian state of Kerala. An ancient Shiva temple called Thimiri Sree Shiva Kshethra is situated here.

== Demographics ==
As of 2011 Census, Thimiri had total population of 18,044 which constitutes 8,825 males and 9,219 females. Thimiri village spreads over an area of 47.3 km^{2} (18.3 sq mi) under Chapparapadavu and Alakode Panchayats with 4,497 families residing in it. The sex ratio of Thimiri was 1044 lower than state average of 1084. In Thimiri, 9.5% of the population was under 6 years of age. Thimiri had overall literacy of 94.3% where male literacy stands at 96.7% and female literacy was 92%.

== Thimiri Sree Shiva temple ==
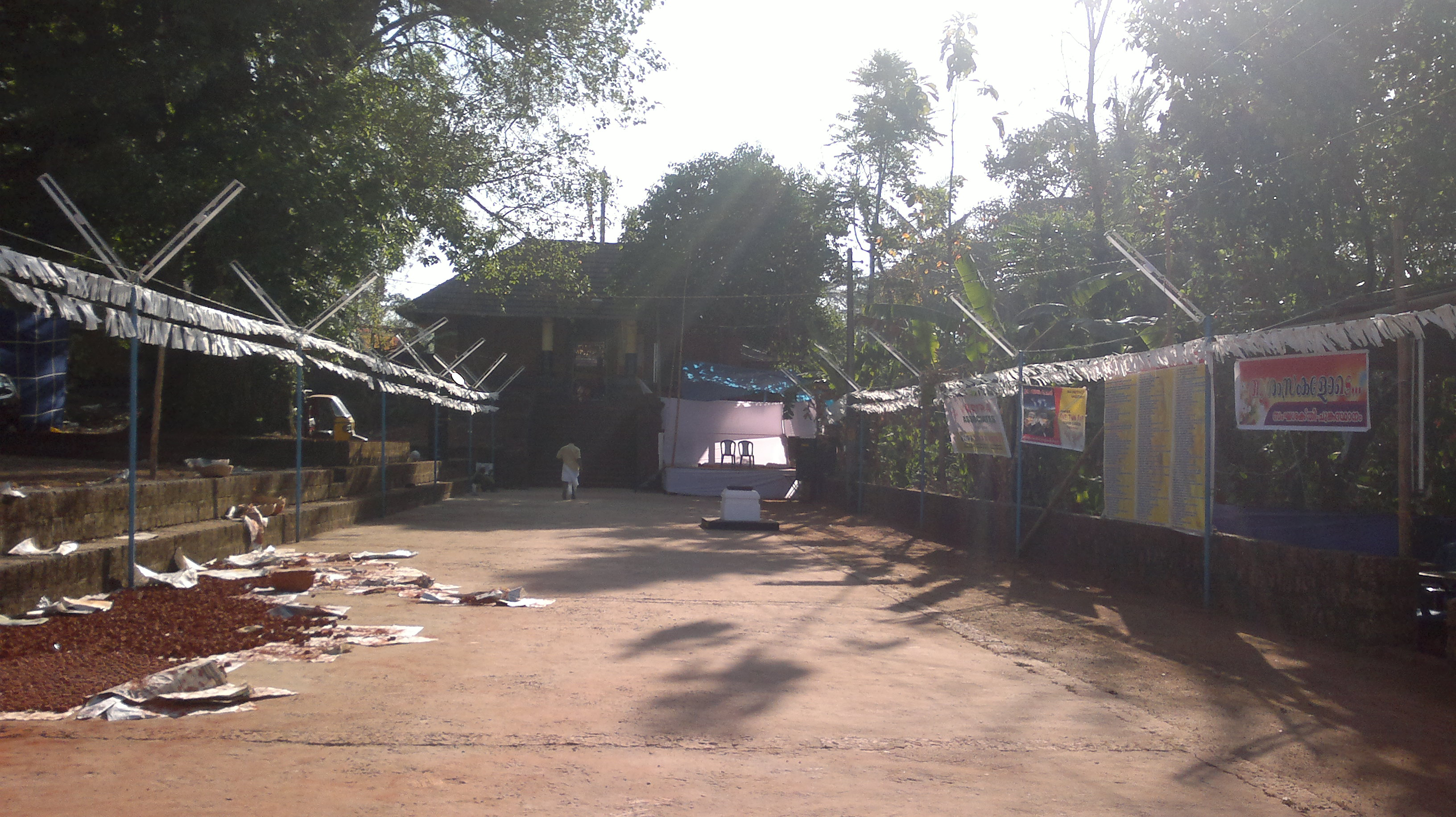
Thimiri Temple

This is the family temple of Kumazhi Kizhakkiniyil and Pulukkool Tharavadu. A very ancient Shiva temple, it is believed that Lord Shiva sat in meditation at Thimiri after Tripura Dahanam (Annihilation of Tripura-the abode of Asuras, the Evil Forces ). It was renovated between 1943 & 1946 by Kumazhi Chattukutty Nambiar, whose nephew, an Ayurvedic physician, Vaidya Visharad Dr. K K C Nambiar, now resides with his family at the historic township of Barkur, the land of 365 temples.

== Transportation ==
The national highway passes through Perumba junction. Goa and Mumbai can be accessed on the northern side and Cochin and Thiruvananthapuram can be accessed on the southern side. The road to the east of Iritty connects to Mysore and Bangalore. The nearest railway station is Payyanur on Mangalore-Palakkad line. Trains are available to almost all parts of India subject to advance booking over the internet. There are airports at Kannur, Mangalore and Calicut. All of them are international airports but direct flights are available only to Middle Eastern countries.
