= Mavichery =

Mavichery (Thaliparamba)
- village
- Country: India
- State: Kerala
- District: Kannur

Languages
  - Official: Malayalam, English
- Time zone: UTC+5:30 (IST)
- PIN: 670142
- ISO 3166 code: IN-KL
- Vehicle registration: KL-13, KL-59
- Nearest city: Taliparamba, Kannur
- Literacy: 90%
- Lok Sabha constituency: Kannur

Mavichery is a village which is the part of Pariyaram Gramapanchayath in the Kannur district of Kerala, India.

== Landmarks ==
The attractions of the village are the Mavichery Narasimhamurthi Temple, Payatiyal Bagavathi Kshethram, sree Aiwar Paradevatha kshetram Mavichery, Sree Muthappan Madapura, Uppalam Para, Ayyapan Kavu, Mavichery GLP School, Arakale valapil theyyam devasthanam, puthiya bhagavathi temple, kaalipoyil sree muthappan madapura, karinchaamundi kshetram pottan theyyam kshetram, mavichery Juma masjid and Sunni masjid.

== Educational Institutions ==
- Government LP School Mavichery
- Mavichery Anganavadi 1
- Mavichery Anganavadi 2
- Taliparamba Arts and Science college is situated near to Mavichery.
- Taliparamba Commercial institute is also situated near to Mavichery.

== Facilities ==
- JKV Arts and Sports club Mavichery

one of the oldest sports club in kannur district.

- Mavichery reading room and library

one of the biggest library in pariyaram gramapanchayath.

- Taliparamba Arts and Science college is situated near to Mavichery
- Mavichery anganavadi 1
- Mavichery anganavadi 2
- Government LP school Mavichery

one of the oldest school in kerala

- CPIM office
- Mavichery Juma masjid

one of the biggest masjid in kannur district.

- Mavichery Sunni masjid

one of the oldest masjid in kannur district.

- AKG memorial vayanashala and granthalayam

one of the oldest vayanashala in kannur district.

- Primary Health Centre

It is the only health centre in pariyaram gramapanchayath.

== Temples ==
- Mavichery shree Narasimhamurthy Temple

The deity here is Narasimhamurthy an avatar of lord vishnu.

- Mavichery muthappan madapura

Here Muthappan and Thiruvappan is worshipped. This is the oldest Muthappan Madapura in the village.

- Ayyapan Kavu Mavichery

Swami Ayyapan is the lord here. This is the oldest Ayyapan temple in the village.

- Mavichery Sree payatiyal bhagavathi kshetram

The god here is shree Payatiyal bhagavathi. Out of 7 payatiyal bhagavathi temples in Kerala, Mavichery Payatiyal bhagavathi temple is the oldest and is known to be biggest. It is at no 1 position.

- Mavichery Sree Arakale valapil theyyam devasthanam

One of the ancient and famous temple in Kerala. It is almost 700 years old temple and is known to be one of the oldest temple in Kerala.

- Kaalipoyil sree muthappan madapura, Mavichery

This is the second muthappan madapura in Mavichery.

- Mavichery Sree Karinchamundi kshetram

The deity here is Sree Karinchamundi Amma.

- Mavichery Sree Pottan theyyam devasthanam(Changanar Tharavadu)

The god here is Sree Pottan Theyyam. Sree Pottan theyyam is one of the powerful Gods.

- Mavichery Sree puthiya bhagavathi Temple

The god here is Sree Puthiya Bhagavathi. And it is one of the oldest Temple in Kannur District.

- Mavichery Sree Thondachan devasthanam

Here lord Thondachan is worshipped and this god is known to be one of the oldest theyyam forms in Kerala.

Mavichery is a place which holds a distinct name in the history of Kerala. A land blessed by nature and moreover is a homely location. The literacy rate is as the case for whole Kerala. One can find people from Mavichery who work in various Arabian countries like UAE, Saudi Arabia Kuwait, Qatar. Most men of Mavichery serves the Indian defense forces like the Indian Army, Border Security Force.

== Tourist Attractions ==
- Uppalam Para
- Danger Point
- Mavichery Narasimhamurthy temple
- Arakale valappil theyyam devasthanam
- Mavichery Juma Masjid
- Mavichery Illam

== Transportation ==
The national highway passes through Taliparamba town. Goa and Mumbai can be accessed on the northern side and Cochin and Thiruvananthapuram can be accessed on the southern side. Taliparamba has a good bus station and buses are easily available to all parts of Kannur district. The road to the east of Iritty connects to Mysore and Bangalore. But buses to these cities are available only from Kannur, 22 km to the south. The nearest railway stations are Kannapuram and Kannur on Mangalore-Palakkad line. Trains are available to almost all parts of India subject to advance booking over the internet. There are airports at Kannur, Mangalore and Calicut. All of them are small international airports with direct flights available only to Middle Eastern countries.

== Climate ==
Summer max 33 °C, min 27 °C

Winter max 29 °C, min 23 °C

Rainfall: like other places in Kerala(June to September).
