= Kunhimangalam =

- Census Town
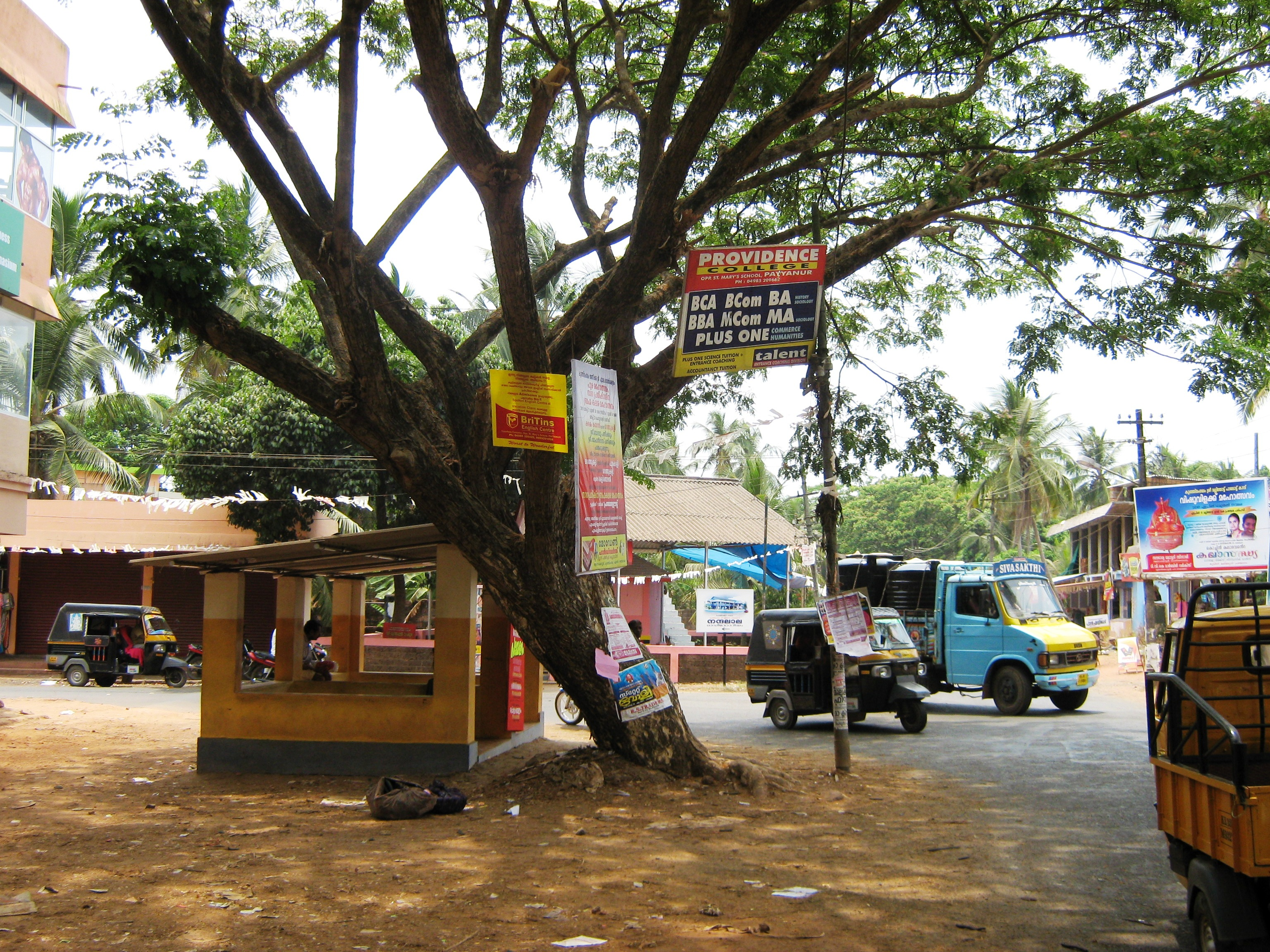
- Kunhimangalam Junction

- Location in Kerala, India Kunhimangalam (India)
- Coordinates: 12°3′10″N 75°14′20″E
- Country: India
- State: Kerala
- District: Kannur

Government
  - Type: Panchayati raj (India)
  - Body: Kunhimangalam Grama Panchayat

Area
  - Total: 15.34 km^{2} (5.92 sq mi)

Population (2011)
  - Total: 18,965
  - Density: 1,236/km^{2} (3,202/sq mi)

Languages
  - Official: Malayalam, English
- Time zone: UTC+5:30 (IST)
- PIN: 670309
- Vehicle registration: KL-86

Kunhimangalam is a census town situated in the northern coastal part of Kannur District in Kerala state on the outskirt of Payyanur. The population in 2011 was around 19,000 including Hindus, Christians and Muslim residents. The village lies in an agricultural region.

== History ==
The local myth of the origin of Kunhimangalam is that a Namboodiri family known as "Kunhaangalam Taravadu" were the village leaders. They ruled the village in an acceptable manner but over the time the family line ended, there was only a mother and son left. One day, the mother and son went to the Kaveri river to pray for their deceased relatives. On their way back to the village, they saw from the Gadikuzhi hills some soldiers of the ruler of Chirakkal town taking Kunhimangalam. The mother and son ended their life in fire. The mother emerged as the Goddess "Veerachamundi" and the son as the God "Veeran". The local people built a temple, the "Kunhimangalam Molom" at the site of the "tharavad" (ancestral home).

Furthermore, some recent myths say that a ruler wanted to hide his ornaments while being chased by enemies. He arrived at this location and discovered an ideal spot to hide his ornaments. He concealed his ornaments in a small mud pot known as "Kunji Man Kalam". Over the years, "Kunji Man Kalam" evolved into "Kunhimangalam," which is sometimes pronounced as "Kunjongalam" when spoken quickly, although that pronunciation is incorrect.

An early ruler in the area of Kunhimangalam was Ezhimannan of Ezhimala. In Sangam literature, the area was called "Ezhil Malai" meaning "high hillock". Other terms have included "Elimala", "Mooshika Sailam", "Sapta Sailam", "Mount Eli" and "Mount the Eli".

From the 6th century CE to the 11th century CE, Kunhimangalam lay in the lands of the Mushika Kingdom. Those were the years of economic stability. The Ezhimala port came into existence. The Ezhimala hills were known for their rare medicinal herbs that had with mythological significance. Some say the mythogical Sanjeevani (plant) herb is found here. According to mythological stories, it is believed that Lord Hanuman had passed over here while carrying the mountain with sanjeevani for Rama and Lakshmana at Lanka, a chunk fell there. The chunk separated into seven parts and fell. Thus formed seven hills or Ezhimala Carved stone pillars, prehistoric stone forms, burial chambers, caves and granite platforms are visible at the foot of the hills. Sailors came to Ezhimala for the beach and views from the hills. A lighthouse was built at nearby Mount Dili.

The western approach to Kunhimangalam is called "Changoorichal" after a Chinese ship, the Changu which visited the area in the 12th century CE. The 13th century CE merchant traveler, Marco Polo (1254 - 1324) recorded the place name "Ezhimala".

In 1962, the village of Kunhimangalam was granted its own panchayat (local council). The council met in a rented building in Theru. The first council chairman was U. Kunhiraman who held office for twenty-four years. administered the panchayat for more than 24 years. A recent council chairman is M. Kunhiraman.

== Location ==
Kunhimangalam is located in the northern part of Kerala state on the south-eastern outskirts of Payyanur. The village lies on the south shore of the Perumba River. The village lies on National Highway 66 The village's railway station is the Ezhimala station. The nearest cities to Kunhimangalam are payyannur (8 km) Mangalore (114 km) and Kannur (31 km).

== Demographics ==
As of 2011 Census, Kunhimangalam had population of 18,965, of which 8,438 (44.5%) are males and 10,527 (55.5%) are females. Kunhimangalam census town has an area of 15.34 square kilometres (5.92 sq mi) with 2,606 families residing in it. The sex ratio was 1,248 females to 1,000 males which is higher than state average of 1,084. 10.37% of the population were children under six years. Kunhimangalam had overall literacy of 94.4% higher than state average of 94%. The male literacy stands at 97.3% and female literacy was 92%.

== Religion ==
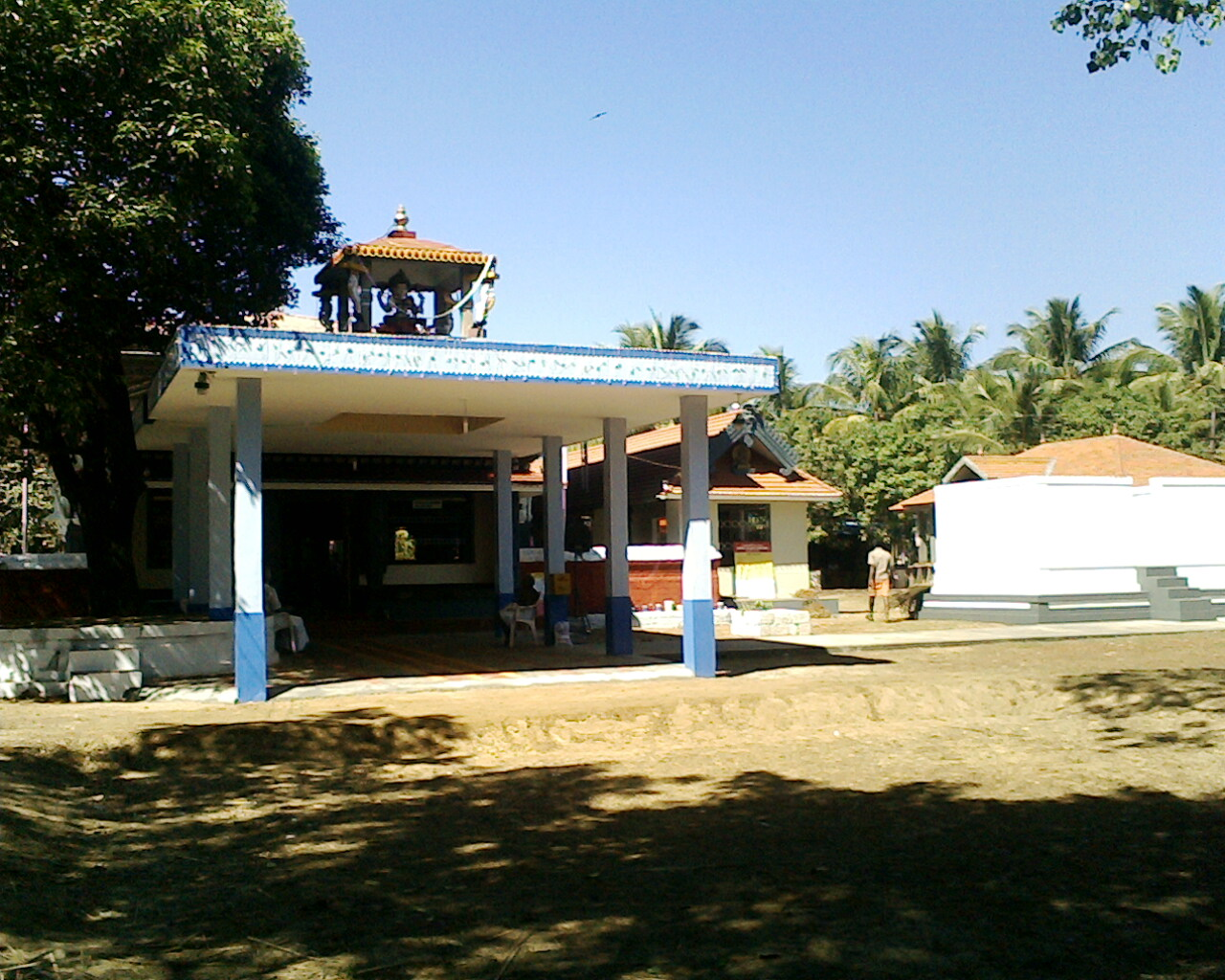
Aneekkara Temple, Kunhimangalam

Malliyot Palott Kavu

As of 2011 Indian census, Kunhimangalam census town had total population of 18,965, of which 14,874 (78.4%) are Hindus, 3,726 (19.6%) are Muslims, 335 (1.8%) are Christians and 0.16% others.

Kunhimangalam is home to Hindus, Muslims and Christians. There are two main churches in the village, at Kovvappuram and the Capuchin Church at Edat. The main mosque is the Jamayeth Mosque. The two main Hindu temples is the Veerachamundeshwari temple and Malliyot Palot Kavu. Hindu Thiyya community leading population in this region, There are also temples such as Sree Muthappan, the deity of the common man, Sree Trippanikkara Shiva Kshetra and the Aneekkara Poomala Bhagavathi Temple.

== Temples ==
- Anikara
- Ayyankoolam
- Veerachamundeshwari(Moloth) temple
- sree malliyotte pallottu kavu
- Kadamkot Makkam bagavathi temple

== Economy ==
The village is the centre of a fertile agricultural region. There are paddy fields, coconut trees, cashew nut trees and areca nuts plants. Other sources of employment are Beedi-cigar works, weaving, earthen ware pottery (at Koyappara). Clothes are made at Saliya theru (weavers' market), and bronze vessels such as lamps and sculptures at Moosarikkovval. The Moosharies (Bronzesmiths) make excellent art ware from bronze. Fish are caught in the Pullankode river.

== Education ==
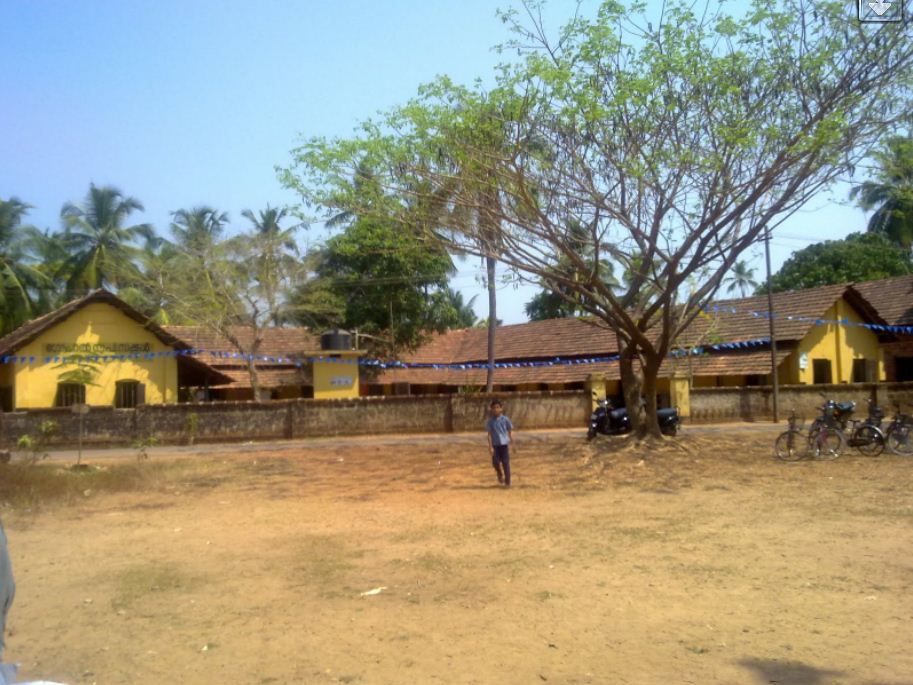
Gopal School, Kunhimangalam

Kunhimangalam has seen changes in education related to the Indian nationalist movement and the Indian agricultural movement. In 2011, at the Indian census, the rate of literacy in the village was 94.39 percent. The rate in women was 92.09 percent.

The schools in the village include:

- Government Lower Primary School. The first school in Kunhimangalam
- GHSS KUNHIMANGALAM
- Edanad West Lower Primary School
- Edanad Upper Primary School
- Gopal Upper Primary School
- Kendriya Vidyalaya

== See also ==
- Payyannur
- Valiyaparamba Backwaters 15 km from Payyanur
- Peringome 20 km from Payyanur
- Ezhimala 12 km from Payyanur Town
- Kavvayi Island 3 km from Payyanur
- Ramanthali 7 km from Payyanur
- Karivellur 10 km from Payyanur
- Trikarpur 6 km from Payyanur
