= Peringome =

- Town
- Location in Kerala, India Peringome (India)
- Coordinates: 12°13′25″N 75°18′50″E
- Country: India
- State: Kerala
- District: Kannur

Government
  - Type: Panchayat Raj
  - Body: Peringome–Vayakkara Grama Panchayat

Area
  - Total: 41.81 km^{2} (16.14 sq mi)

Population (2011)
  - Total: 16,721
  - Density: 399.9/km^{2} (1,036/sq mi)

Languages
  - Official: Malayalam, English
- Time zone: UTC+5:30 (IST)
- PIN: 670 353
- Telephone code: 04985
- ISO 3166 code: IN-KL
- Nearest city: Payyanur (21 km)
- Lok Sabha constituency: Kasaragod
- Vidhan Sabha constituency: Payyanur

Peringome is a revenue village and grama panchayat in Kannur district in the Indian state of Kerala.

== Location ==
Peringome is located on the Payyanur–Rajagiri major district road, about 21 kilometres (13 mi) north-east of Payyanur and 10 kilometres (6 mi) south-west of Cherupuzha. Other roads include Cheruthazham–Kuttur–Peringome road which connects it with the towns of Pilathara and Mathamangalam and Peringome–Cheemeni–Cheruvathur road which connects it with the towns of Cheemeni, Cheruvathur and Kanhangad.

The nearest railway stations are Cheruvathur and Payyanur, about 21 kilometres (13 mi) and 24 kilometres (15 mi) respectively.

== Demographics ==
As per the 2011 Census of India, Peringome revenue village had a total population of 16,721, with 8,751 males and 7,970 females, living in 3,755 households. The population of children aged 0-6 is 1,663, which makes up 9.95% of the total population. The average sex ratio of the village is 911, lower than the Kerala state average of 1,084, and the child sex ratio is 875.

Peringome has a literacy rate of 92.53%, lower than the Kerala average of 94%. Male literacy stands at 96.12% while female literacy is 88.60%.

== Educational Institutions ==
- Government College, Peringome
- Government ITI, Peringome
- Kendriya Vidyalaya, CRPF Peringome
- Govt. Higher Secondary School, Peringome
- San Jose English Medium School, Madakampoyil
- Govt. UP School, Aravanchal
- Nhekkli ALP School

== CRPF Recruit Training Centre ==
Peringome is home to a Recruit Training Centre (RTC) of the Central Reserve Police Force (CRPF). The centre was initially set up on a temporary basis at Pallippuram, Thiruvananthapuram in June 1986 and was later moved permanently to Peringome after the Government of Kerala allotted 275 acres of land in December 2000. The facility can train up to 1,500 recruits at a time, offering 44 weeks of basic training in weapons handling, tactics, fieldcraft and counter-insurgency operations for deployment in anti-Maoist and internal security duties across the country. In 2016–17, it was recognised as the best training institution among all CRPF training centres in India.

== Healthcare ==
Peringome is primarily served by the Peringome Government Taluk Hospital, a secondary-level government hospital serving Peringome and surrounding panchayats. In February 2026, a new 23,700-square-foot hospital block was constructed at a cost of ₹8 crore to upgrade the facility. However, due to pending regulatory safety clearances for the new building, inpatient services officially resumed operations out of the older hospital wing in October 2026.
