= Kadannappalli =

- Census Town
- Location of Kadannappalli in Kerala
- Coordinates: 12.096689°N 75.285186°E
- Country: India
- State: Kerala
- District: Kannur
- Taluk: Payyanur

Government
  - Type: Panchayati raj (India)
  - Body: Kadannappalli-Panapuzha Grama Panchayat

Area
  - Total: 18.08 km^{2} (6.98 sq mi)

Population (2011)
  - Total: 10,430
  - Density: 576.9/km^{2} (1,494/sq mi)

Languages
  - Official: Malayalam, English
- Time zone: UTC+5:30 (IST)
- PIN: 670504
- Vehicle registration: KL-86

Kadannapalli is a census town in Kannur district of Kerala state, India.

== Location ==
Kadannappalli is located 33 km north of Kannur city on the Mangalore road.

== Post office ==
There is a post office in the village and the pin code is 670504.

== Administration ==
Kadannappalli census town is part of Kadannappalli-Panappuzha Panchayat in Payyannur Taluk and Kalliasseri Block. Kadannappalli is politically part of Kalliasseri Assembly constituency under Kasaragod Loksabha constituency.

== Demographics ==
As of 2011 Census, Kadannappalli had a population of 10,430, of which 4,848 are males while 5,582 are females. The sex ratio was 1151 females to 1000 males. Kadannappalli census town has an area of 18.08 km^{2} (6.98 sq mi) with 2,606 families residing in it. In Kadannappalli, 10.5% of total population were under 6 years age. The literacy rate of Kadannappalli was 93.27% lower than state average of 94%.

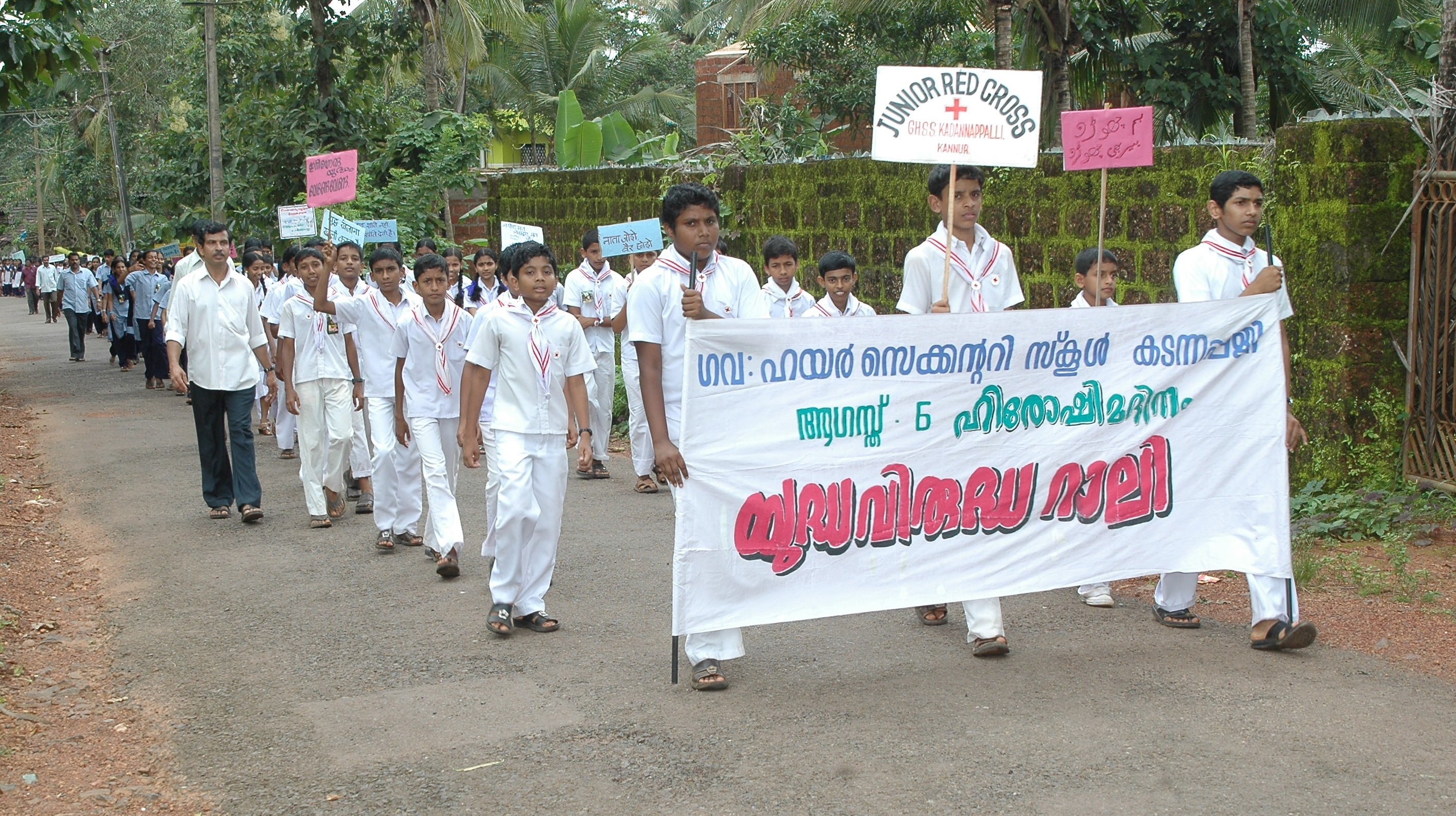
Anti War Rally at Kadannappalli

== Religion ==
As of 2011 Indian census, Kadannappalli census town had a total population of 10,430, which constitutes 80% Hindus, 12.6% Muslims, 7.1% Christians and 0.3% others.

Vellalath Siva Temple is one of the famous pilgrimage centres in the village. The temple has an old Malayalam inscription near the temple pond. There is another pond in front of the temple. The climax scene of the Enkilum Chandrike movie is shot near the temple compound.

Kadannappali

== See also ==
- Mathamangalam
- Vellora
- Olayampadi
- Pilathara
- Pariyaram
- Eramam
