= Panapuzha =

- village
- Location in Kerala, India Panapuzha (India)
- Coordinates: 12.134280°N 75.300580°E
- Country: India
- State: Kerala
- District: Kannur

Area
  - Total: 35.57 km^{2} (13.73 sq mi)

Population (2011)
  - Total: 11,355
  - Density: 319.2/km^{2} (826.8/sq mi)

Languages
  - Official: Malayalam, English
- Time zone: UTC+5:30 (IST)
- ISO 3166 code: IN-KL

Panapuzha is a village in Kannur district in the Indian state of Kerala.

== Demographics ==
As of 2011 Census, Panapuzha village had a population of 11,355 which constitutes 5,398 (47.5%) males and 5,957 (52.5%) females. Panapuzha village spreads over an area of 35.57 km^{2} (13.73 sq mi) with 2,701 families residing in it. The male female sex ratio was 1,104 higher than state average of 1,084. In Panapuzha, 10.2% of the population were children under 6 years age. Panapuzha had overall literacy of 91.9% higher than national average of 59% and lower than state average of 94%. The male literacy stands at 96.3% and female literacy was 88%.

== Transportation ==
The national highway passes through Pariyaram. Goa and Mumbai can be accessed on the northern side and Cochin and Thiruvananthapuram can be accessed on the southern side. The road to the east of Iritty connects to Mysore and Bangalore. The nearest railway station is Payyanur on Mangalore-Palakkad line. Trains are available to almost all parts of India subject to advance booking over the internet. There are airports at Kannur, Mangalore and Calicut. All of them are international airports but direct flights are available only to Middle Eastern countries.
