= Places of worship in Kannur district =

These are notable places of worship in Kannur district. Kannur District is one of the 14 districts in the state of Kerala, India. The town of Kannur is the district headquarters.

== Kottiyoor Vadakkeshwaram Temple ==
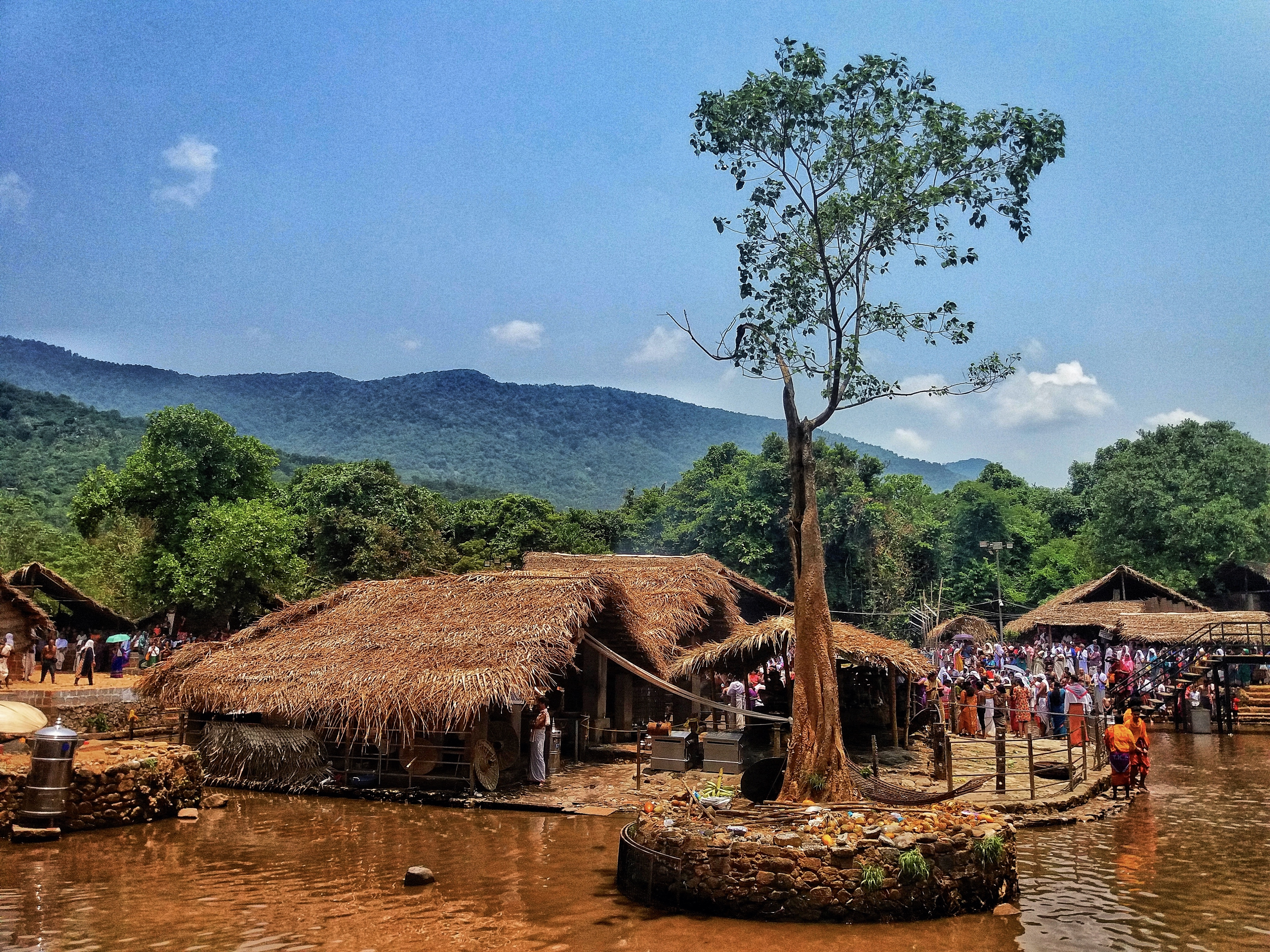

Kottiyoor Temple at Kottiyoor is one of the famous Lord Shiva temples of Kannur district. It is located approximately 50 km from Kannur. This Shiva temple is also known as the Kasi of South (Dakshina Kaasi) and as Ikkare Kottiyoor. Kottiyoor Temple is located near Kelakam. The temple is located in the Kottiyoor Wildlife Sanctuary (23rd WLS of Kerala). The main attraction is the yearly pilgrimage lasting 27 days called Kottiyoor Vysakha Mahotsavam, commemorating the Daksha Yaga, but during the time of pilgrimage the Thruchherumana Kshetram ('Ikkare Kottiyoor Temple') is closed. The shrine having the Swayambhu linga on the other bank of the Vavali river is only opened during the time of pilgrimage. The pilgrimage is attended by thousands of devotees.

== Parassinikadavu Muthappan Temple ==
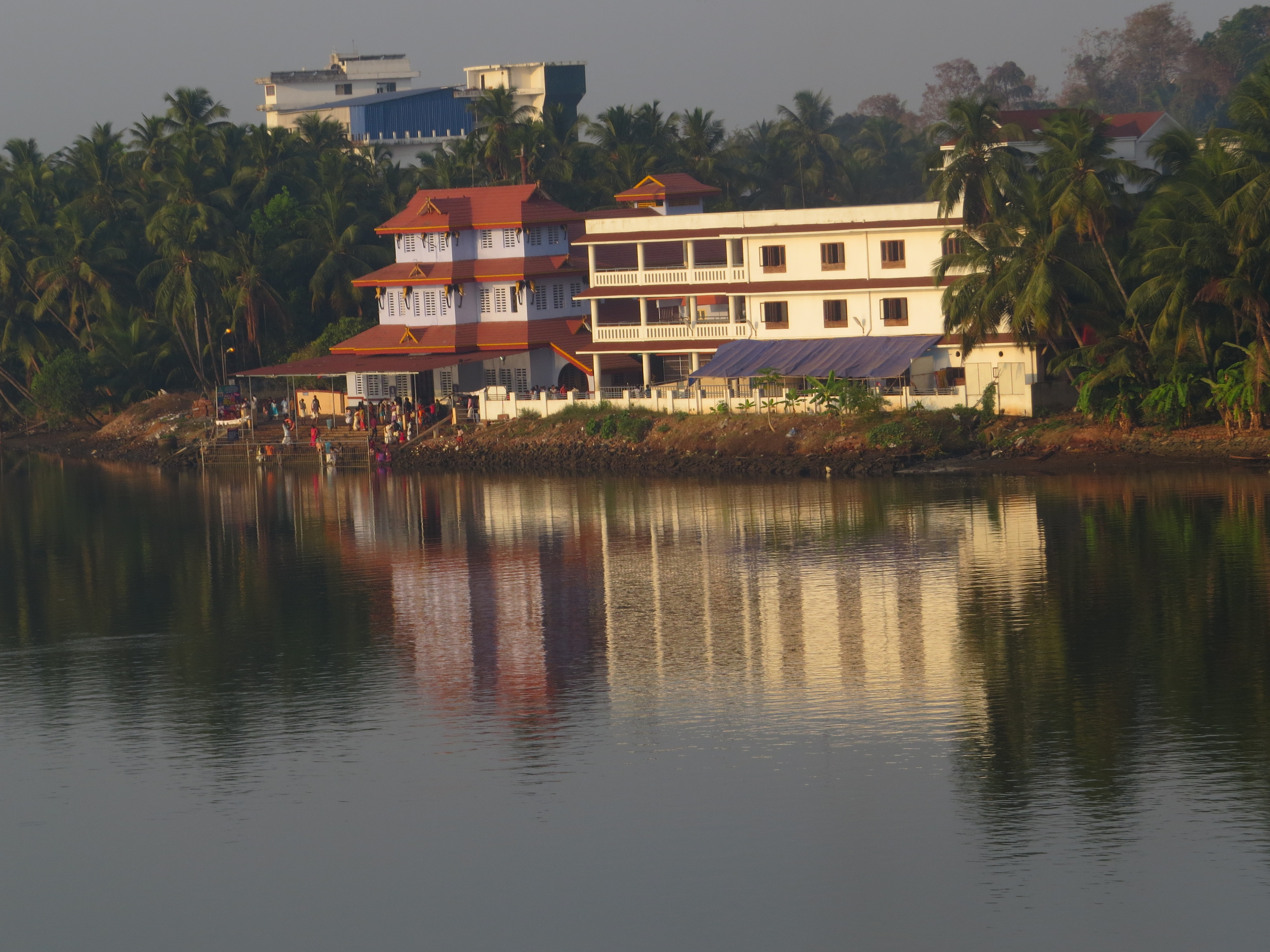

Sree Muthappan is the most popular god in the Kannur district. Muthappan is (also a theyyam) performed in the famous Muthappan temple in Parassinikkadavu 16 km north of Kannur town. Parassinikkadavu Sree Muthappan Temple is situated 18 km from Kannur on the banks of Valapattanam river. The temple is dedicated to Lord Muthappan, believed to be the incarnation of Lord Shiva. This is the only temple in Southern India where the offering to the god is fish. Also fish Prasadam is given to devotees. All devotees who eat non-vegetarian food visit this temple for blessings. This is also the only temple in Kerala where the folk art form of Kannur district's 'Theyyam' is presented daily. Toddy and dried fish are the main offerings in this temple, besides boiled grams and fresh tea. Meals as lunch and dinner are provided to the devotees daily. A facility for boating is also available here. Vismaya Water Theme Park and Parassinikkadavu Snake Park are situated near the temple.

== Sree Rajarajeshwara Temple‚ Taliparamba ==
The Rajarajeshwara Temple is a beautiful Shiva temple located at Taliparamba, Kannur district, Kerala, India. This temple is situated 25 km north of Kannur. The uniqueness of this temple is that it has no kodimaram/flagstaff and entry for women only after 8 pm. It is believed to be built by Mushika dynasty.

The temple is regarded as one of the 108 ancient Shiva temples of Kerala. It has a prominent place amongst the numerous Shiva temples in south India. If any problem is encountered in temples of South India, the final solution is sought in this Temple through a prasna, a traditional method of astrological decision making. The prasna is conducted on a peedha (a raised platform) situated outside the temple.

The quadrangular sanctum has a two-tiered pyramidal roof. In front of the sanctum is the namaskara mandapam. The temple has no kodi maram (flagstaff) which is a unique feature as other temples in Kerala do have one.

== Trichambaram Temple‚ Taliparamb ==
Trichambaram Temple is situated 20 km from Kannur, near Taliparamba town which is famous for its spices trade. The deity of the temple is Sree Krishna. The sculptures on the walls of the sanctum sanctorum are a class by themselves. The annual temple festival (Utsavam) is a colourful event. The fortnight-long festival begins on Kumbham 22 of Malayalam calendar (which generally falls on 6 March) every year with the kodiyettam (hoisting of a religious flag) and comes to an end on Meenam 6 (which generally falls on 20 March) with Koodipiriyal (Ending of this festival). In between these dates, for 11 days, thitambu nriththam (a sort of dance with idols of Sri Krishna and Balarama) is held at Pookoth Nada (1 km from Trichambaram temple).

== St. Mary's Forane Church‚ Edoor ==
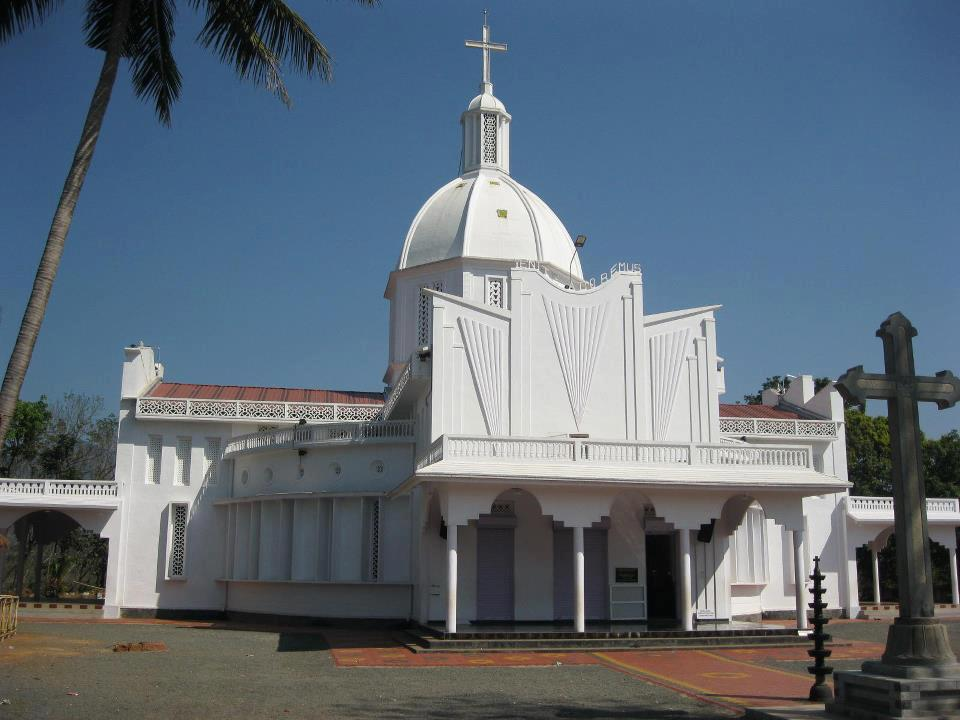
St. Mary's Forane Church‚ Edoor

St. Mary's Forane Church Edoor is one of the oldest churches and a notable Marian pilgrim centre in Kannur district of Kerala. It is near Iritty, the eastern town of Kannur district. This church is the first church in the name of St. Mary under the archdiocese of Thalassery. It is also the largest parish in the archdiocese. It is situated about 6.5 kilometres from the town of Iritty, which is also known as "The Coorg valley in the Gods' own country".

== Holy Trinity Cathedral, Burnassery, Diocese of Kannur ==
In 1498 Portuguese explorer Vasco da Gama landed at Calicut. Da Gama also visited Cannanore. In 1500 another Portuguese explorer Pedro Alvares Cabral reached Calicut. There were Franciscan missionaries with Cabral. He fell out with the Zamorin of Calicut. Cabral went to Cochin and was received by the ruler of Cochin. "In 1501 Portuguese explorer Cabral aligned with the Raja of Cannanore and set up a factory in Cannanore" "He brought with him a Franciscan friar Louis do Salvador to Cannanore" "Since then there has been a Portuguese Chapel in Cannanore" This church was named Nossa Senhora de Vitoria. That is where the present Holy Trinity Church Cathedral stands. "That very same year another Portuguese explorer Joao da Nova established a second factory at Cannanore". "He brought with him four Franciscans, Two each for Cochin&Cannanore." The Portuguese Viceroy Francisco de Almeida built the famous St. Angelo Fort in Kannur and along with it he got ready St. James Chapel inside the fort in the year 1505. In 1508 Cannanore boasted a fort, a hospital, two churches, warehouses and a powder factory. Pope John Paul II by the Apostolic Brief Ad Perpetuam Rei Memoriam, dated 5 November 1998, created the diocese of Kannur from the diocese of Calicut. On the same day, Varghese Chakkalakal was elected the Bishop of Kannur and he took charge of the diocese on 8 February 1999.

== Madayi Palli, Pazhayangadi ==
Madayi Palli is an ancient mosque was originally built in 1124 by Malik Ibn Dinar, a Muslim preacher. A block of white marble in the mosque is believed to have been brought from Mecca by its founder, who came to India to spread the word of Muhammad. Nearby lies a dilapidated fort believed to have been built by king Kolathiri. This mosque is near Pazhayangadi town.
