= Cheruthazham =

- Census Town
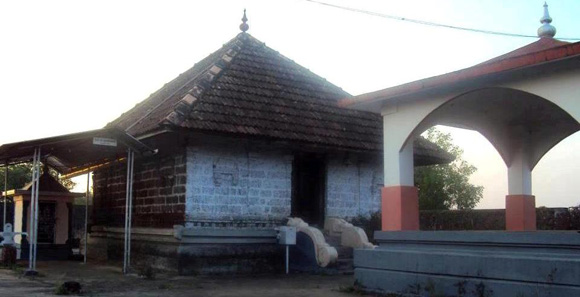
- Kunhimathilakam Temple

- Location in Kerala, India Cheruthazham (India)
- Coordinates: 12.0809700°N 75.2627200°E
- Country: India
- State: Kerala
- District: Kannur

Government
  - Type: Panchayati raj (India)

Area
  - Total: 20.9 km^{2} (8.1 sq mi)

Population (2011)
  - Total: 29,348
  - Density: 1,400/km^{2} (3,640/sq mi)

Languages
  - Official: Malayalam, English
- Time zone: UTC+5:30 (IST)
- PIN: 670501
- ISO 3166 code: IN-KL
- Vehicle registration: KL-86

Cheruthazham is a Census Town and Grama Panchayat in Kannur district in the state of Kerala, India. It is the location of the famous Hanumarambalam, dedicated to Sri Rama and Hanuman. Cherutazham is also the birthplace of Kalamandalam Krishnan Nair, who gave a new dimension to the art of Kathakali. There are many artists in Cherutazham who are experts in the traditional musical items like "panchavadyam", "taayambaka", "chenda melam", etc. The new generation of Cherutazham is also getting trained in these art forms.

== Demographics ==
As of 2011 Census, Cheruthazham had a population of 29,348 of which 13,571 are males and 15,777 are females. Cheruthazham census town spreads over an area of 32.17 km^{2} with 7,074 families residing in it. The male female sex ratio was 1,162 higher than state average of 1,084. 10.3% of the total population falls under 6 years age. Cheruthazham census town had overall literacy of 95%, higher than national average of 59% and higher than state average of 94%. The male literacy stands at 97.7% and female literacy was 92.7%.

== Religion ==
As of 2011 Indian census, Cheruthazham census town had total population of 29,348 which constitutes 76.5% Hindus, 13.5% Muslims, 9.8% Christians and 0.2% others.

== Transportation ==
The national highway passes through Pilathara junction. Goa and Mumbai can be accessed on the northern side and Cochin and Thiruvananthapuram can be accessed on the southern side. The road to the east of Iritty connects to Mysore and Bangalore. The nearest railway station is Payyanur on Mangalore-Palakkad line. Trains are available to almost all parts of India subject to advance booking over the internet. There are airports at Kannur, Mangalore and Calicut. All of them are international airports but direct flights are available only to Middle Eastern countries.

== Notable people ==
- Kalamandalam Krishnan Nair, Kathakali performer
- Cheruthazham Kunhiraman Marar, Indian percussionist
