= Vellora =

- village
- Location in Kerala, India Vellora (India)
- Coordinates: 12°10′0″N 75°21′0″E
- Country: India
- State: Kerala
- District: Kannur
- Taluk: Payyanur

Government
  - Body: Eramam-Kuttur Gram panchayat

Area
  - Total: 30.82 km^{2} (11.90 sq mi)

Population (2011)
  - Total: 10,239
  - Density: 332.2/km^{2} (860.4/sq mi)

Languages
  - Official: Malayalam, English
- Time zone: UTC+5:30 (IST)
- PIN: 670306
- Telephone code: 0498
- ISO 3166 code: IN-KL
- Vehicle registration: KL-86
- Lok Sabha constituency: Kasaragod
- Vidhan Sabha constituency: Payyanur

Vellora is a village in Kannur district in the Indian state of Kerala. It has state road connectivity, schools, hospitals, post office, and bank dating back to the 1950s.

== Demographics ==
As of 2011 Census, Vellora had total population of 10,239 where 4,859 are males and 5,380 females. Vellora village has an area of 30.82 km^{2} (11.90 sq mi) with 2,564 families residing in it. The sex ratio of Vellora was 1,107 higher than state average of 1,084. In Vellora, Population of children under 6 years was 10.2%. Vellora had overall literacy of 93.5%, higher than national average of 74% and lower than state average of 94%.

== Transportation ==
The national highway passes through Perumba junction. Goa and Mumbai can be accessed on the northern side and Cochin and Thiruvananthapuram can be accessed on the southern side. The road to the east of Iritty connects to Mysore and Bangalore. The nearest railway station is Payyanur on Mangalore-Palakkad line. Trains are available to almost all parts of India subject to advance booking over the internet. There are airports at Kannur, Mangalore and Calicut. All of them are international airports but direct flights are available only to Middle Eastern countries.
