= Payyanur railway station =

Railway station in Kerala, India

Payyanur
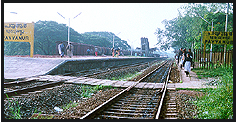
- Payyanur Station

General information
- Location: Kotty, Payyanur - Naval Academy road, Payyanur, Kerala; India
- Coordinates: 12.091°N 75.1951°E
- System: Indian Railways station
- Owner: Indian Railways
- Operator: Southern Railway zone
- Platforms: 3
- Tracks: 5
- Connections: Bus stand, Taxicab stand, Auto rickshaw stand

Construction
- Structure type: Standard (on ground station)
- Parking: Yes
- Accessible: Disabled access

Other information
- Status: Functioning
- Station code: PAY
- Zone(s): Southern Railway zone
- Division(s): Palakkad
- Classification: NSG-3
Route map
- Sources
Location
- Location within India Location within Kerala

Payyanur railway station (station code: PAY) is an NSG–3 category Indian railway station in the Palakkad railway division of the Southern Railway zone. It serves the town of Payyanur in the Kannur district of Kerala and lies on the Shoranur-Mangalore section of the Southern Railway zone. The station functions as an important transit hub for the Indian Naval Academy, Ezhimala and the CRPF Recruits Training Centre at Peringome, and caters to passengers from the northern and north-eastern Kannur district as well as southern Kasaragod district. It is the second largest railway station in Kannur district by area, after Kannur railway station. In the 2025-26 fiscal year, Payyanur railway station recorded ₹26.75 crore in passenger revenue. The first railway coach restaurant in Kerala was opened at Payyanur railway station named as Juju Express.

== Line ==
It lies in the Shoranur–Mangalore section of the Southern Railways. The station has three platforms and five tracks.

== Location ==
Payyanur Railway station is located on Ezhimala Naval Academy - Payyanur road, about 3.6 km from Payyanur New Bus Stand and 2.7 km from Old Bus Stand, Payyanur, and 4.4 km from KSRTC bus stand, Payyanur.

Kannur International Airport is 60 km from the railway station.

== Services ==
No trains originate from the station. Trains halting at the station connect the town to prominent cities in India such as Trivandrum, Kochi, Mumbai, Chennai, Bangalore, Hyderabad, Kozhikode, Kannur, Thrissur, Coimbatore, Madgaon, Mangalore, Mysore, Pune, Pondicherry, New Delhi and so forth.

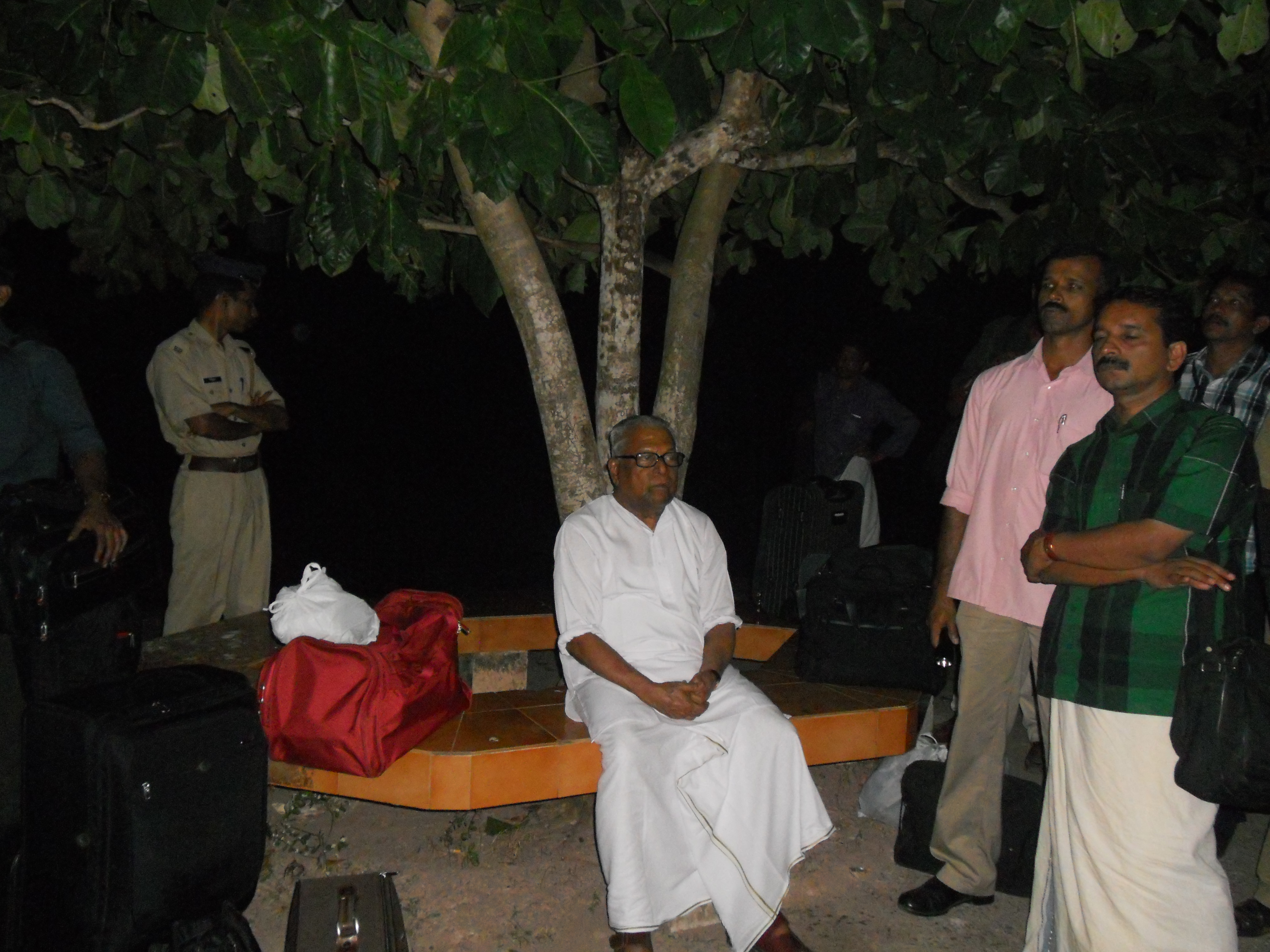
Former Kerala Chief Minister V. S. Achuthanandan waiting for a train at Payyanur station

== Importance ==
The Indian Naval Academy is located approximately 5 km (3.1 mi) from the railway station. The CRPF Recruit Training Centre-3 in Peringome is located approximately 22 km (14 mi) from the railway station.
