= Alva =

Alva may refer to:

== People and fictional characters ==
- Alva (given name), including a list of people and fictional characters
- Alva (surname), including a list of people
- Alva Noto, stage name of German musician Carsten Nicolai (born 1965)

== Places ==
=== Portugal ===
- Alva, a civil parish in Castro Daire Municipality
- Alva River, a tributary of the Mondego

=== United States ===
- Alva, Florida, a census-designated place
- Alva Bridge, a bridge over the Caloosahatchee River
- Alva, Kentucky, an unincorporated community
- Blaine, Maine, a town, named Alva before its incorporation
- Alva, Mississippi, an unincorporated community
- Alva, Oklahoma, a city
- Alva, Wyoming, an unincorporated community

=== Elsewhere ===
- Alva, Hansot, Gujarat, India, a village
- Alva, Clackmannanshire, Scotland, a small town
- Alva, Gotland, Sweden a settlement in Sweden
- Alva, Eldivan, Turkey, a village
- 2353 Alva, an asteroid

== Food and drink ==
- Alva (grape), an alternative name for the Portuguese wine grape Roupeiro
- Alva, an alternative name for the German wine grape Elbling
- Halva or alva, a sweet made of flour

== Other uses ==
- Alupa dynasty, alternate name Alva, an ancient ruling dynasty from India
- Alva (automobile), French car manufactured from 1913 to 1923
- Alva Skates, a skateboard company founded by Tony Alva
- Alva Academy, Clackmannanshire, Scotland, a comprehensive school
- Alva Consolidated Schools, Alva, Florida, on the National Register of Historic Places

== See also ==
- House of Alba, a Spanish aristocratic family
- Alvah, a Biblical name
- Elva (disambiguation)
