= King of Kings =

Ruling title used by certain historical monarchs

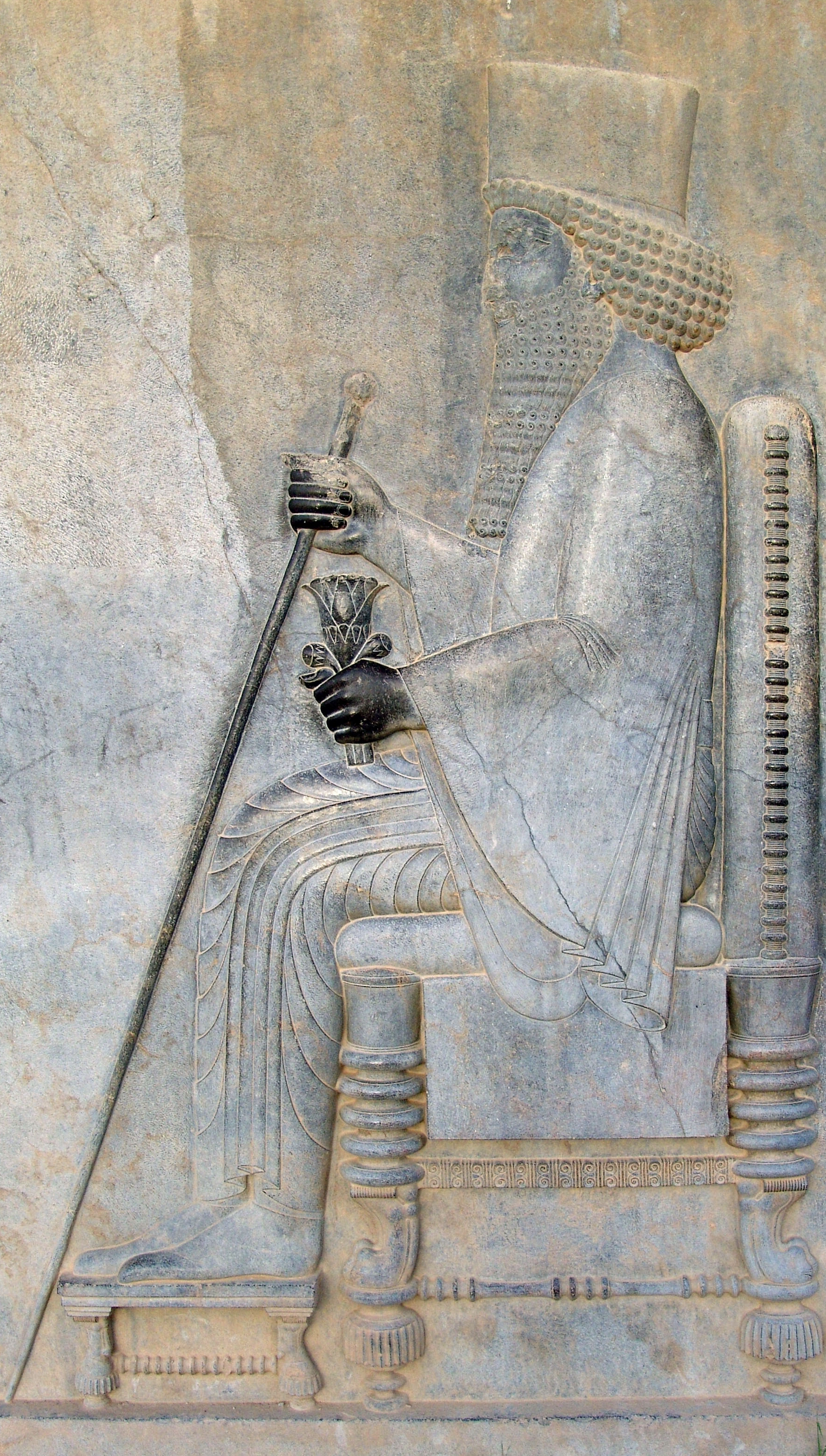
The title King of Kings was prominently used by kings such as Darius the Great (pictured). The full titulature of Darius was Great King, King of Kings, King of Persia, King of the Countries, Hystaspes' son, Arsames' grandson, an Achaemenid.

King of Kings (Note: Akkadian: šar šarrāni; Classical Syriac: ܡܠܸܟ݂ ܡܲܠܟܹ̈ܐ, romanized: mleḵ malkē;Hebrew: מֶלֶךְ מְלָכִים, romanized: melek mĕlakîm; Old Persian: Xšāyaθiya Xšāyaθiyānām; Middle Persian: šāhān šāh; Modern Persian: شاهنشاه, romanized: Šâhanšâh; Ancient Greek: Βασιλεὺς Βασιλέων, romanized: Basileùs Basiléōn; Armenian: արքայից արքա, romanized: ark'ayits ark'a; Sanskrit: महाराजाधिराज, romanized: Mahārājadhirāja; Georgian: მეფეთ მეფე, Mepet mepe; Ge'ez: ንጉሠ ነገሥት, romanized: Nəgusä Nägäst) was an imperial title employed primarily by monarchs based in the Middle East and the Indian subcontinent. Commonly associated with Iran (historically known as Persia), especially the Achaemenid and Sasanian Empires, the title was originally introduced during the Middle Assyrian Empire by King Tukulti-Ninurta I (reigned 1233–1197 BC) and was subsequently used in a number of different kingdoms and empires, including the aforementioned Persia, various Hellenic kingdoms, India, Armenia, Georgia, and Ethiopia.

The title is commonly seen as equivalent to that of Emperor, both titles outranking that of king in prestige, stemming from the late antique Roman and Eastern Roman emperors who saw the Shahanshahs of the Sasanian Empire as their equals. The last reigning monarchs to use the title of Shahanshah, those of the Pahlavi dynasty in Iran (1925–1979), also equated the title with "Emperor". The rulers of the Ethiopian Empire used the title of Nəgusä Nägäst (literally "King of Kings"), which was officially translated as "Emperor". Sultan of Sultans is the sultanic equivalent of King of Kings and similarly, Khagan can mean "Khan of Khans". Later, lesser versions Amir al-umara ("Emir of Emirs") and Beylerbey ("Bey of Beys") appeared.

In Judaism, Melech Malchei HaMelachim ("the King of Kings of Kings") came to be used as a name of God. "King of Kings" (Ancient Greek: βασιλεὺς τῶν βασιλευόντων, romanized: basileùs ton basileuónton) is also used in reference to Jesus Christ several times in the Bible, notably in the First Epistle to Timothy and twice in the Book of Revelation.

== Historical usage ==
=== Ancient Near East ===
==== Ancient Egypt ====
Amenhotep III is the first known to have used this title. It was added to his Horus name as kꜣ nḫt ḥqꜣ ḥqꜣw (ka nakht heqa heqau). It means "the victorious bull and ruler of rulers".

==== Assyria and Babylon ====
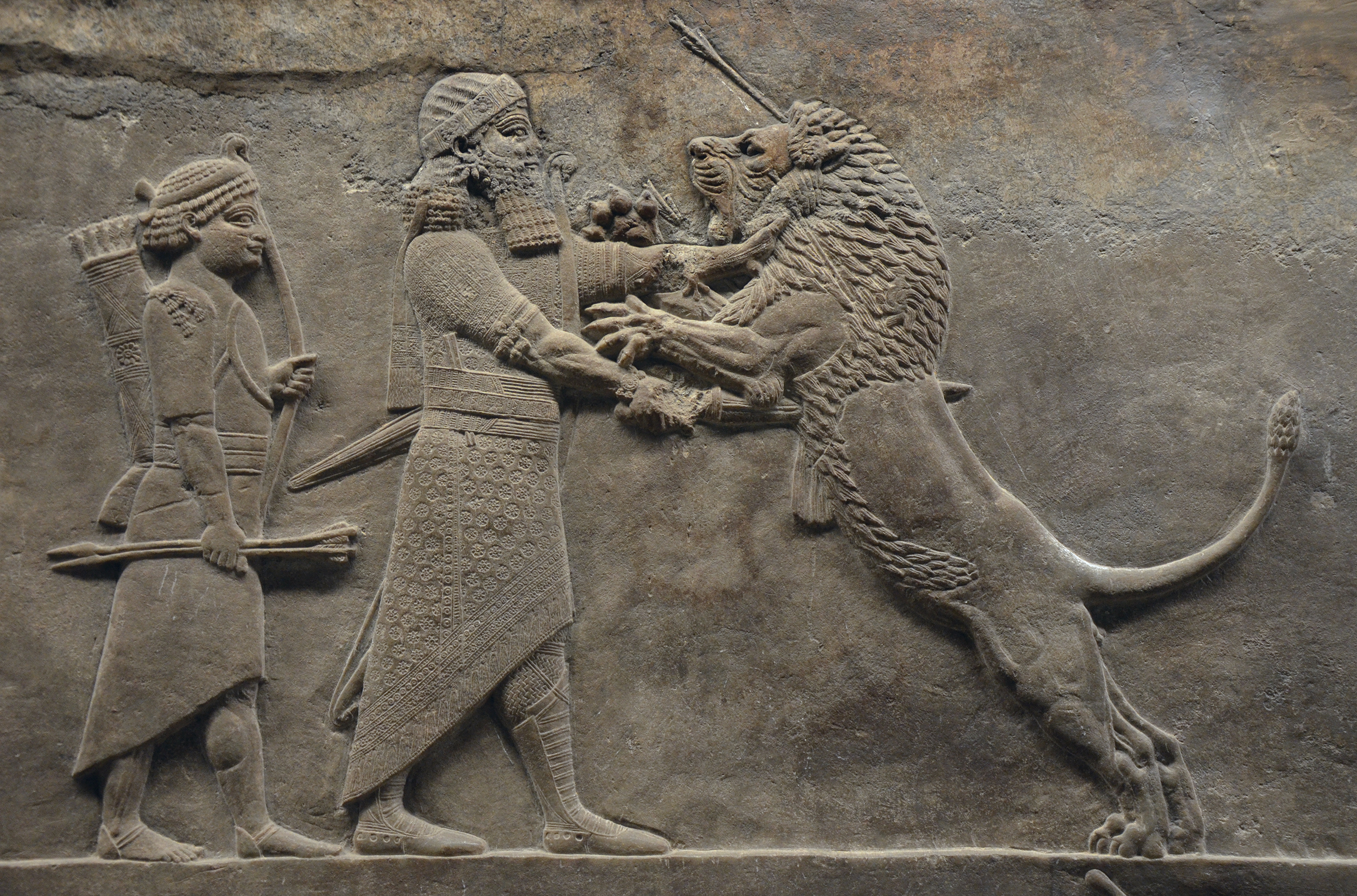
King of Kings was among the many titles used by King Ashurbanipal of the Neo-Assyrian Empire, depicted strangling and stabbing a lion.

The Assyrian version of the title King of Kings was first introduced by the Assyrian king Tukulti-Ninurta I (who reigned between 1233 and 1197 BC) as šar šarrāni. The title carried a literal meaning in that a šar was traditionally simply the ruler of a city-state. With the formation of the Middle Assyrian Empire, the Assyrian rulers installed themselves as kings over an already present system of kingship in these city-states, becoming literal "kings of kings".

Following Tukulti-Ninurta's reign, the title was occasionally used by monarchs of Assyria and Babylon. Later Assyrian rulers to use šar šarrāni include Esarhaddon (r. 681–669 BC) and Ashurbanipal (r. 669–627 BC). "King of Kings", as šar šarrāni, was among the many titles of the last Neo-Babylonian king, Nabonidus (r. 556–539 BC).

Boastful titles claiming ownership of various things were common throughout ancient Mesopotamian history. For instance, Ashurbanipal's great-grandfather Sargon II used the full titulature of Great King, Mighty King, King of the Universe, King of Assyria, King of Babylon, King of Sumer and Akkad.

==== Urartu and Media ====
The title of King of Kings occasionally appears in inscriptions of kings of Urartu. Although no evidence exists, it is possible that the title was also used by the rulers of the Median Empire, since its rulers borrowed much of their royal symbolism and protocol from Urartu and elsewhere in Mesopotamia. The Achaemenid Persian variant of the title, Xšāyaθiya Xšāyaθiyānām, is Median in form which suggests that the Achaemenids may have taken it from the Medes rather than from the Mesopotamians.

An Assyrian-language inscription on a fortification near the fortress of Tušpa mentions King Sarduri I of Urartu as a builder of a wall and a holder of the title King of Kings;

This is the inscription of king Sarduri, son of the great king Lutipri, the powerful king who does not fear to fight, the amazing shepherd, the king who ruled the rebels. I am Sarduri, son of Lutipri, the king of kings and the king who received the tribute of all the kings. Sarduri, son of Lutipri, says: I brought these stone blocks from the city of Alniunu. I built this wall.

— Sarduri I of Urartu

==== Iran ====
===== Achaemenid usage =====
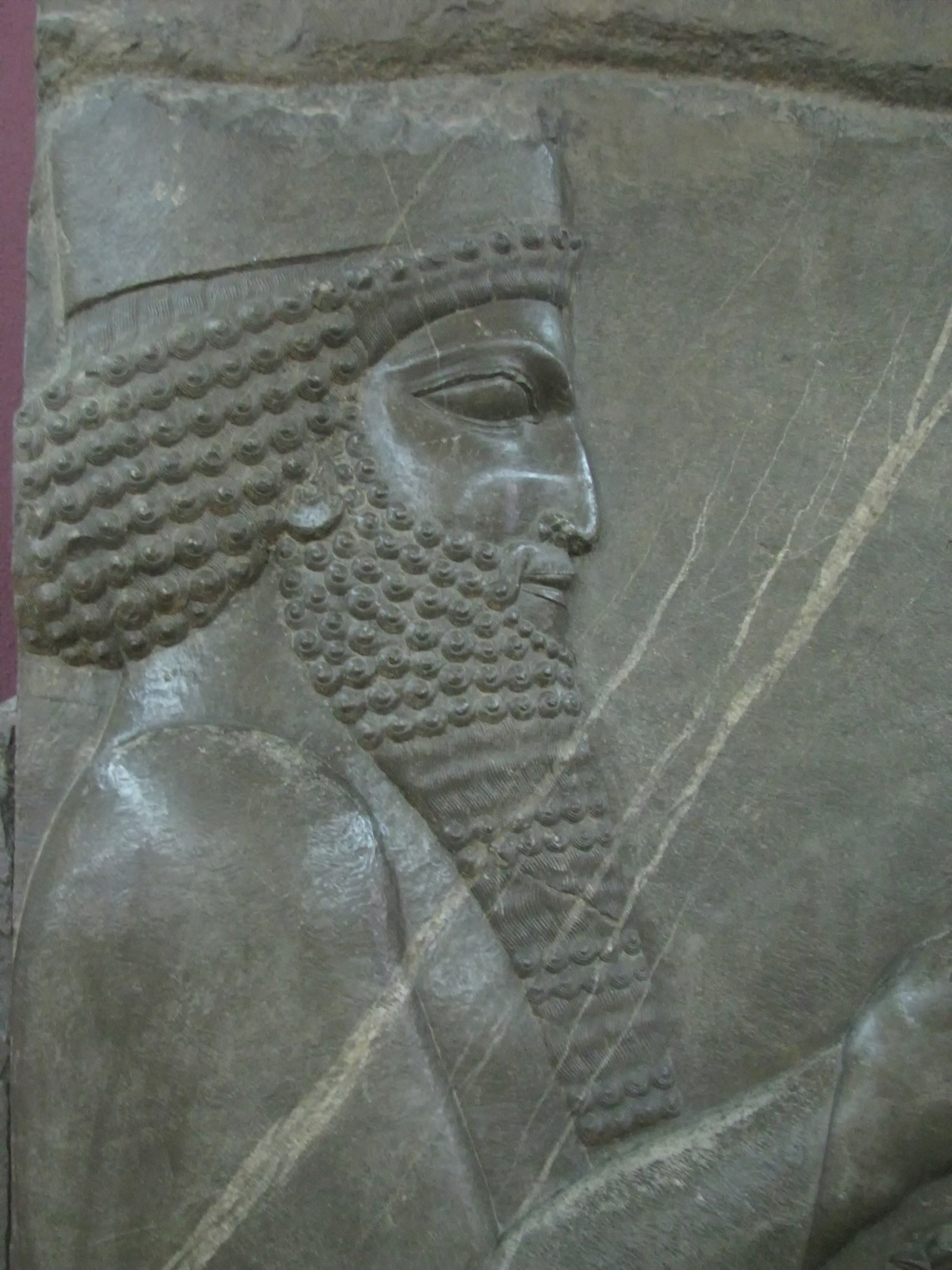
Xerxes the Great of the Achaemenid Empire referred to himself as the great king, the king of kings, the king of the provinces with many languages, the king of this great earth far and near, son of king Darius the Achaemenian.

The Achaemenid Empire, established in 550 BC after the fall of the Median Empire, rapidly expanded in the sixth century BC. They conquered Asia Minor and the Lydian Kingdom in 546 BC, the Neo-Babylonian Empire in 539 BC, Egypt in 525 BC and the Indus River region in 513 BC. The Achaemenids employed satrapal administration, which became a guarantee of success due to its flexibility and the tolerance of the Achaemenid kings for more-or-less autonomous vassals.

The system also had its problems. Though some regions became nearly completely autonomous without any fighting (such as Lycia and Cilicia), other regions saw repeated attempts at rebellion and secession. Egypt was a particularly prominent example, frequently rebelling against Achaemenid authority and attempting to crown their own Pharaohs. Though it was eventually defeated, the Great Satraps' Revolt of 366–360 BC showed the growing structural problems within the Empire.

The Achaemenid Kings used a variety of different titles, prominently Great King and King of Countries, but perhaps the most prominent title was that of King of Kings (rendered Xšāyaθiya Xšāyaθiyānām in Old Persian), recorded for every Achaemenid king. The full titulature of the king Darius I was "great king, king of kings, king in Persia, king of the countries, Hystaspes' son, Arsames' grandson, an Achaemenid". An inscription in the Armenian city of Van by Xerxes I reads;

I am Xerxes, the great king, the king of kings, the king of the provinces with many tongues, the king of this great earth far and near, son of king Darius the Achaemenian.

— Xerxes I of Persia

There are many other appearances in the ruins of Ecbatana and Susa.

===== Parthian and Sasanian usage =====
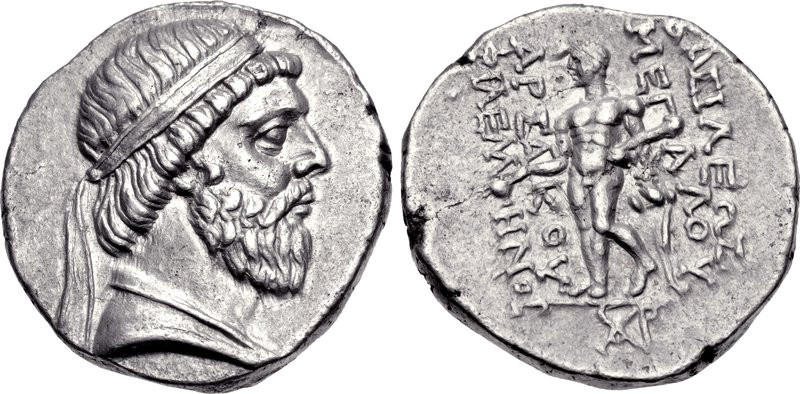
Mithridates I of Parthia (r. 171–132 BC) was the first post-Achaemenid Iranian king to use the title of King of Kings. Beginning with the reign of his nephew Mithridates II (r. 124–88 BC), the title remained in consistent usage until the fall of the Sasanian Empire in 651 AD.

The standard royal title of the Arsacid (Parthian) kings while in Babylon was Aršaka šarru ("Arsacid king"), King of Kings (recorded as šar šarrāni by contemporary Babylonians) was adopted first by Mithridates I (r. 171–132 BC), though he used it infrequently. The title first began being consistently used by Mithridates I's nephew, Mithridates II, who after adopting it in 111 BC used it extensively, even including it in his coinage (as the Greek BAΣIΛEΥΣ BAΣIΛEΩN) until 91 BC. It is possible that Mithridates II's, and his successors', use of the title was not a revival of the old Achaemenid imperial title (since it was not used until almost a decade after Mithridates II's own conquest of Mesopotamia) but actually stemmed from Babylonian scribes who accorded the imperial title of their own ancestors onto the Parthian kings. Regardless of how he came to acquire the title, Mithridates II did undertake conscious steps to be seen as an heir to and restorer of Achaemenid traditions, introducing a crown as the customary headgear on Parthian coins and undertaking several campaigns westwards into former Achaemenid lands.

The title was rendered as šāhān šāh in Middle Persian and Parthian and remained in consistent use until the ruling Arsacids were supplanted by the Sasanian dynasty of Ardashir I, creating the Sasanian Empire. Ardashir himself used a new variant of the title, introducing "Shahanshah of the Iranians" (Middle Persian: šāhān šāh ī ērān). Ardashir's successor Shapur I introduced another variant; "Shahanshah of the Iranians and non-Iranians" (Middle Persian: šāhān šāh ī ērān ud anērān), possibly only assumed after Shapur's victories against the Roman Empire (which resulted in the incorporation of new non-Iranian lands into the empire). This variant, Shahanshah of Iranians and non-Iranians, appear on the coinage of all later Sasanian kings. The final Shahanshah of the Sasanian Empire was Yazdegerd III (r. 632–651 AD). His reign ended with the defeat and conquest of Persia by the Rashidun Caliphate, ending the last pre-Islamic Iranian Empire. The defeat of Yazdegerd and the fall of the Sasanian Empire was a blow to the national sentiment of the Iranians, which was slow to recover. Although attempts were made at restoring the Sasanian Empire, even with Chinese help, these attempts failed and the descendants of Yazdegerd faded into obscurity. The title Shahanshah was criticized by later Muslims, associating it with the Zoroastrian faith and referring to it as "impious".

===== Buyid revival =====
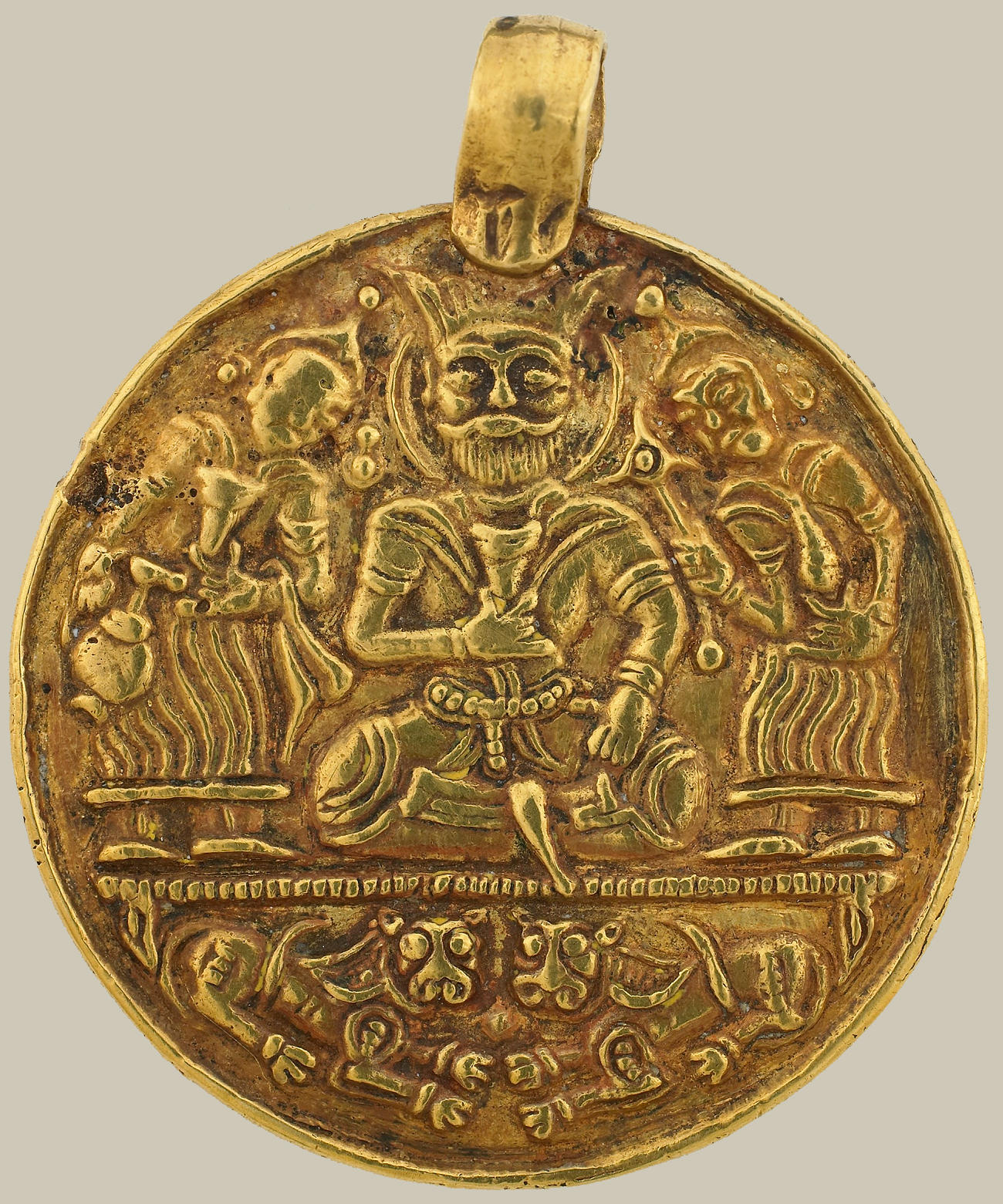
Panāh Khusraw, better known by his laqab 'Adud al-Dawla, revived the title of Shahanshah in Iran in the year 978 AD, more than three centuries after the fall of the Sasanian Empire.

Following the fall of the Sasanian Empire, Iran was part of the early caliphates. From the 9th century on, parts of Iran were ruled by a series of relatively short-lived Muslim Iranian dynasties; including the Samanids and Saffarids. Although Iranian resentment against the Abbasid Caliphate was common, the resentment materialized as religious and political movements combining old Iranian traditions with new Arabic ones rather than as full-scale revolts. The new dynasties do not appear to have had any interest in re-establishing the empire of the old Shahanshahs, they at no point seriously questioned the suzerainty of the Caliphs and actively promoted Arabic culture. Though the Samanids and the Saffarids also actively promoted the revival of the Persian language, the Samanids remained loyal supporters of the Abbasids and the Saffarids, despite at times being in open rebellion, did not revive any of the old Iranian political structures.

The Shi'a Buyid dynasty, of Iranian Daylamite origin, came to power in 934 AD through most of the old Iranian heartland. In contrast to earlier dynasties, ruled by emirs and wanting to appease the powerful ruling Abbasid caliphs, the Buyids consciously revived old symbols and practices of the Sasanian Empire. The region of Daylam had resisted the Caliphate since the fall of the Sasanian Empire, attempts at restoring a native Iranian rule built on Iranian traditions had been many, though unsuccessful. Asfar ibn Shiruya, a Zoroastrian and Iranian nationalist, rebelled against the Samanids in 928 AD, intending to put a crown on himself, set up a throne of gold and make war on the Caliph. More prominently, Mardavij, who founded the Ziyarid dynasty, was also Zoroastrian and actively aspired to restore the old empire. He was quoted as promising to destroy the empire of the Arabs and restore the Iranian empire and had a crown identical to the one worn by the Sasanian Khosrow I made for himself. At the time he was murdered by his own Turkic troops, Mardavij was planning a campaign towards Baghdad, the Abbasid capital. Subsequent Ziyarid rulers were Muslim and made no similar attempts.

After the death of Mardavij, many of his troops entered into the service of the founder of the Buyid dynasty, Imad al-Dawla. Finally, the Buyid Emir Panāh Khusraw, better known by his laqab (honorific name) of 'Adud al-Dawla, proclaimed himself Shahanshah after defeating rebellious relatives and becoming the sole ruler of the Buyid dynasty in 978 AD. (Note: Though the title being revived by 'Adud al-Dawla is the most common view, some scant evidence suggests that it may have been assumed by Buyid rulers even earlier, possibly by Dawla's father Rukn al-Dawla or uncle Imad al-Dawla.) Those of his successors that likewise exercised full control over all the Buyid emirates would also style themselves as Shahanshah.

During times of Buyid infighting, the title became a matter of importance. When a significant portion of Firuz Khusrau's (laqab Jalal al-Dawla) army rebelled in the 1040s and wished to enthrone the other Buyid Emir Abu Kalijar as ruler over the lands of the entire dynasty, they minted coins in his name with one side bearing the name of the ruling Caliph (Al-Qa'im) and the other side bearing the inscription "al-Malik al-Adil Shahanshah". When discussing peace terms, Abu Kalijar in turn addressed Jalal in a letter with the title Shahanshah.

When the struggle between Abu Kalijar and Jalal al-Dawla resumed, Jalal, wanting to assert his superiority over Kalijar, made a formal application to Caliph Al-Qa'im for the usage of the title Shahanshah, the first Buyid ruler to do so. It can be assumed that the Caliph agreed (since the title was later used), but its usage by Jalal in a mosque caused outcry at its impious character. Following this, the matter was raised to a body of jurists assembled by the Caliph. Though some dissented, the body as a whole ruled that the usage of al-Malik al-Adil Shahanshah was lawful.

=== Classical Antiquity ===
==== Latin and Hellenic usage ====
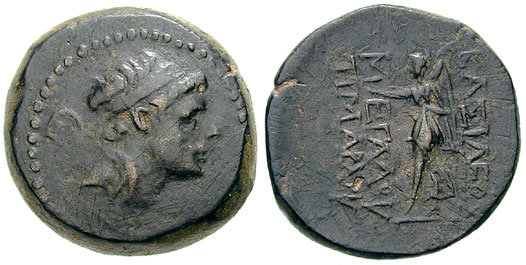
Although the Hellenic Seleucid rulers frequently assumed old Persian titles and honors, the usurper Timarchus is one of few concrete examples of a Seleucid ruler using the title "King of Kings".

Alexander the Great's conquests ended the Achaemenid Empire and the subsequent division of Alexander's own empire resulted in the Seleucid dynasty inheriting the lands formerly associated with the Achaemenid dynasty. Although Alexander himself did not employ any of the old Persian royal titles, instead using his own new title "King of Asia" (βασιλεὺς τῆς Ἀσίας), the monarchs of the Seleucid Empire more and more aligned themselves to the Persian political system. The official title of most of the Seleucid kings was "Great King", which like "King of Kings", a title of Assyrian origin, was frequently used by the Achaemenid rulers and was intended to demonstrate the supremacy of its holder over other rulers. "Great King" is prominently attested for both Antiochus I (r. 281–261 BC) in the Borsippa Cylinder and for Antiochus III the Great (r. 222–187 BC) throughout his rule.

In the late Seleucid Empire, "King of Kings" even saw a revival, despite the fact that the territory controlled by the Empire was significantly smaller than it had been during the reigns of the early Seleucid kings. The title was evidently quite well known to be associated with the Seleucid king, the usurper Timarchus (active 163–160 BC) called himself "King of Kings" and the title was discussed in sources from outside the empire as well. Some non-Seleucid rulers even assumed the title for themselves, notably in Pontus (especially prominently used under Mithridates VI Eupator). Pharnaces II had appeared as King of Kings in inscriptions and royal coins, and Mithridates Eupator had appeared as King of Kings in an inscription.

It is possible that the Seleucid usage indicates that the title no longer implied complete vassalization of other kings but instead a recognition of suzerainty (since the Seleucids were rapidly losing the loyalty of their vassals at the time).

In the Ptolemaic Kingdom, Caesarion was proclaimed "King of Kings" in the Donations of Alexandria.

Hannibalianus, nephew of Constantine I, was titled Rex Regum ("King of Kings").

==== Armenia ====
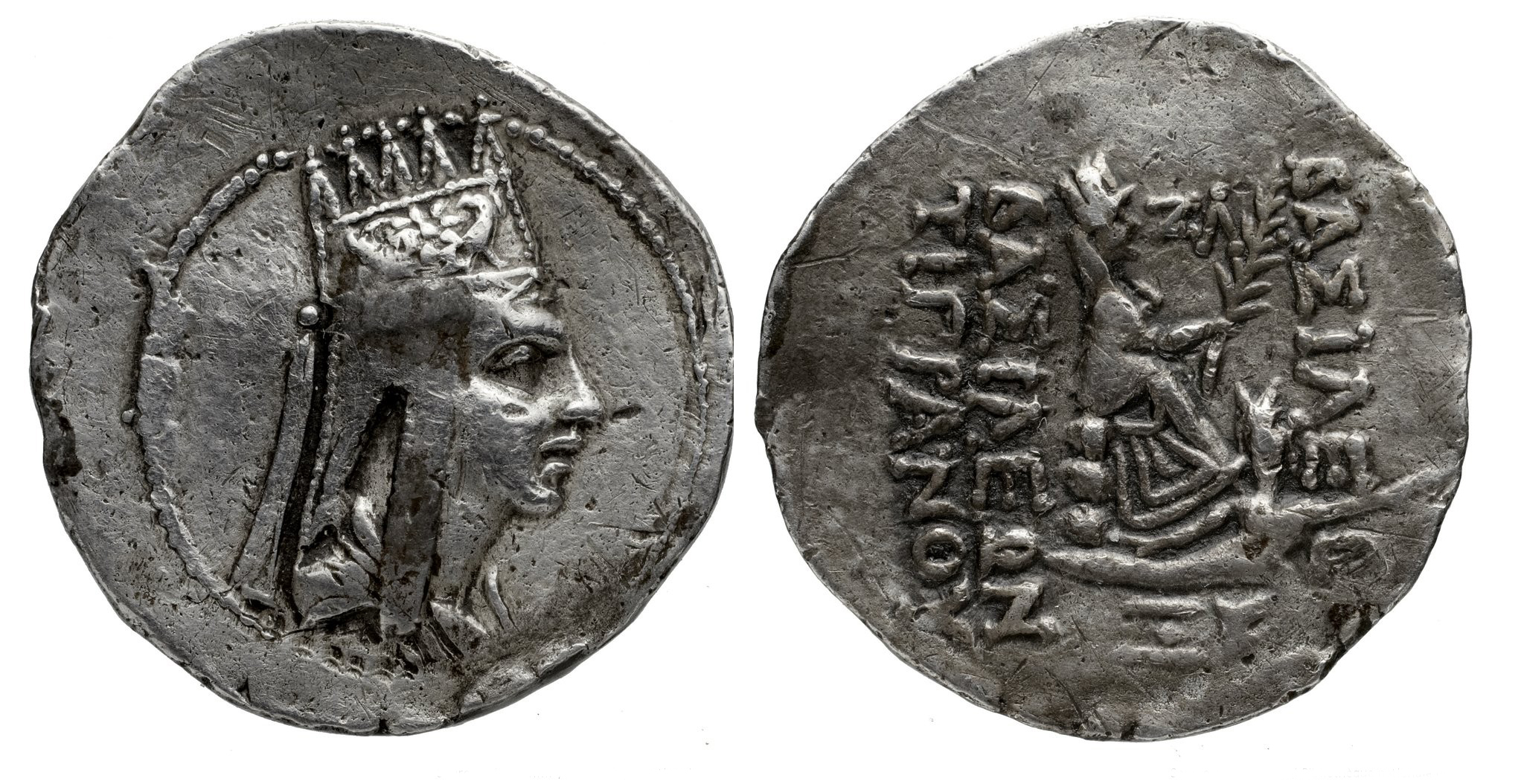
Tetradrachm of Tigranes the Great of Armenia with the title King of Kings (ΒΑΣΙΛΕΩΣ ΒΑΣΙΛΕΩΝ)

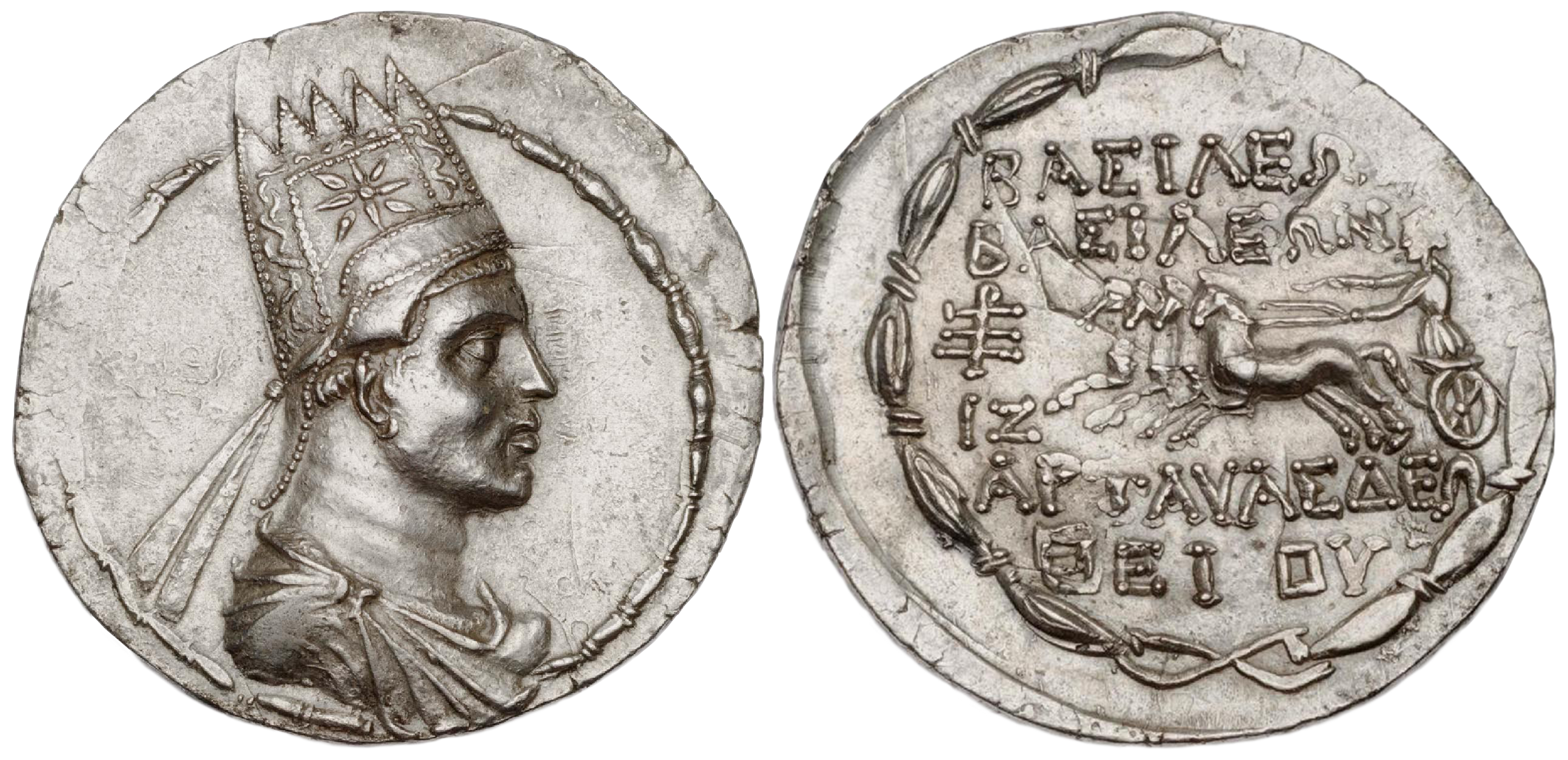
Silver tetradrachm of king of Armenia Artavasdes II (55-34 BC), son of Tigranes the Great. The inscription in Greek reads: King of Kings Artavasdes the God

After the Parthian Empire under Mithridates II defeated Armenia in 105 BC, the heir to the Armenian throne, Tigranes, was taken hostage and kept at the Parthian court until he bought his freedom in 95 BC (by handing over "seventy valleys" in Atropatene) and assumed the Armenian throne. Having come to power, Tigranes immediately began an expansionist policy (starting with the annexation of Sophene in 94 BC); having defeated the Parthians, he not only regained the previously lost territories ("seventy valleys"), but also subjugated the northern vassals of Parthia (Atropatene, Gordyene, Adiabene, Osroene). Tigranes ruled, for a short time in the first century BC, the strongest empire in the Middle East which he had built himself. After conquering Syria in 83 BC, Tigranes assumed the title King of Kings.

The Armenian kings of the Bagratuni dynasty from the reign of Ashot II (acquired the title in 919/922) to the dynasty's end in 1064 revived the title, rendering it as the Persian Shahanshah.

==== Ancient India ====
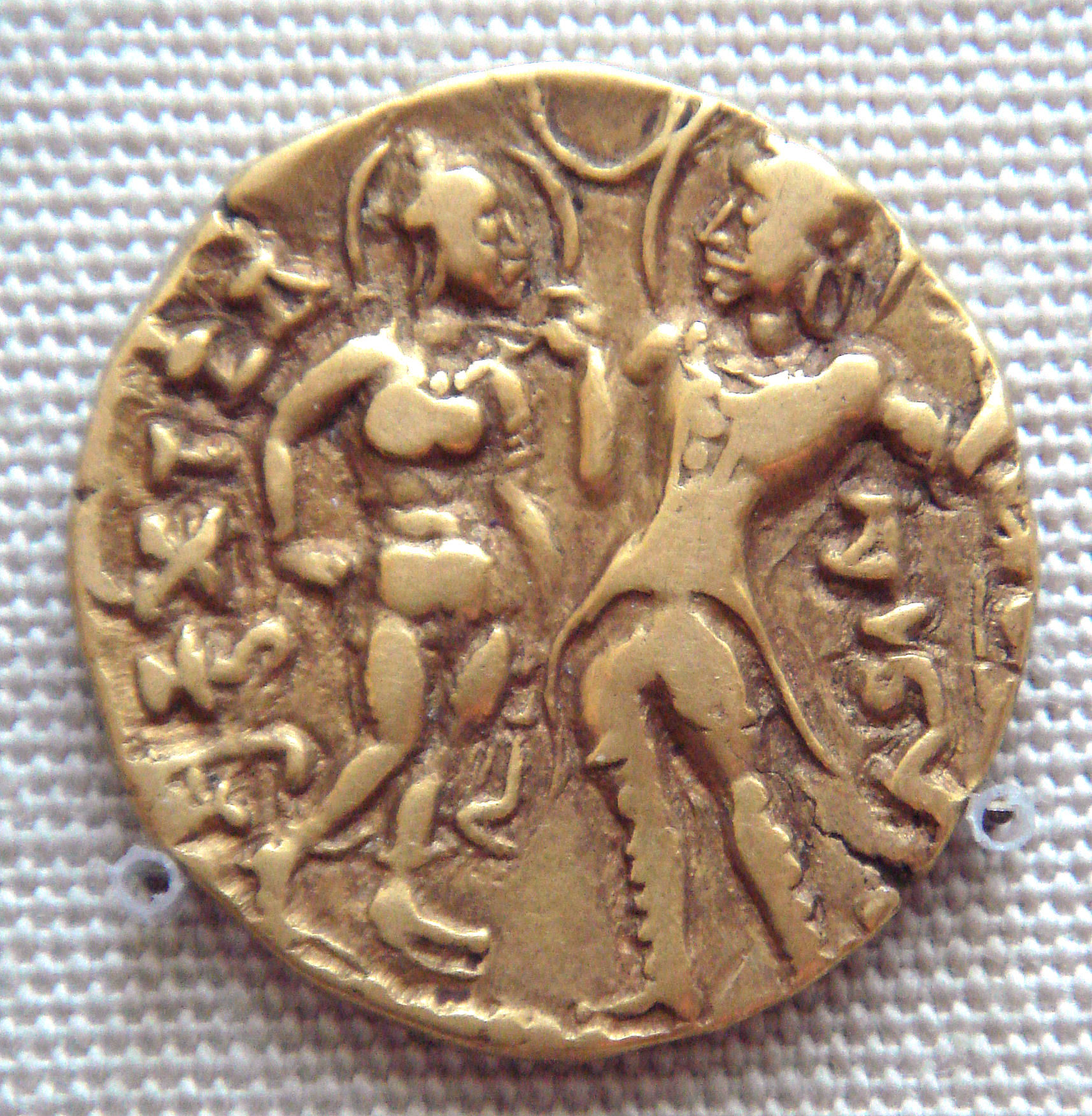
Chandragupta I of Gupta, generally known as Maharajadhiraja, i.e., the king of kings.

In Ancient India, Sanskrit language words such as Rājādhirāja and Mahārājādhirāja are among the terms that were used for employing the title of the King of Kings. These words also occur in Aitareya Aranyaka and other parts of Rigveda. Paramabhattaraka-Maharajadhiraja-Paramesvara was a standard formula of imperial dignity in India.

The monarchs of the Gupta Empire assumed the imperial title of Maharajadhiraja. The Bhauma-Kara kings assumed the imperial title of Maharajadhiraja. The Gurjara-Pratihara monarch in the tenth century was titled the Maharajadhiraja of Aryavarta. The imperial title of Maharajadhiraja was used by rulers of the Pallava dynasty, the Pala Empire and the Salasthamba dynasty. The regnal name of some Chola emperors, such as Rajadhiraja I and Rajadhiraja II, was Rajadhiraja. The Vijayanagara rulers assumed the imperial title of Maharajadhiraja. The title of King of Kings (rajadhiraja) was also common among the rulers of the Kushan Empire.

The titles Rajadhiraja and Maharajadhiraja, which were grand titles in ancient India, were devaluated in the course of time.

==== Palmyra ====
After a successful campaign against the Sasanian Empire in 262 AD, which restored Roman control to territories that had been lost to the Shahanshah Shapur I, the ruler of the city of Palmyra, Odaenathus, founded the Palmyrene kingdom. Though a Roman vassal, Odaenathus assumed the title Mlk Mlk dy Mdnh (King of Kings and Corrector of the East). Odaenathus son, Herodianus (Hairan I) was acclaimed as his co-monarch, also given the title King of Kings. Usage of the title was probably justified through proclaiming the Palmyrene kingdom as the legitimate successor state of the Hellenic Seleucid empire, which had controlled roughly the same territories near its end. Herodianus was crowned at Antioch, which had been the final Seleucid capital.

Though the same title was used by Odaenathus second son and successor following the deaths of both Odaenathus and Herodianus, Vaballathus and his mother Zenobia soon relinquished it, instead opting for the Roman Augustus ("Emperor") and Augusta ("Empress") respectively.

=== Middle ages ===
==== Champa ====
From the 7th century to 15th century, grand rulers of Chamic-speaking confederation of Champa, which existed from 3rd century AD to 1832 in present-day Central Vietnam, employed titles raja-di-raja (king of kings) and pu po tana raya (king of kings). However, some, such as Vikrantavarman II, held the title of maharajadhiraja (great king of kings) instead of raja-di-raja. The early kings of Champa before decentralization referred themselves by several different titles such as mahārāja (great king), e.g. Bhadravarman I (r.380–413), or campāpr̥thivībhuj (lord of the land of Champa) used by Kandarpadharma (r. 629–640).

==== Ethiopia ====
The rulers of the Ethiopian Empire used the title of Nəgusä Nägäst, which was used by the Aksumite Kingdom's monarchs since the reign Sembrouthes c. 250 AD. The title is sometimes translated to "King of the Kingdom", but most often equated to "King of Kings" and officially translated to "Emperor". Though the Ethiopian Emperors had been literal "Kings of Kings" for the duration of the Empire's history, with regional lords using the title of Nəgus ("king"), this practice was ended by Haile Selassie (r. 1930–1974 AD), who somewhat paradoxically still retained the use of Nəgusä Nägäst.

==== Georgia ====
King of Kings was revived in the Kingdom of Georgia by King David IV (r. 1089–1125 AD), rendered as mepet mepe in Georgian. All subsequent Georgian monarchs, such as Tamar the Great, used the title to describe their rule over all Georgian principalities, vassals and tributaries. Their use of the title probably derived from the ancient Persian title.

==== Java and Sumatra ====
In Java and Sumatra, some monarchs, such as Kertanagara and Adityawarman, used the title of Maharajadhiraja. According to the royal seals, the monarchs of Pagaruyung officially used the titles Maharaja-Diraja, Sultan, and Yang Dipertuan.

== Feminine forms and usages ==
The feminine form of "King of Kings" is "Queen of Queens", but some female monarchs assumed the title "Queen of Kings", while others simply used the masculine title "King of Kings".

=== King of Kings ===
- In the Alupa dynasty, the female monarch Ballamahadevi used the masculine title maharajadhiraja ("Great King of Kings").
- The queens regnant of the Bhauma-Kara dynasty used the titles Paramabhattarika-Maharajadhiraja-Paramesvari, the feminine form of Paramabhattaraka-Maharajadhiraja-Paramesvara.
- In the Kingdom of Georgia, Tamar assumed both the titles of mepeta-mepe ("King of Kings") and dedopalta-dedopali ("Queen of Queens").

=== Queen of Kings ===
- In the Ptolemaic Kingdom, Cleopatra VII was proclaimed "Queen of Kings" in the Donations of Alexandria.
- In the Ethiopian Empire, the title as an empress-regnant of Zewditu was Nəgəstä Nägäst ("Queen of Kings"). This title is different from Nəgusä Nägäst ("King of Kings"), the title of male emperor, and Itege, the title of empress-consort.

=== Queen of Queens ===
- In the empires of Iran, there was the title Bānbishnān Bānbishn ("Queen of Queens"), matched the title Shahanshah ("King of Kings") and abbreviated as bānbishn. Musa, Boran and Azarmidokht were female monarchs, equivalent in rank to shahanshahs.
- Similarly to her mother Tamar, as Georgia's monarch, Rusudan assumed the title "Queen of Queens".
- According to Georgian charters, the title "Queen of Queens" was used for queens of Kartli and Kakheti.
- According to murals in the Gelati Monastery, the title dedopalta-dedopali ("Queen of Queens") was used for queens of Imereti.
- The title maharaniadhirani ("Great Queen of Queens"), the feminine form of maharajadhiraja, was used for Kam Sundari, the widow of Kameshwar Singh of the Raj Darbhanga.
- Tamar Gurju Khatun, the consort of Kaykhusraw II of the Sultanate of Rum, was titled malikat al-malikāt ("Queen of Queens").
- Hürrem Sultan, the consort of the Ottoman Sultan Suleiman the Magnificent, was addressed in firmans as malikat el-malikāt ("Queen of Queens").

== In religion ==
=== Judaism ===
In Judaism, Melech Malchei HaMelachim ("the King of Kings of Kings") came to be used as a name of God, using the double superlative to put the title one step above the royal title of the Babylonian and Persian kings referred to in the Bible.

=== Christianity ===
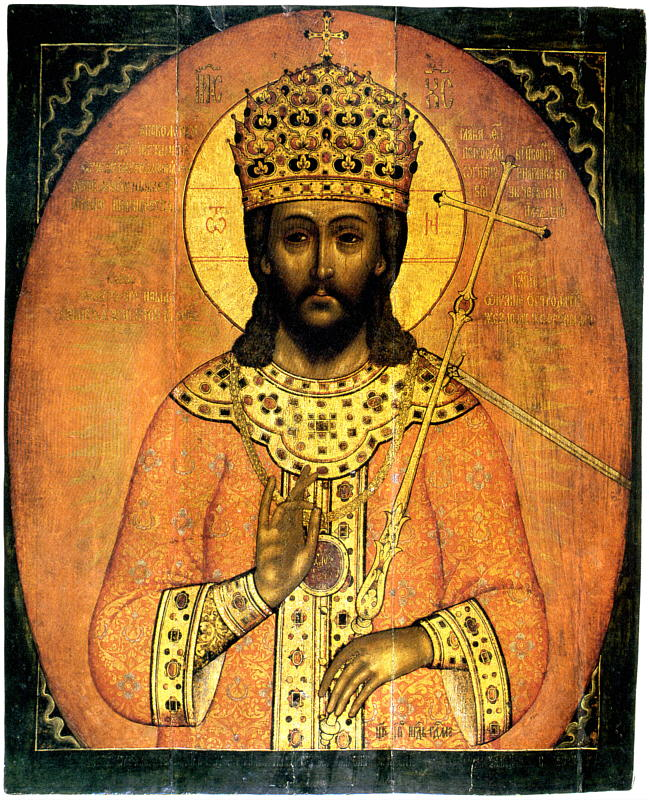
Christ as King of Kings, a Russian icon from Murom, 1690

"King of Kings" (βασιλεὺς τῶν βασιλευόντων) is used in reference to Jesus Christ in the New Testament: once in the First Epistle to Timothy (6:15) and twice in the Book of Revelation (17:14, 19:11–16);

... which He will bring about at the proper time—He who is the blessed and only Sovereign, the King of kings and Lord of lords, ...

— First Epistle to Timothy 6:15

"These will wage war against the Lamb, and the Lamb will overcome them, because He is Lord of lords and King of kings, and those who are with Him are the called and chosen and faithful."

— Book of Revelation 17:14

And I saw heaven opened, and behold, a white horse, and He who sat on it is called Faithful and True, and in righteousness He judges and wages war. His eyes are a flame of fire, and on His head are many diadems; and He has a name written on Him which no one knows except Himself. ... And on His robe and on His thigh He has a name written, "KING OF KINGS, AND LORD OF LORDS."

— Book of Revelation 19:11–12, 16

Some Christian realms (Georgia, Armenia and Ethiopia) employed the title and it was part of the motto of the Byzantine Emperors of the Palaiologan period, Βασιλεὺς Βασιλέων Βασιλεύων Βασιλευόντων (Basileus Basileōn, Basileuōn Basileuontōn, literally "King of Kings, ruling over those who rule"). In the Byzantine Empire the word Βασιλεὺς (Basileus), which had meant "king" in ancient times had taken up the meaning of "emperor" instead. Byzantine rulers translated "Basileus" into "Imperator" when using Latin and called other kings rēx or rēgas (ρήξ, ρήγας), hellenized forms of the Latin title rex.

As such, Βασιλεὺς Βασιλέων in the Byzantine Empire would have meant "Emperor of Emperors". The Byzantine rulers only accorded the title of Basileus onto two foreign rulers they considered to be their equals, the Kings of Axum and the Shahanshahs of the Sasanian Empire, leading to "King of Kings" being equated to the rank of "Emperor" in the view of the West.

=== Islam ===
Following the fall of the Sasanian Empire in 651 AD, the title of Shahanshah was sternly criticized in the Muslim world. It was problematic enough that the adoption of Shahanshah by the Shia Buyid dynasty in Persia required a body of jurists to agree on its lawfulness and the title itself (both as King of Kings and as the Persian variant Shahanshah) is condemned in Sunni hadith, a prominent example being Sahih al-Bukhari Book 73 Hadiths 224 and 225;

Allah's Apostle said, "The most awful name in Allah's sight on the Day of Resurrection, will be (that of) a man calling himself Malik Al-Amlak (the king of kings)."

— Sahih al-Bukhari Book 73 Hadith 224

The Prophet said, "The most awful (meanest) name in Allah's sight." Sufyan said more than once, "The most awful (meanest) name in Allah's sight is (that of) a man calling himself king of kings." Sufyan said, "Somebody else (i.e. other than Abu Az-Zinad, a sub-narrator) says: What is meant by 'King of Kings' is 'Shahanshah."

— Sahih al-Bukhari Book 73 Hadith 225

The condemnation of the title within the Islamic world may stem from that the concept of God alone being king had been prominent in early Islam. Opposing worldly kingship, the use of "King of Kings" was deemed obnoxious and blasphemous.

=== Mandaeism ===
In Mandaeism, the phrase Classical Mandaic: ࡌࡀࡋࡊࡀ ࡖࡊࡅࡋࡅࡍ ࡌࡀࡋࡊࡉࡀ, romanized: malka ḏ-kulhun malkia, lit. 'King of [All] Kings' is used to refer to Hayyi Rabbi (God in Mandaeism) in some prayers, including in Prayer 176 of the Qulasta.

=== Hinduism ===
The Anugita states the “The great Vishnu, full of the Brahman, is the king of kings over all.”

The Shiva Purana describes Shiva as the "lord of all lords."

== Modern usage ==
=== Iran ===
After the end of the Buyid dynasty in 1062, the title of Shahanshah was used intermittently by rulers of Iran until the modern era. The title, rendered as Shahinshah, is used on some of the coins of Alp Arslan (r. 1063–1072), the second sultan of the Seljuk Empire.

The title was adopted by Ismail I (r. 1501–1524), the founder of the Safavid dynasty. Upon his capture of Tabriz in 1501, Ismail proclaimed himself the Shāh of Iran and the Shahanshah of Iran. The term šāhanšāh-e Irān, King of Kings of Iran, is richly attested for the Safavid period and for the preceding Timurid period (when it was not in use). Nader Shah, founder of the later Afsharid Dynasty, assumed the title šāhanšāh in 1739 to emphasize his superiority over Muhammad Shah of the Mughal Empire in India.

The title Shahanshah is also attested for Fath-Ali Shah Qajar of the Qajar dynasty (r. 1797–1834). Fath-Ali's reign was noted for its pomp and elaborate court protocol. An 1813/1814 portrait of Fath-Ali contains a poem with the title; "Is this a portrait of a shahanshah, inhabitant of the skies / Or is it the rising of the sun and the image of the moon?".

The Qajar dynasty was overthrown in 1925, replaced by the Pahlavi dynasty. Both reigning members of this dynasty, Reza Shah Pahlavi (r. 1925–1941) and Mohammad Reza Pahlavi (r. 1941–1979), used the title of Shahanshah, before they were overthrown as part of the 1979 Iranian revolution. Although Mohammad Reza Pahlavi had reigned as Shah for twenty-six years by then, he only took the title of Shahanshah on 26 October 1967 in a lavish coronation ceremony held in Tehran. He said that he chose to wait until this moment to assume the title because in his own opinion he "did not deserve it" up until then. He is also recorded as saying that there was "no honour in being Emperor of a poor country", which he viewed Iran as being until that time.

The current head of the exiled house of Pahlavi, Reza Pahlavi II, symbolically declared himself Shahanshah at the age of 21 after the death of his father in 1980.

=== Libya ===
In 2008, the Libyan leader Muammar Gaddafi was bestowed with the title of "King of Kings" after a gathering of more than 200 African tribal kings and chiefs endorsed his use of the title on 28 August that year, stating that "We have decided to recognise our brotherly leader as the 'king of kings, sultans, princes, sheikhs and mayors of Africa". At the meeting, held in the city of Benghazi, Gaddafi was given gifts including a throne, an 18th-century Qur'an, traditional outfits and ostrich eggs. At the same meeting, Gaddafi urged his guests to put pressure on their own governments and speed the process of moving towards a unified African continent. Gaddafi told those that attended the meeting that "We want an African military to defend Africa, we want a single African currency, we want one African passport to travel within Africa". The meeting was later referred to as a "bizarre ceremony" in international media.
