= Elva (given name) =

Elva is an almost exclusively feminine given name which may refer to:

== Women ==
- Elva Ambía (born 1941), Peruvian educator, Quechua language activist and writer
- Elvira Elva Bascom (1870–1944), American librarian
- Elva Bett (1918–2016), New Zealand artist, art historian and art gallery director
- Elva Blacker (1908–1984), English painter
- Elva Bradley, Fijian international lawn bowler in 1969
- Elva Díaz, American neuroscientist
- Elva Dryer (born 1971), American long-distance runner
- Elva Shartel Ferguson (1869–1947), American newspaper editor
- Elva A. George (c. 1876–1953), American dietitian
- Elva Goulbourne (born 1980), Jamaican long jumper
- Elva Guerra (born 2004), American actress
- Elva Hsiao (born 1979), Taiwanese singer
- Elva Jones, American computer scientist
- Elva Lawton (1896–1993), American botanist and bryologist
- Elva Macías (born 1944), Mexican poet, writer and essayist
- Elva Margariti (born 1980), Albanian architect, urban planner and former Minister of Culture
- Elva Ruby Miller (1907–1997), stage name Mrs. Miller, American singer
- Elva Nampeyo (1926–1985), American studio potter
- Elva Ni (born 1987), Hong Kong actress, model, television presenter and yoga instructor
- Elva Roulet (born 1932), Argentine architect and politician, former Vice Governor of Buenos Aires Province and former Secretary of Housing and Environmental Structuring of Argentina
- Elva Simpson (1936–2009), New Zealand netball player
- Elva Trill (born 1990 or 1991), Irish actress

== Men ==
- Elva R. Kendall (1893–1968), American politician
