= Elva =

Elva may refer to:

== Places ==
- Elva, Manitoba, Canada, an unincorporated community
- Elva, Estonia, a town
- Elva Parish, a municipality in Estonia
- Elva (river), a river in Estonia
- Elva, Piedmont, Italy, a comune
- Elva, Illinois, an unincorporated community in DeKalb County, Illinois, United States

== People ==
- Elva (given name)
- Caniggia Elva (born 1996), Saint Lucian footballer
- Titus Elva (born 1974), Saint Lucian retired footballer
- Elva (cognomen), a branch of the ancient Roman Aebutia family

== Other uses ==
- Elva (album), an album by Unwritten Law
- Elva (Inheritance), a character in the Inheritance Cycle by American novelist Christopher Paolini
- FC Elva, an Estonian football club based in Elva
- Elva (car manufacturer), a defunct British sports car manufacturer
- McLaren Elva, a limited-edition sports car manufactured by McLaren Automotive

== See also ==
- Miss Elva, an album by Elva Hsiao
- Elva C, a Chesapeake Bay deck boat on the National Register of Historic Places
- Elvas (disambiguation)
- Alva (disambiguation)
