= Kadiyali Mahishamardini Temple =

Coordinates: 13°20′50″N 74°45′25″E

- ಕಡಿಯಾಳಿ ಮಹಿಷಮರ್ದಿನಿ ದೇವಸ್ಥಾನ

Religion
- Affiliation: Hinduism
- Deity: Lakshmi as Mahishamardini

Location
- State: Karnataka
- Country: India

Kadiyali Mahishamardini Temple is an ancient Hindu temple located in Kadiyali, near Udupi in Karnataka, India. Dedicated to Mahishamardini (the slayer of the demon Mahishasura) in her gentle form. It is considered one of the oldest surviving shrines in the Tulu Nadu region, with origins dating back to the 7th century CE during the Badami Chalukya era. It is an ancient Durga temple with particularly close historical and ritual ties to Udupi's Madhva Vaishnavas tradition. The temple is managed by Madhva Vaishnava priests.

== History ==
Kadiyali is situated in the historic Tulu Nadu region of coastal Karnataka. According to the temple's traditional history, the name Kadiyali developed from Kadehalli, interpreted as a settlement or village situated at the boundary of Shivalli. The antiquity of the shrine has been associated particularly with the architectural characteristics of its sanctum and the style of its principal image. According to an account citing archaeologist P. Gururaja Bhatt, the image exhibits characteristics associated with the Chalukyas of Badami. Bhatt considered the temple comparable in antiquity to the Anantheshwara Temple at Udupi, traditionally dated to the early medieval period. Another description of the image assigns it to approximately the sixth century CE on iconographic grounds, including the form of its crown, ornaments and vertically positioned trident. The surviving granite sanctum has similarly been considered an early component of the temple. Bhatt attributed its architectural form to the pre-Vijayanagara period. The precise date of the foundation of the temple, however, is uncertain.

=== Kanva tradition ===
A separate local tradition relates the origin of the shrine to Kanva Rishi. According to this account, the site was originally forested and contained a water tank used by ascetics for penance. A Brahmin youth travelling through the area while carrying an image of the goddess stopped beside the tank and placed the image upon a rock. The rock was believed to possess the sannidhya, or divine presence, of the goddess Lakshmi. According to the tradition, contact with the rock transformed the fierce expression of the image into a benign one and caused it to become immovable. Kanva Rishi subsequently consecrated the image at the site. The former tank is traditionally identified with a well situated near the inner sanctum of the present temple.
