= Anantheshwara Temple, Udupi =

Hindu temple in Udupi

Anantheshwara Temple of Udupi
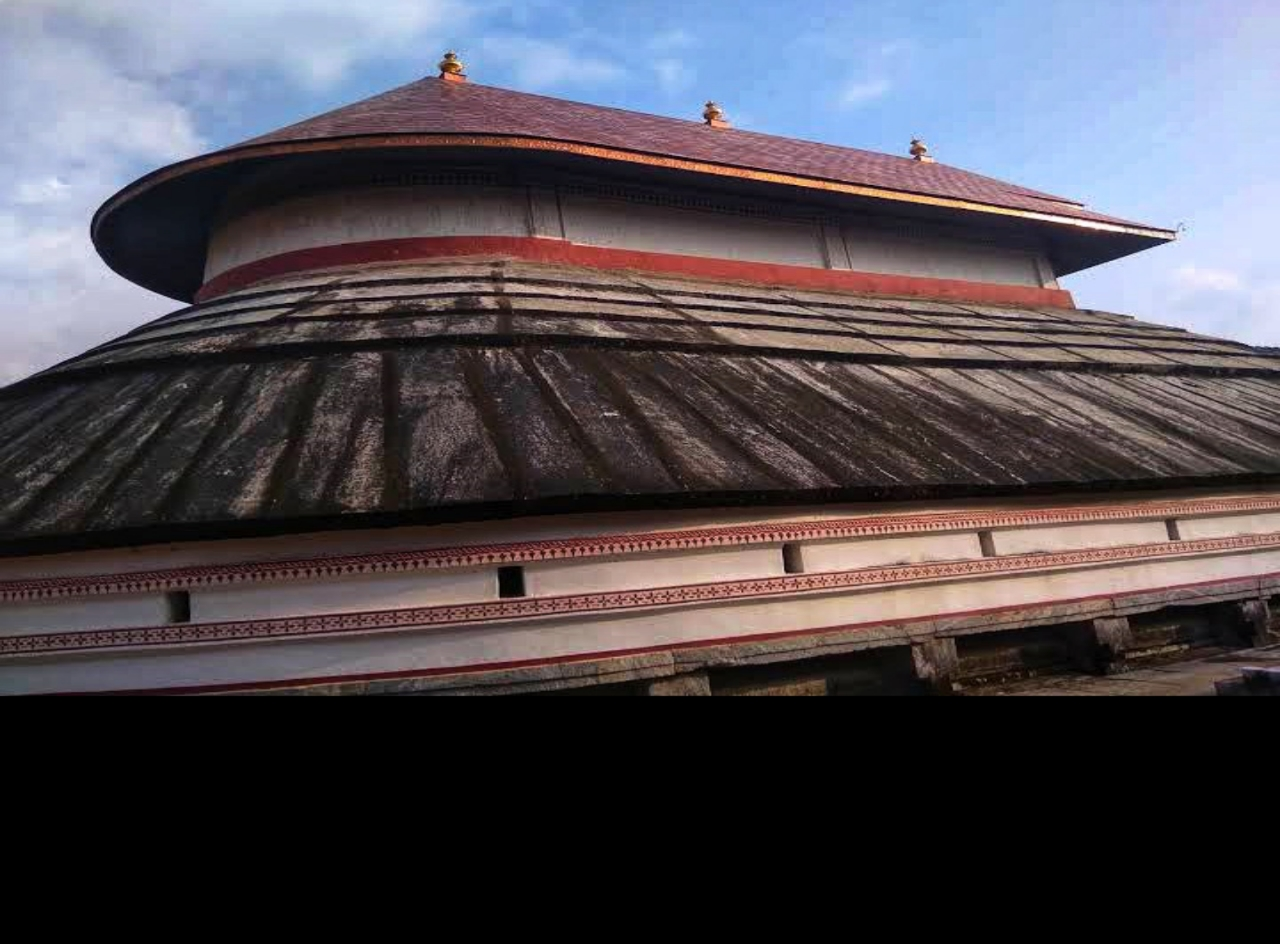

Religion
- Affiliation: Hinduism
- District: Udupi district
- Deity: Shiva

Location
- Location: Udupi
- State: Karnataka
- Country: India

Architecture
- Type: Kerala temple architecture

Udupi Anantheshwara Temple is a Hindu temple dedicated to Hindu god Shiva. The Anantheshwara temple is located in Udupi, India. Writer Roshen Dalal says, "According to texts, the city formed part of Parashurama Kshetra, the area is said to be claimed by Parashurama from the sea. Legends state that a king named Ramabhoja worshipped Shiva here in the form of Linga, which then manifests on a silver seat (rajata pitha). Thus in Sanskrit texts, the city is known as "Rajata Pitha". Madhva Brahmins are priests in this temple. They have been following poojas and rituals in the temples as per Madhva Sampradaya and Tantra Sara Sangraha written by Madhvacharya for the past 700 years.

The temple was built during the reign of the Alupas in the 8th century C.E. and is considered among the oldest in the Tulu Nadu region. The Ananteshwara Temple is close to Chandramouleshwara Temple of Shiva.

The temple is the oldest in Udupi managed by Puttige Matha, one of the Ashta Mathas of Udupi. This is the place where Madhvacharya wrote many of his Tattvavada scripts, taught it to his disciples and got adrushya (disappeared) to Badari to stay along with Vedavyasa.
