= Udyavara =

- Village/Suburb
- Interactive map of Udyavara
- Coordinates: 13°18′35.07″N 74°44′11.88″E
- Country: India
- State: Karnataka
- District: Udupi District

Languages
  - Official: Kannada
- Time zone: UTC+5:30 (IST)
- PIN: 574118
- Telephone code: 0820
- Nearest city: Udupi
- Lok Sabha constituency: Grama Panchayath
- Website: udyavara.com

Udyavara is an ancient port village located 5 km south of Udupi in the Indian state of Karnataka. This town is a regional marine industry and fisheries hub. Fish meal products and fish oils from village Pithrody in Udyavara are exported all across the globe.

Udyavara is gradually becoming a Udupi suburb. National Highway 17, now NH 66, passes through the village.

The river Papanashini flows from east to west and turns north to separate Udyavara and Malpe. The river hosts several islets and its waters are navigable.Illegal sand extraction(mining) is causing damage to the flow of river and its environs.

== History ==
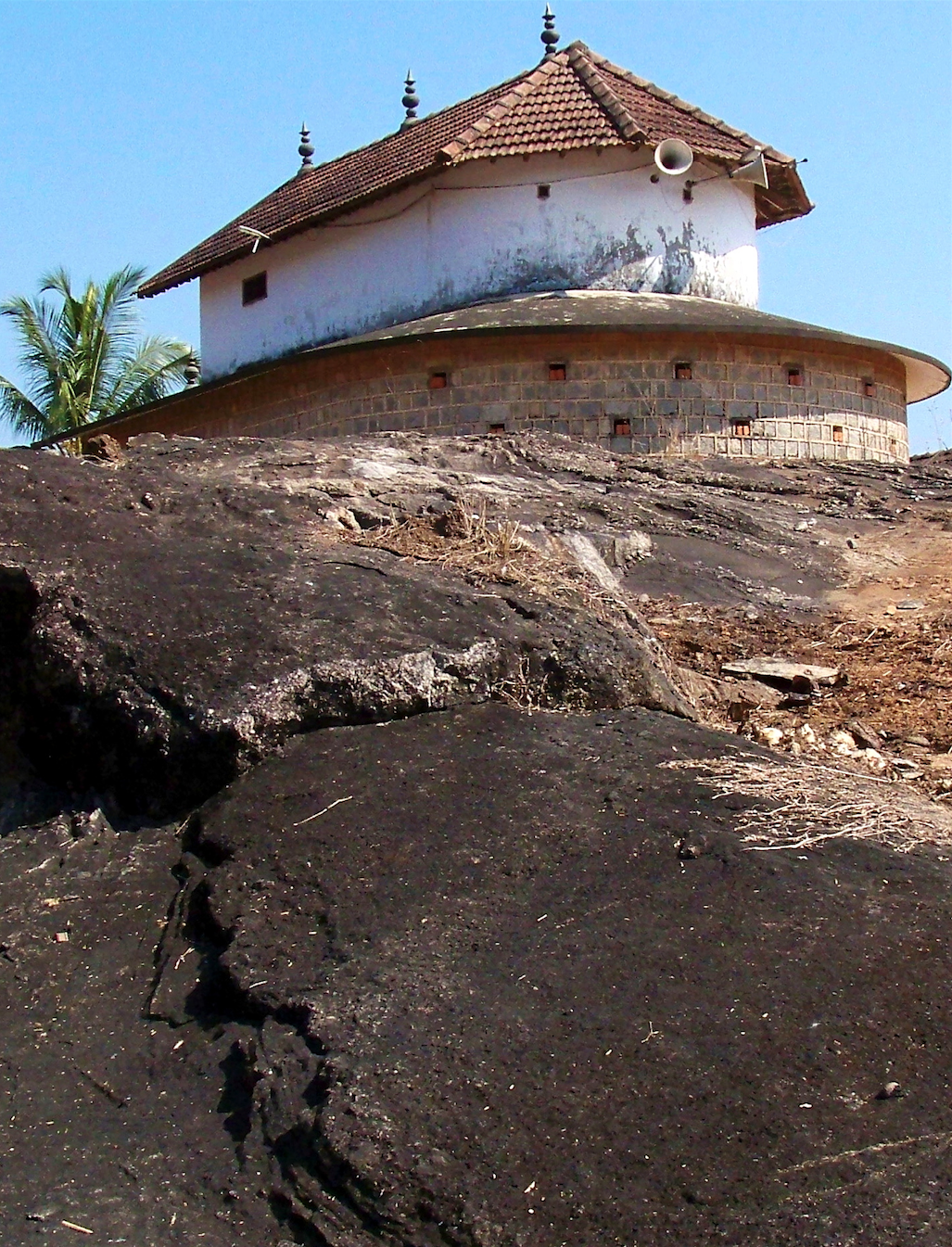
Shambukallu Temple

Udyavara has a rich history, dating from the 3rd and 4th centuries BCE. Test excavations yielded pottery from around that time, and what is perhaps the earliest information about the Jaina Santaras, rulers of Hombuchcha, have been obtained from this place.

Udyavara was one of the earliest capitals of the Alupa dynasty. It was a source of conflict between two factions of the family, becoming a battleground during the 8th and 9th centuries AD. Numerous inscriptions have been reported, providing the earliest epigraphical information about them. During this period Udyavara had two fortifications. The inner wall enclosed a palace, while the outer wall enclosed the town. During the late medieval period the administration of this town was under the Portuguese colony .

The city lost much of its heritage to modern development. Remnants of fort walls, temples and inscriptions document Udyavara's ancient glory.

HOLY PLACES

- Veera Bhadra Durgaparameshwari
- Siddhi Vinayaka Temple
- Siddiq -E-Akbar Jamia Masjid,
- UBM Christha Shanthi Church,
- St.Francis Xavier church
- Shambu kallu Shiva Temple
- Sri Veera Vittala Temple: Situated in Matadangadi, is one of the oldest temples from GSB community in Udupi.

== Education ==
B.E.M Primary school, Hindu Primary School and St Francis Xavier school are in the village.

An Ayurveda college is located nearby the village.

== Tourist attractions ==
Tourist attractions include Udyavara river and Pithrody beach.
