= Alva (given name) =

Alva is a unisex given name. It is used in Sweden and Norway as a feminine form of the name Alf, meaning "elf." It is also a spelling variant of the Biblical masculine name Alvah, meaning "his highness." Alva is a currently popular name in Sweden, where it was ranked among the ten most popular names given to newborn girls in 2012. Notable people with the name include:

== Men ==
- Alva Adams (governor) (1850–1922), Governor of Colorado
- Alva B. Adams (1875–1941), U.S. Senator from Colorado, son of the governor
- Alva Baptiste, Saint Lucian politician
- Alva Ted Bonda (1917–2005), president and part-owner of the Cleveland Indians Major League Baseball team
- Alva Bradley (1884–1953), American businessman and baseball executive
- Alva M. Cummins (1869–1946), American lawyer
- Alva Duer (1904–1987), American college basketball coach
- Alva R. Fitch (1907–1989), United States Army lieutenant general
- Alva Clark Forney (1871–1956), Lieutenant Governor of South Dakota
- Alva Garey (1883–1971), American politician
- Alva L. Hager (1850–1923), three-term U.S. Representative from Iowa
- Alva L. Kitselman, American businessman from Muncie, Indiana.
- Alva Johnston (disambiguation), several people
  - Alva Johnston (journalist) (1888–1950), American journalist
  - Alva Johnston (politician) (1872–1953), American politician from Nebraska
- Alva Kelley (1918–1999), American college football player and coach
- Alva Liles (1956–1998), American football player
- Alva M. Lumpkin (1886–1941), U.S. Senator from South Carolina for less than a month
- Alva Hugh Maddox (1930–2020), justice of the Supreme Court of Alabama
- Alva Noë (born 1964), American philosopher and cognitive scientist
- Alva Allie Paine (1919–2008), American basketball player
- Alva Ross (1928–2004), Jamaican politician

== Women ==
- Alva Belmont (1853–1933), American socialite and suffragette
- Alva Challis (1930–2010), Welsh-born New Zealand geologist
- Alva Colquhoun (1942–2025), Australian swimmer
- Alva C. Ellisor (1892–1964), American geologist, one of the first female stratigraphers in North America
- Alva Forsius (1866–1935), Finnish midwife, social worker and a founding member of the Finnish Salvation Army
- Alva Myrdal (1902–1986), Swedish sociologist, diplomat and politician, Nobel Peace Prize winner

== Fictional characters ==
- Gunnery Sergeant Alva Bricker, on the American sitcom Major Dad
- Alva Lorenz, a hunter in the video game Identity V
- Alva, in the miniseries Islands
- Alva, a tactical android in the video game Girls' Frontline 2: Exilium
