= Eraclio Zepeda =

Mexican writer and politician (1937–2015)

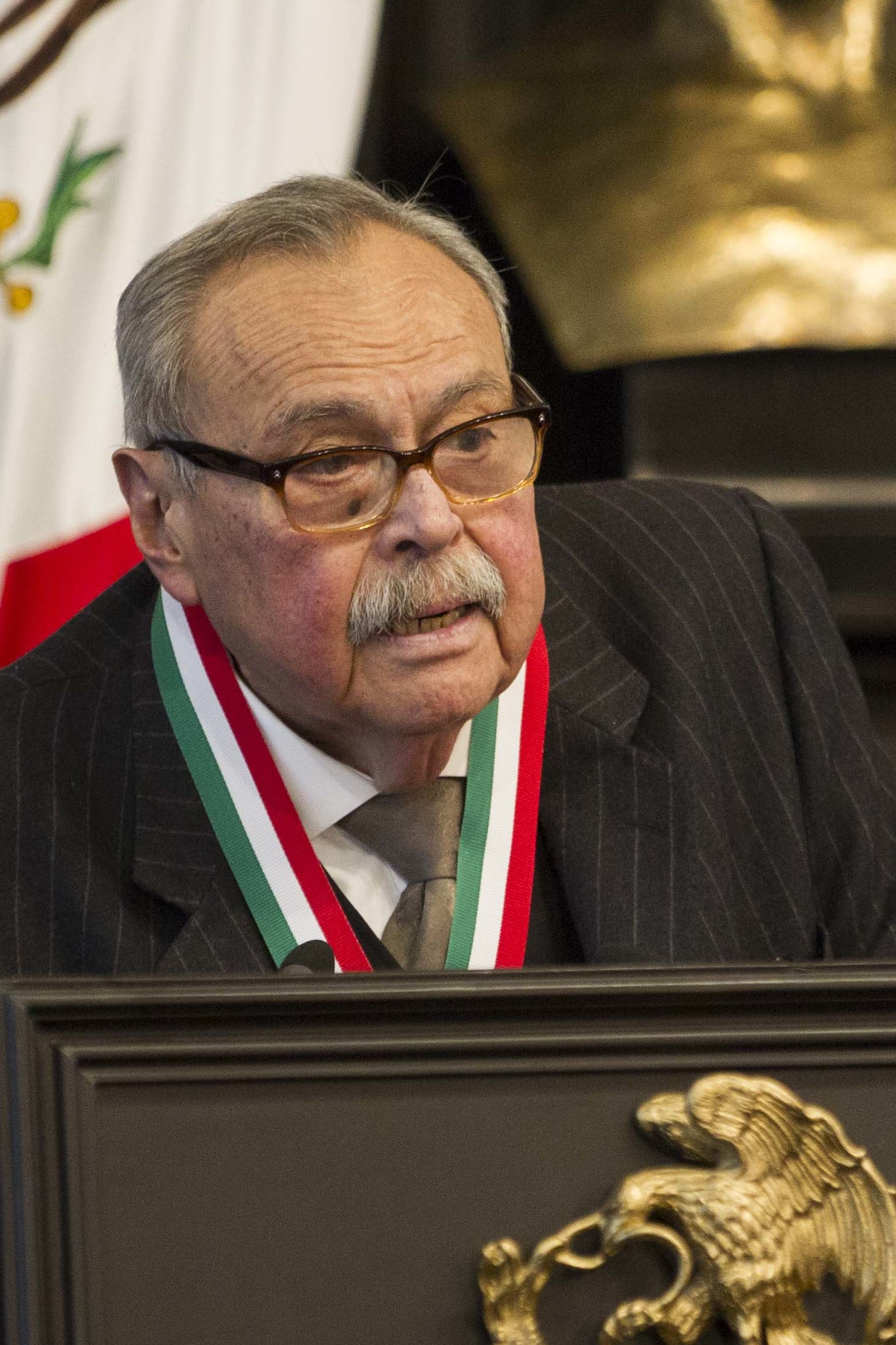
- Born: Eraclio Zepeda Ramos; March 24, 1937; Tuxtla Gutierrez, Chiapas
- Died: September 17, 2015 (aged 78); Tuxtla Gutierrez, Chiapas
- Education: Social Anthropology
- Alma mater: Universidad Veracruzana
- Occupations: Writer; politician; poet; actor
- Spouse: Elva Macías
- Writing career
- Language: Spanish
- Notable awards: Xavier Villaurrutia Award (1982) Belisario Domínguez Medal of Honor (2014)

Eraclio Zepeda (March 24, 1937 – September 17, 2015) was a Mexican writer, poet and politician.

== Education ==
He attended college at the Universidad Militarizada Latinoamericana, where he started a Marxism study group with Jaime Labastida, Jaime Augusto Shelley and Nils Castro. He read Social Anthropology at Universidad Veracruzana, where he joined leftist political groups, which reflects on his literary works.

In 1960 he attended the first Youth Latin America Congress in Cuba and during the Bay of Pigs Invasion he enrolled as a soldier with Carlos Jurado, Nils Castro, and Roque Dalton, being named the official responsible for the Combat Special Unit.

== Career ==
=== Teaching ===
Zepeda was a teacher at the San Cristóbal de las Casas's Preparatory School as well its law school in 1957. He taught at Universidad Veracruzana from 1958 to 1960, at Cuba's Universidad de Oriente in 1961 and one year later at the Universidad de La Habana, as well as at the Escuela de Instructores de Arte de La Habana and the Instituto de Lenguas Extranjeras de Pekín.

Eraclio Zepeda created the Compañía Nacional de Subsistencias Populares rural orientation group in 1967, founded the Teatro de Orientación Campesina (Theatre of Rural Orientation), where he would produce the radio soap opera San Martín de la Piedra; and founded the newspaper El Correo Campesino.

=== Politics ===
He participated in a series of movements against the governor of Chiapas, Efraín Aranda Osorio, because of his actions of social dissolution. from 1958 to 1959, Zepeda was a member of the Rural Worker's Party, and then moved on to the Mexican Communist Party, the party that would be most active from 1969 to 1981. In the MCP, he was a member of the central committee and the political correspondent commission in Moscow called "La Voz de México" ("The Voice of Mexico").

He was cofounder and a member of the central committee of the Unified Socialist Party of Mexico and of the Mexican Socialist Party, being a candidate for the presidency and a candidate for senator of Chiapas. He was federal deputy of the USPM in the LIII Legislature of the Congress of Mexico. In 1989, he was cofounder and a member of the warranty commission of the Party of the Democratic Revolution. Between December 1994 and April 1997, he was secretary of government in the state of Chiapas, with governors Eduardo Robledo Rincón and Julio César Ruiz Ferro.

== Awards and honors ==
- Commemorative Medal of the National Indigenist Institute in 1980.
- Premio Xavier Villaurrutia for Andando el tiempo in 1982.
- Member of the Sistema Nacional de Creadores de Arte since 1994.
- Belisario Domínguez Medal of Honor, 2014.
- National Prize for Arts in the Linguistics and literature category, awarded by the Secretaría de Educación Pública in 2014.

== Works ==
=== Short stories ===
- Benzulul (1959)
- Asalto nocturno (1979)
- Ratón-que-vuela (1989)
- Horas de vuelo (2001)
- Quien dice la verdad

=== Novels ===
- Las grandes lluvias (2005)
- Tocar el fuego (2007)
- Sobre esta tierra.
- Viento del siglo.

=== Plays ===
- El tiempo y el agua (1960)

=== Poems ===
- La espiga amotinada (1960)
- Ocupación de la palabra (1965)
- Elegía a Rubén Jaramillo (1963)
