= Elvas (disambiguation) =

Elvas may refer to:

- Elvas, Portugal, a municipality in Portugal.
- the former Diocese of Elvas, a historical bishopric (1571-1882), now a Latin titular see.
- Castle of Elvas (known as Castelo de Elvas in Portuguese), a Portuguese castle.
- Rádio Elvas, Alto Alentejo's Local radiostation, Portugal.
- Elvas River, a river of Minas Gerais state in southeastern Brazil.
- O Elvas C.A.D., a football club based in Portalegre, Alentejo.
- Cancioneiro de Elvas (in English: Elvas Songbook), one of the four Renaissance songbooks of Portuguese music from the 16th century
- Battle of the Lines of Elvas, was fought on 14 January 1659, in Elvas, between Portugal and Spain.
- Treaty of Elvas
- Elvas Freeway

== See also ==
- Elva (disambiguation)
