= Elva Macias =

Mexican poet

Elva Macías Grajales (born January 10, 1944, Villaflores, Chiapas) is a Mexican poet, writer and essayist.

Elva Macías was born on January 10, 1944, in Villaflores, where she lived until she was twelve years old, at which time she went to study in Mexico City. In 1963 Macías escaped to China with Eraclio Zepeda, her husband. Macías and Zepeda spent two years in China during which she worked as a Spanish teacher. After these two years they moved to Moscow, where Macías studied at the Moscow State University and specialized in Russian literature and letters. Macías' most significant relationship in the literary world, with the exception of her husband, is with the poet Elsa Cross, whom she defined as her "fundamental literary friendship".

== Work outside writing ==
Macías is recognized mainly for her work in poetry, however, she has held several other positions. Macías has been: cultural diffuser of the UNAM where she held the sub-directorate of Casa del Lago and INBA in Chiapas, director of Museo del Chopo, publisher of the Voz Viva record series in Mexico and Voz Viva in Latin America, member of the advisory board of the literary magazines; Plural and Literary Discourse, Journal of the University of Memphis and ICACH Magazine.

== Recognition and honours ==
- 1969, Second place in the "National Story Contest of the Universidad Veracruzana".
- 1971, CME poetry scholar.
- 1993, Chiapas Literature Award Rosario Castellanos.
- 1994, National Prize of Poetry Carlos Pellicer For Work Published by Ciudad contra el cielo.
- 1996, The Center of Studies of Baccalaureate of Tecpatán, Chiapas, zoque community, inaugurated the Library "Elva Macías Grajales".
- 1999, She was Special Guest of the III Colloquium of Feminine Literature of the Autonomous University of Ciudad Juárez.
- 2000, Entered the SNCA.
- 2002, The Ramón López Velarde Poetry Festival of Zacatecas, Tenth issue, was dedicated to the works of Elva Macías, Elsa Cross and Gloria Gervitz.
- 2002, Presea Ramón López Velarde
- 2003, He received the "Canary Knife", in the sixteenth edition of the Festival del Sur-Theatrical Meeting Three Continents, in Agüimes, Canary Islands, Spain.
- 2003, The magazine Diturna de Morelia, Michoacán dedicated a dossier and a plaquette in insert, number 11, March–April.
- 2012, Poetas del Mundo Latino International Award Víctor Sandoval.
- 2017, Ramón López Valverde Iberoamerican Award.
