= Elva A. George =

American dietitian

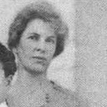
- in 1918
- Born: Elva Anne George about 1876
- Died: January 14, 1953; Miami, Florida
- Occupation: dietitian
- Known for: first director of the Bureau of Dietitan Service, American Red Cross

Elva Anne George (born about 1876 – died January 14, 1953), sometimes seen as Alva A. George, was an American dietitian, director of the Bureau of Dietitian Service of the American Red Cross during World War I.

== Early life ==
George was the daughter of Thomas Crosslet George and Christine Oberg George. Her brother Sidney Gonzales George was an engineering professor at Cornell University. She attended Pratt Institute, graduating from the course in Food Economics in 1903.

== Career ==
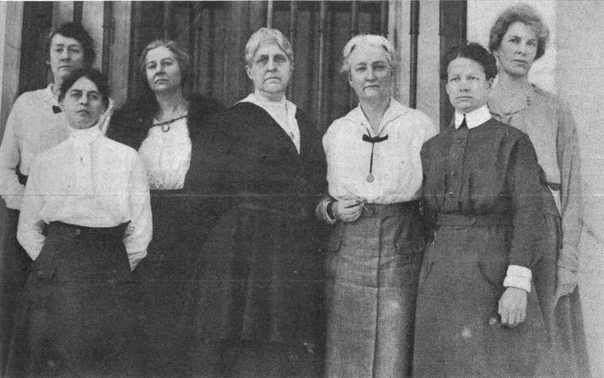
Chief Executives of the American Red Cross Department of Nursing in 1918; Elva A. George is first from the right

George worked as a dietitian in New York before World War I. She was elected president of the New York Association of Dietitians in 1917. That same year, George was chosen as director of the Bureau of Dietitian Service of the American Red Cross, a chief executive position in the American Red Cross Department of Nursing. Her responsibilities included recruiting dietitians for Red Cross service at home and abroad, and as instructors in "home dietetics". She was also secretary of the Red Cross's National Committee on Dietitian Service.

She resigned as director in July 1919, succeeded by Margaret Sawyer. She returned to New York to work as head of housekeeping at Barnard College, and later in the Department of Public Welfare in that state. She retired as chief dietitian at Kings County Hospital in 1942.

== Personal life ==
In retirement, George moved to Miami, Florida. She died there in 1953, aged 76.
