= Alva (surname) =

Indian surname with historical Jain associations

Alva is a surname found primarily among Tulu-speaking communities of coastal Karnataka, India. The name is historically associated with Hindu Bunt and Jain Bunts chieftains, feudal families, and landholding elites in the Tulunadu region, though over time it has also been adopted by families of other faith.

The surname Alva is believed to derive from the Old Tulu term Alva meaning "chief" or "landlord." In medieval inscriptions, Alva often appears as an honorific title for Bunt administrators and feudatories under Jain rulers.

The surname Alva is also found in Western countries, where it is of Portuguese origin, derived from a place of habitation.

== Historical associations ==
Medieval inscriptions from the coastal Karnataka region, particularly those related to the Alupa dynasty, record several Alva families as Jain patrons. These families were notable for their support of Jain temples, basadis, and manuscript preservation. One prominent branch, the Moodbidri Alvas, were hereditary patrons of the Saavira Kambada Basadi (Thousand Pillar Basadi), a major Jain pilgrimage site.

The Alvas are believed to have been originally Jains. From the 16th to 18th centuries, many Alva families converted from Jainism to Hinduism while retaining the Alva surname. Today, the surname Alva is most common in the districts of Dakshina Kannada and Udupi, with diaspora communities in Mumbai, Bengaluru, and overseas. While a significant number of Alvas remain Hindus and Jains.

== Notable people ==
The following is a list of notable people with last name Alva.

- A. Shanker Alva (1906–1977), Indian politician and lawyer
- Bartolomé de Alva (born 1590s), Novohispanic mestizo secular priest and Nahuatl translator
- Jeevaraj Alva (1947–2001), Indian politician
- Joachim Alva (1907–1979), Indian freedom fighter, journalist and politician
- K. Nagappa Alva (1908–1996), Indian politician
- Leonel Mário d'Alva (1974–1975), Prime Minister of São Tomé and Príncipe
- Luigi Alva (1927–2025), Peruvian opera singer
- Margaret Alva (born 1942), first woman governor of the Indian state of Uttarakhand, daughter-in-law of Joachim Alva
- Piero Alva (born 1979), Peruvian footballer
- Ramón Alva de la Canal (1892–1985), Mexican painter and illustrator
- Tony Alva (born 1957), American skateboarder, entrepreneur, and musician
- Violet Alva (1908–1969), Indian politician, wife of Joachim Alva
- Walter Alva (born 1951), Peruvian archaeologist

== Bibliography ==
- Jaini, Padmanabh S. (1979). The Jaina Path of Purification. Berkeley: University of California Press. ISBN 978-0-520-03675-8.
- Nagarajaiah, Hampa (1999). Jainism in Karnataka: History, Art and Literature. Bangalore: Jaganmohan Palace Publications.
- Nagarajaiah, Hampa (2003). A History of Jainism in Karnataka. Bangalore: Kannada Sahitya Parishat.
- Dundas, Paul (2002). The Jains (2nd ed.). London: Routledge. ISBN 978-0-415-26605-5. OCLC 248345708.
