= Roshen Dalal =

Indian historian and writer (born 1952)

- Born: 1952 (age 73–74); Mussoorie, India
- Education: University of Bombay (BA); Jawaharlal Nehru University (MA & PhD)
- Occupations: Historian, Writer
- Known for: Ancient Indian History

Roshen Dalal (born 1952) is an Indian historian and writer of books for adults and children on the history of India and its religions.

== Biography ==
Roshen Dalal was born in 1952 in Mussoorie, India.

She studied in various schools across the country. After a BA (Hons) in history from the University of Bombay, she completed an MA and PhD in Ancient Indian History from Jawaharlal Nehru University, New Delhi.

She has taught at both school and university, and has been involved in research in the fields of Indian history, religion and philosophy, and education.

She lives in Dehradun.

== Selected publications ==
- The Puffin History of India (2 vols) Penguin Books India, 1997.
- The Religions of India: A Concise Guide to Nine Major Faiths. Penguin books. 2010 [2006]. ISBN 978-0-14-341517-6.
- Hinduism: An Alphabetical Guide Penguin Books India, 2010.
- The Compact Timeline History of the World. Worth Press. 2010. ISBN 978-1-903025-95-6.
- The Vedas: An Introduction to Hinduism's Sacred Texts. Penguin Books India. 2014. ISBN 978-0-143-06638-5.
- The Puffin History of the World (2 vols) Penguin Books India, 2014.
- India at 70. India Puffin. 2017. ISBN 978-0-14-342871-8.
- The 108 Upanishads: an introduction. Penguin Books India. 2018. ISBN 978-0-143-42859-6.
