= Ballamahadevi =

Alupan queen regnant

Ballamahadevi (died 1285) was the queen regnant of the Alupa dynasty in 1275–1292.

She was born in the family of Manabharanesvara. She was married to king Vlrapandyadeva. In 1275, she was widowed. She succeeded to the throne together with her minor son king Nagadevarasa. She was not merely the regent during the minority of her son; the inscriptions clearly state that she succeeded her spouse as a full monarch in her own right, and was the co-monarch of her son.

She used the masculine title of Maharajadhiraja and all the sovereign titles used by the Alupas. She was also titled the mistress of the Western Sea and Pandya-Chakravarti. An inscription from 1277 records the gifts by the queen to the goddess Niruvara-Bhagavati. She ruled from her principal palace at Barahakanyapura with all her ministers (samasta-pradhanaru), the desi-purushas, the bahattara-niyogis and the priests.
