= Alva Forsius =

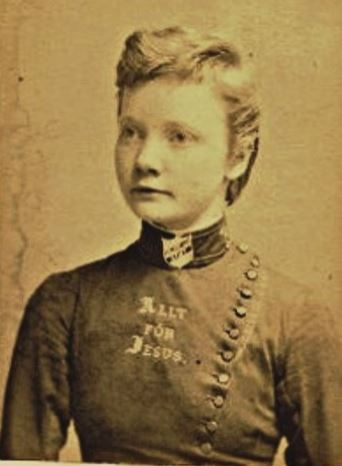
- Salvation Army portrait, 1890
- Born: 24 May 1866; Porvoon maalaiskunta, Grand Duchy of Finland, Russian Empire
- Died: 14 July 1935 (aged 69); Porvoo, Finland
- Occupations: midwife, social worker
- Years active: 1889–1929

Alva Forsius (24 May 1866 – 14 July 1935) was a Finnish midwife and social worker. One of the founding members of the Finnish Salvation Army, she became aware of the effects of poverty and unsanitary conditions for new mothers. She established the first maternity home in Porvoo, published materials to educate women on childbirth and sanitation, and provided counseling for new mothers. Recognizing the needs of unwed mothers, she established one of the first homes to offer single mothers training and follow-up care so that they were able to provide for both the health and economic welfare of their families. Raising three foster daughters, as a single parent, she dedicated her time to helping mothers and children. In later life, she established a private retirement home for women.

== Early life ==
Alva Forsius was born on 24 May 1866 on a farm in Porvoon maalaiskunta in what was the Grand Duchy of Finland of the Russian Empire to Hulda Aurora Hollmérus and Johan Wilhelm Forsius. She was the second child in a family of twelve children. She attended the Porvoo Girls' School, completing her certificate in 1884 and then entered a two-year course in handicrafts at the Helsinki Teacher Training Center, as well as a course at the Helsinki School of Chemistry.

== Career ==
Forsius began her career at the Porvoo Women's Crafts School, teaching sewing machine use. She moved to Helsinki and grew concerned about the poverty in her neighborhood. Having a strong desire to help others, she became a pioneer in establishing the Finnish Salvation Army. The original idea of the organization came from Baroness Louise af Forselles, who recruited Forsius, Hedvig von Haartman, and Constantin Boije af Gennäs and his wife to help her organize a Finnish branch in late 1888. The group left in April 1889 to travel to England and study to become rescue officers and returned after a six-month training period. Forsius spent a decade in the service and trained as a midwife before she resigned from the organization to focus on obstetrics in 1898.

On 17 April 1895, Forsius had graduated as a midwife from the Helsinki Obstetrics Hospital and began working throughout the countryside surrounding Porvoo. On 10 September 1898 she graduated from a technical course on the use of equipment to facilitate births and decided to open a private maternity clinic in Porvoo which offered safe and hygienic conditions for expectant mothers. Her facility offered five beds, and received a city subsidy for providing services to the women of the community. It was the first maternity hospital in Porvoo. Quickly she outgrew the facility and began planning a larger maternal home, which opened in 1902. The new facility had twelve beds and the city subsidy was increased accordingly. In addition to a safe birthing environment, mothers were given instruction on childcare and hygiene. Each mother who left the facility received information on formula for increasing baby-birth weights and sterilized bottles. In spite of the help she was able to give, Forsius felt that inadequate help was given, as there was not enough time in a lying-in facility for sufficient counseling or training, and she was moved by the plight of unwed mothers who were rejected by society. She also took in three of the children born at her facility, Anna Sofia (1900–1924), Marta Bernhardine (1905–?) and Eva Elisabet (1912–2014). She took in Anna as a foster child, but legally adopted Marta and Eva in 1929.

In 1910, Forsius put the maternity hospital up for sale, but it was two years before a buyer was actually found. In the meantime, she began work on developing an unwed mother's home. Her plan called for expectant mothers to receive nutritional help before the birth and then remain at the facility for up to six months after their child's birth so that they could receive education and training to provide for their family welfare during their stay and follow-up visits for up to three years after the child's birth to offer additional assistance. She purchased a lot and built a large building which had four bedrooms, a parlor, a children's playroom, a dining room, office, kitchen and three balconies. Though she solicited donations, she was unable to furnish the structure and negotiated with the Salvation Army to run the home. She named the facility "Solhem" and it opened in 1914 at the beginning of World War I, as one of the first facilities of its kind in the country. Mothers were charged a small fee, but most could not pay and were taught to make handicrafts and sell them to cover the costs. They grew their own food and shared communally in the chores to keep the home running.

Over the next several years, Forsius focused on raising her daughters and continued publishing. She had published her first work, I väntade dagar, några enkla råd för blifvande mödrar (In coming days, some simple advice for future mothers) as a guide for expectant mothers in 1899. It was reprinted in 1900 and 1901 with variations in the title, and was a detailed and practical guide giving information on abortion, breast care, childbirth, exercise, illness, miscarriage, nutrition, and sanitation. In 1922, she published a volume of poetry, Fosterbarnen (Foster children) dedicated to her children. Both the Finnish and Swedish language versions quickly sold out and it was reprinted the following year. Two years later, in 1924, her first daughter, Anna, who had trained as a nurse, died. She published many articles on childbirth and an annual report Barnbörd shuset i Borgå (Childbirth statistics in Porvoo), which gave the numbers of patients treated, length of treatment, illnesses and number of babies born.

In 1925, Forsius founded a facility to care for aging women called sivistyneiden naisten vanhainkotia (Sophisticated Aging Women's Home) as there were very few private retirement homes in Finland. Some existed to care for those who were too poor to maintain themselves, but there were no facilities for those who could care for themselves but were unable to live totally independently in Porvoo.

== Death and legacy ==
Forsius died on 14 July 1935 in Porvoo, Finland and was buried in the Näsin Cemetery. In 2013, the Alva Forsius Memorial Association was founded to preserve her memory and foster scholarship on her work. In 2016, the City of Porvoo held multiple events in honor of the 150th Anniversary of her birth. As part of those festivities, a statue in her honor was erected in Porvoo in 2016. "Solhemi", the home she established for unwed mothers, was turned into a kindergarten in 1957 and is one of the three surviving farms which had been operated by the Salvation Army in the country.
