= Alupa dynasty =

Ruling dynasty of India

Alupa Dynasty
- 200–1444
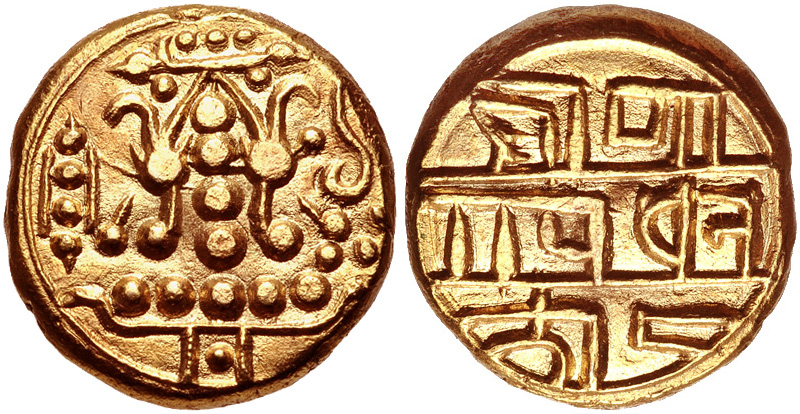
- Coinage of the Alupas. Uncertain ruler, Chattopadhyaya Type II. Legend śri pa/ndya dhana/jaya in Devanagari. 14th century CE

- The Alupas and neighbouring South Asian polities c. 600 CE.
- Status: Kingdom
- Capital: Mangalore, Udyavara, Barkur
- Common languages: Tulu, Kannada
- Administrative Language: Kannada, Sanskrit
- Religion: Hinduism, Jainism
- Government: Monarchy
- Pandya-Chakravarti
- History
  - Established: 200
  - Disestablished: 1444
Succeeded by
Chowta dynasty (Tulu Nadu)
- Today part of: Republic of India

The Alupa dynasty was an Indian dynasty that ruled from 200 to 1444 A.D. in Southern India. They were local feudatories at different times under major dynasties such as the Kadambas, Chalukyas, Rashtrakutas and later Vijaynagara. The kingdom they ruled was known as Alvakheda Arusasira, and its territory spanned the coastal districts of the modern Indian state known as Karnataka, including Kasaragod district of present-day Kerala. The Alupas played a significant role in the political, cultural, and religious history of coastal Karnataka.

== Etymology ==
The name of the dynasty is variously recorded in inscriptions as Alupa, Aluva, Alva, Aluka, and Alapa. The origin of Alupas prior to the Kadambas is unclear, as there is no epigraphical evidence. Ptolemy, the 2nd-century geographer, identifies the Alvakheda as Olokhoira, which is widely believed to be a corruption of the term Alva Kheda, 'the land of the Alvas.

In the Tulu language, ಆಳ್ಪು (Alup) means 'to rule', ಆಳ್ಪುನು (Alupunu) means 'ruling', ಆಳುಪೆ / ಆಳ್ಪೆ / ಆಳ್ಪುನಾಯೆ (Alupe) means 'ruler' (one who rules). According to B. A. Saletore, the name Alupa may be derived from its variant Aluka, which is an epithet of the divine serpent Shesha of Hindu epics. Fleet has suggested that the name Aluka could denote the Nāga Because it represent Jain Yakshini Padamavti the yakshini of Parshwanatha, who in early times were included in Chalukya dominions. Saletore further adds that the Naga or Jain origin of the Alupas is proved by two facts. The figure of a hooded serpent, which is found in an effaced Alupa stone inscription around Mangalore, Saletore dismisses the idea regarding the Dravidian origin of the name from the Tulu word Alunu, meaning 'to rule' or 'govern'.

== History ==
The Alupas in their prime were an independent dynasty, centuries after reigning due to the dominance of Kadambas from Banavasi, they became feudatories to them. Later, they became the vassals of the Chalukyas, Rashtrakutas, and Hoysalas with the change in the political scenario of Southern India. Their influence over coastal Karnataka lasted for about 1200 years. It has been pointed out that the Alupas do not appear to have adopted the law of matrilineal inheritance (Appekatt/Aliyasantana) system at any time during their existence as a royal family where the only instance in the long list of known Alupa rulers is the reign of nephew "Aliya" Kulasekhara Bankideva (son of Alupa princess Krishnayitayi and Hoysala Veera Ballala III) succeeding Soyideva - which is considered as only a challenge to those who had succeeded to the throne by the universal law of direct succession. The last Alupa king to have ruled is Kulasekharadeva Alupendradeva, whose inscription dated 1444 CE has been found in Mudabidri Jain Basadi.

=== Political history ===
The history of the clan emerges from obscurity during the rise of Badami Chalukya in the Aihole and Mahakuta inscriptions, which claim the Alupas had accepted Chalukya overlordship and had become their feudatory. They ruled initially from Mangalore and at other times from Udyavara in Udupi and later from Barkur. Their first regular full-length inscription, the Vaddarase inscription in Kannada, is dated to the early 7th century. They maintained marital relations with their overlords over the centuries.

=== Coinage ===
The Alupas, as a feudatory of the Western Chalukyas in coastal Karnataka, issued coins with Kannada and Nagari inscriptions on them. Coins with Kannada legends seem to have been minted in Mangalorem and those with Nagari legends at the Udupi mint. Kannada was their language of administration. The Pagodas and Fanams were the common coinage of all the Alupa kings. The obverse of the coins carried the royal emblem "Two Fishes" and the reverse had the legend "Sri Pandya Dhanamjaya" either in Nagari or old (Hale) Kannada.

== Origin ==
Historian P. Gururaja Bhat states that the Alupa royal family were possibly of local origin who were followers of Jainism and are identified as Jain bunts Whereas, B. A. Saletore mentions that the title Alupa (Alva) survives till this day in the Bunt community While Alva's were originally Jains, Some sections later adopted Hinduism though title continues to be used. Alupa royal family recorded to have maintained matrimonial alliances with The Santara dynasty and are both adherents of Jainism.

The rule over Uttara Kannada region, with Banavasi as its capital was by the Chutu clan followed by the Shatavahana branch which governed for Siri, Siva, Pulumavi and Yajna Satakarnis, prior to the Kadambas. With the Kadambas rule from Banavasi, Karnataka saw developments in the field of art and culture. Land of Karnataka saw more and more epigraphs that recorded the activities of the past, mostly erected in the temple premises. The first clear mention of Alupas comes from the Halmidi inscription of 450 CE where their possible early ruler Pashupathi of Alapa (Alupa) gana is mentioned. Pashupathi was the contemporary of the Kadambas. Hence for historical record, we can safely assume that the dynastic formation of Alupas took place around 5th century CE. Their royal emblem was the double fish and they claimed to belong to the Pandyavamsha and Soma Kula (lunar dynasty).

Inscriptional evidence from the Tulu region suggests that the Alupas were originally patrons of Jainism, as numerous inscriptions across the region record grants and activities related to the faith. Notably, an inscription at Moodabidri records that King Kulashekhara Alupendra ruled the Tulu region while seated on a throne within a local Jain basadi.

=== Descendants ===
The descendants of this dynasty still survive to this date and have spread in the karavali region and they are widely referred to as the Bunt. The Bunts follow Matrilineality instead of the common Patrilineality, and are said to be Nagavanshi Jain Kshatriyas by their maternal origin. They can be identified with their surnames such as Shetty, Rai, Hegde, Alva, Chowta etc. Even though most Bunt are Hindus by faith now, The sizeable section of the community still follows Jainism and they are called Jain Bunt

== Territories ==
Although Alupas controlled part of Uttara Kannada and Shimoga of Karnataka and northern part of Kerala during the zenith, the core region consisted of the Old Dakshina Kannada district which comprises Modern Dakshina Kannada district and Udupi district. In the ancient times, the region was referred as Alvakheda and during the later part of the reign, the region between Swarna River and chandragiri river was referred as Tulunadu. The term Tulunadu is still practised today while referring to the region.

== Territories ==
Although Alupas controlled part of Uttara Kannada and Shimoga of Karnataka and northern part of Kerala during the zenith, the core region consisted of the Old Dakshina Kannada district which comprises Modern Dakshina Kannada district and Udupi district. In the ancient times, the region was referred as Alvakheda and during the later part of the reign, the region between Swarna River and chandragiri river was referred as Tulunadu. The term Tulunadu is still practised today while referring to the region.

=== Alvakheda ===
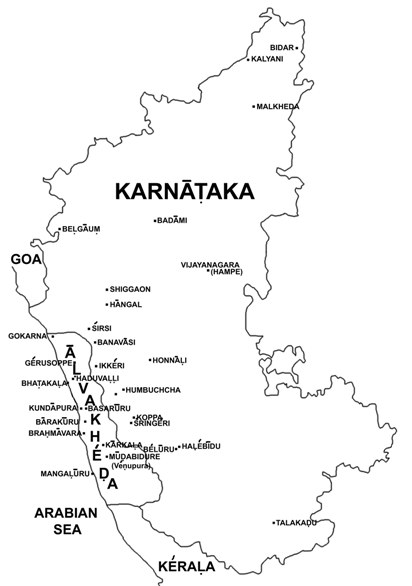

The term Alvakheda could be seen in several of ancient inscriptions of the Alupas. The region of Alvakheda encompassed the modern Tulunadu, northern and central part of Udupi district and part of Uttara Kannada up to Ankola on the coastal north and Banavasi on the interior west of Uttara Kannada District. Also, the region of Humcha in the Shimoga district, and the land of Kasaragod in present-day Kerala up to the Payasvini river was the boundary in the south. The term Alvakheda is not seen in the inscriptions during the Vijayanagara period, when the region of Barakuru and Mangalore were two separate provinces under the administration of Governors who started controlling the territory without interfering in the autonomy of the Alupas.

=== Tulunadu ===
The region stretches from Mangalore in the south all the way to swarna river in the north. On the west is the Arabian sea and on the east is the Western Ghats that fences the land like a fort that formed a heaven for the ruler. More than it, number of rivers that crisscrossed near Mangalore, Udyavara made this land fertile. The western ghats, the thick forests and the towns along the shoreline of Arabian sea established several sea ports for trade with the Romans and Arabs. Trade routes from with the Romans were well established as early as the 2nd century CE and with the Arabs around 7th century CE. The Netravati in Mangalore and Seethanadi in Barkur are the main rivers that run in the capital cities of Alupas. Other rivers such as Suvarnanadi, Shambhavi in Karkala and Mulki, Gurupura river, Pavanje, Nandini and numerous streams all running from east to west. The region of Puttur, Sullia, Belthangady and Puttur, Karkala are the Malnad region and supported as an agricultural backbone of the kingdom and the region of Mangalore, Udupi and Kundapur are the coastal regions that supported more of marine activities though agriculture is the other occupation.

An Old Malayalam inscription (Ramanthali inscriptions), dated to 1075 CE, mentioning king Kunda Alupa, can be found at Ezhimala (the former headquarters of Mushika dynasty) near Cannanore, Kerala.

== Epigraphs ==
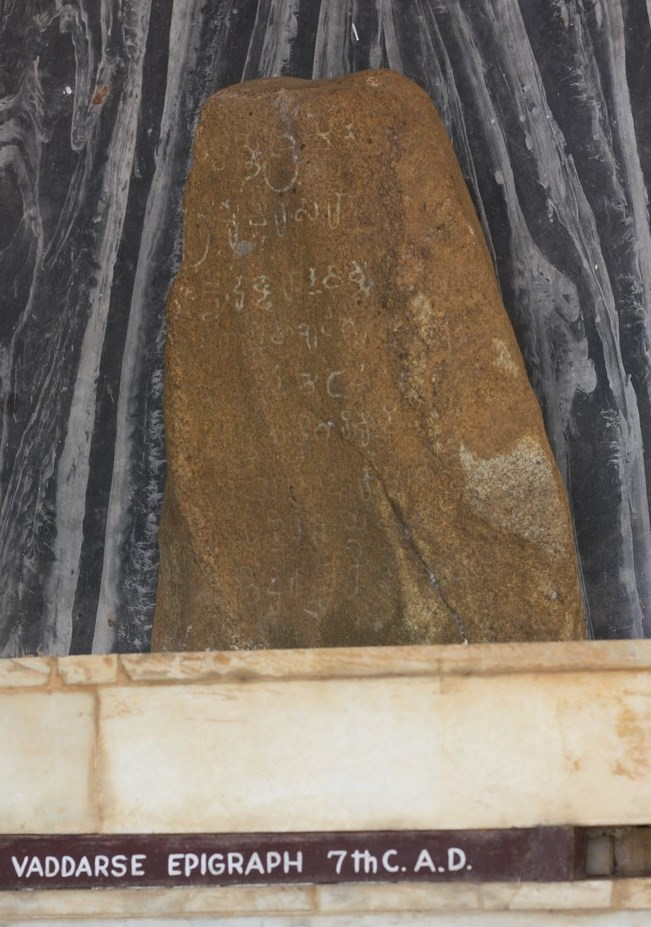
The Vaddarse Old Kannada inscription (650 AD) of King Aluvarasa I

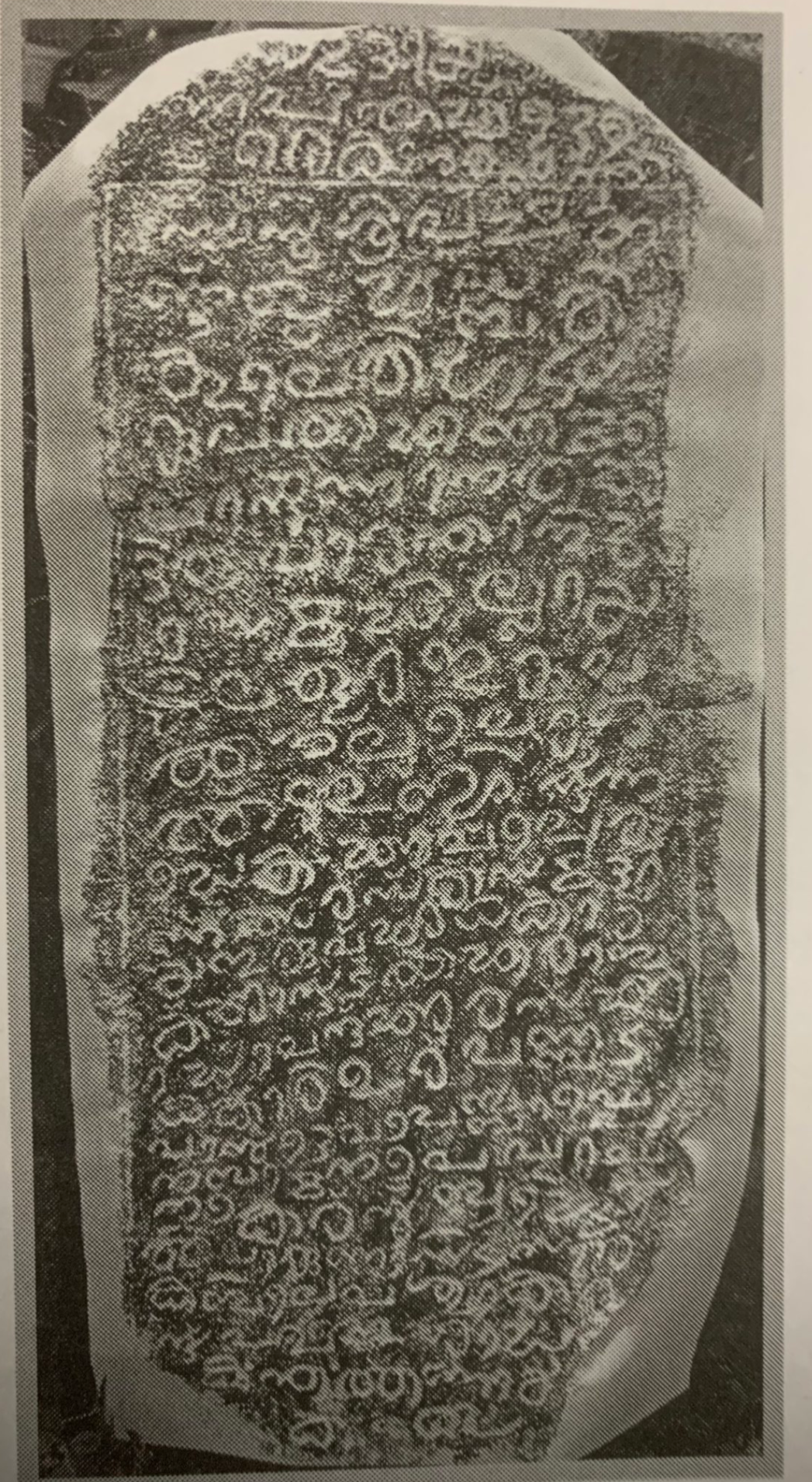
Tulu inscription Mulki

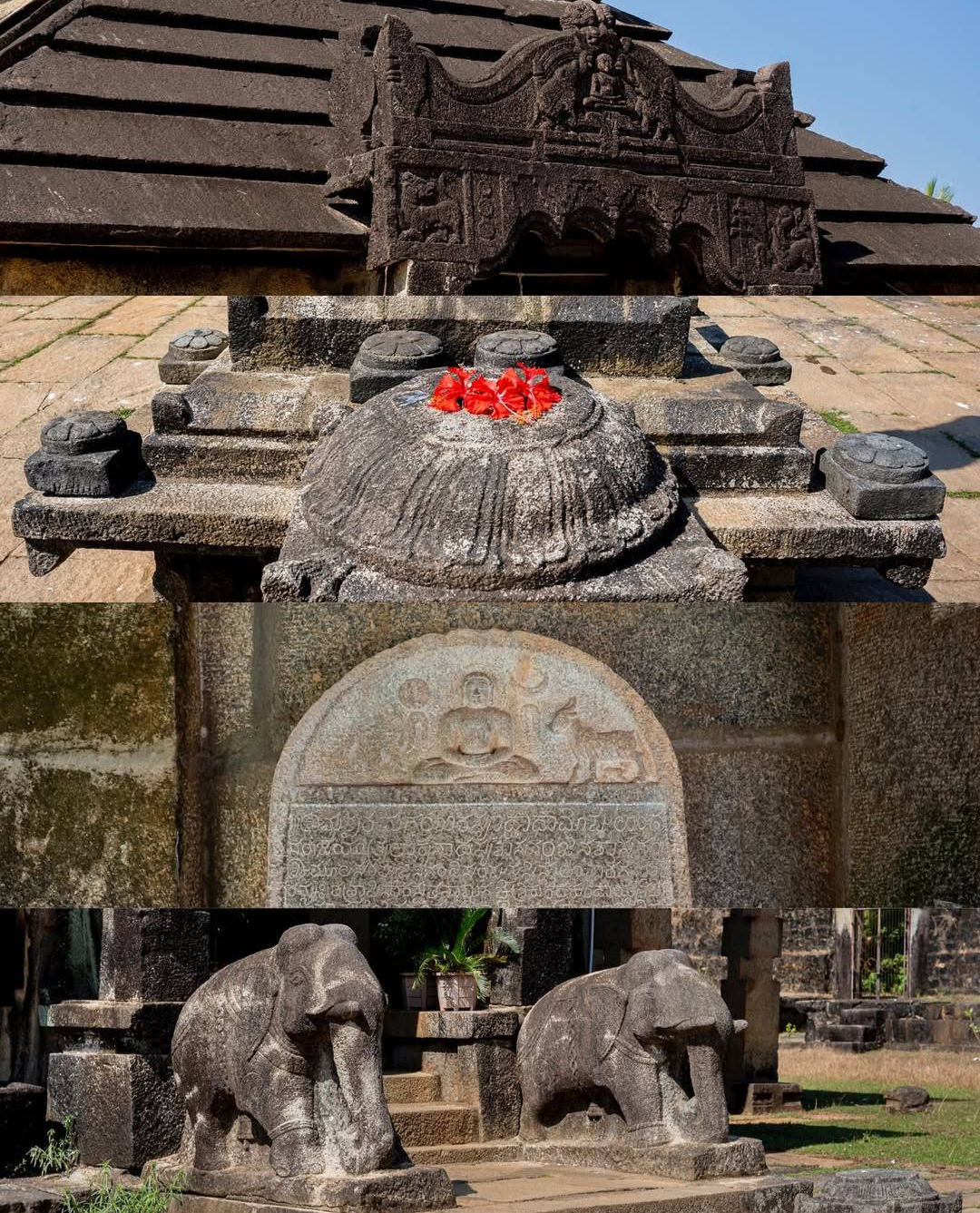
epigraphs of Alupa Dynasty, Varanga

The earliest known copper plate inscription in Kannada language is attributed to Aluvarasa II, called the Belamannu plates and is dated the early 8th century, according to Dr. Gururaj Bhat. This full-length Kannada copper plates in Old Kannada or Halegannada (Kannada: ಹಳೆಗನ್ನಡ) script (early 8th century CE) belongs to the Alupa King Aluvarasa II from Belmannu, Karkala Taluk, Udupi District, and displays the double crested fish, the royal emblem of Alupa kings. The records also refers to the king with the title Alupendra.

The first known epigraph that talks about the possession of Banavasi Mandala (Banavasi kingdom of Uttara Kannada District) by the Alupas, belongs to the reign of Western Chalukya king Vinayaditya. Te epigraph comes from Jambani of Sagar Taluk, discovered by Dr Gururaj Bhat, mentions about Chitravahana Alupendra in possession of Kadamba mandala. This is, in fact, the first stone epigraph that points the ruler as a subordinate to Western Chalukya King (8th century CE). An Old Malayalam inscription (Ramanthali inscriptions), dated to 1075 CE, mentioning king Kunda Alupa, the ruler of Alupa dynasty of Mangalore, can be found at Ezhimala (the former headquarters of Mushika dynasty) near Cannanore, in the North Malabar region of Kerala. It is one of the oldest inscriptions available about Alupa dynasty.

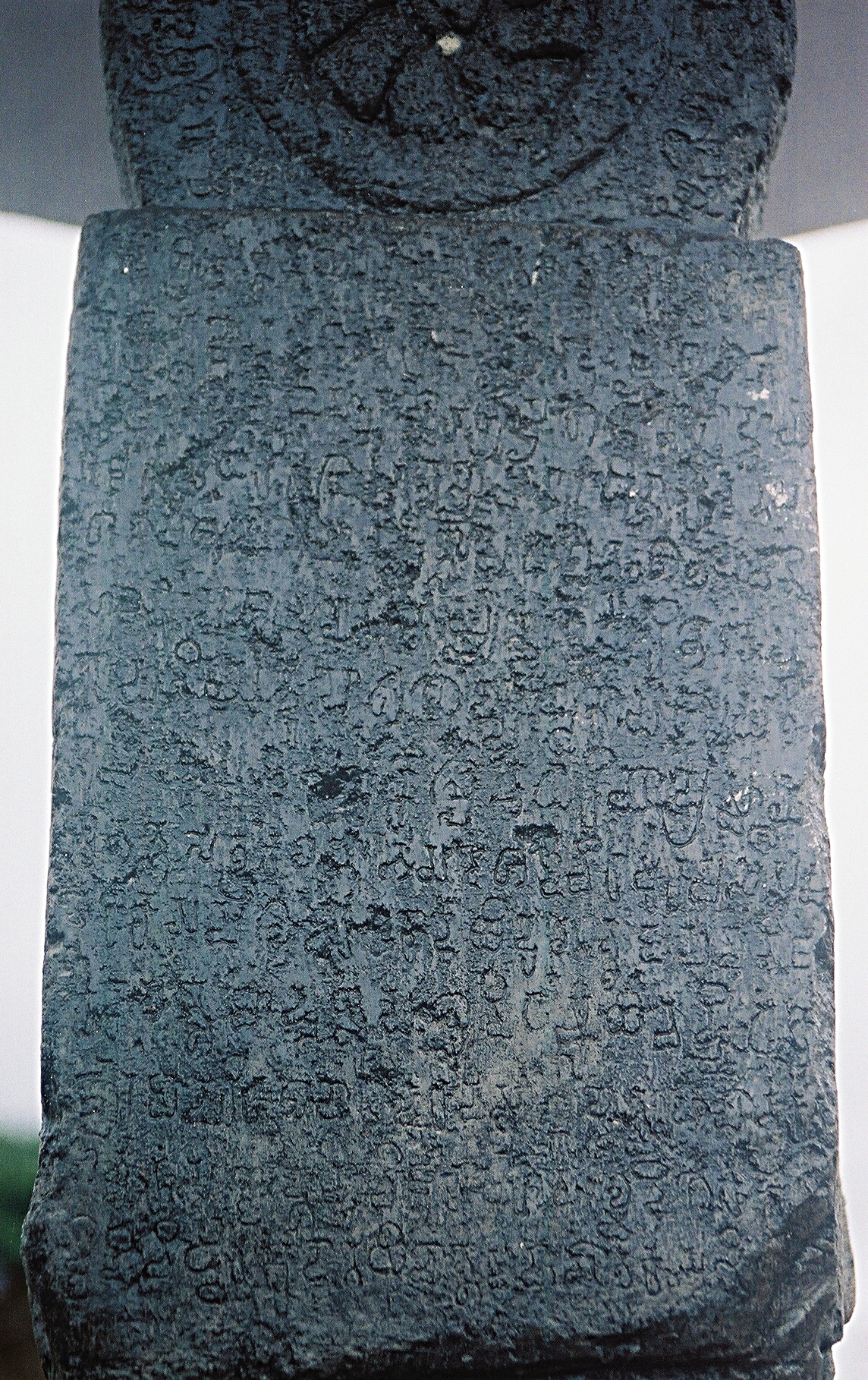
A replica of the Halmidi inscription (450 C.E) which mentions Pashupathi, the earliest known Alupa king by name.

The inscription at Talangere Kasaragod sheds light on the Alupa ruler Jayasimha and his sister Mochabbarasi.

The oldest Tulu inscription discovered to date in the region is located at Pelattur, the one from the Kulashekhara temple in Mangaluru dated to 1159 A.D. Discovered by Prof.A. Murugeshi, it provides valuable information about the Alupa dynasty and is significant for the study of the Tulu language and culture. The inscription showcases the use of pure Tulu words and demonstrates the existence and sophistication of the Tulu language and script in ancient times.

== List of rulers ==
The medieval and later Alupa used the imperial titles of Pandya-Maharajadhiraja, Paramabhattaraka and Pandya-Chakravarti. The two reigning queens, Ballamahadevi and Chikkayi-Tayi, were also titled Pandya-Chakravarti.

Ruler's name	Year of reign	Relation
Pashupathi	450 CE	
To be known	500 – 7th century CE	
Aluvarasa I	Early 7th century	Father-in-law of Pulakeshin II
Gunasagara	660–630 CE	
Chitravahana	663–730 CE	Husband of Chalukya princess Kumkuma Mahadevi and brother-in-law of Chalukya Vijayaditya
Aluvarasa II		Incurred the wrath of the Chalukyas
Chitravahana II		
Ranasagara		
Pritvisagara		
Marama		
Vimaladitya		
Alva Rananjaya		
Dattalupa		
Kundavarma	960–980 CE	
Jayasimha	980–1010 CE	
Bankideva Alupendra		
Pattiyodeya		
Pandya Pattiyodeya	1080–1110 CE	
Kavi Alupendra CE		
Pattiyodeya Kulashekara Alupendra	1160–1220 CE	
Kundana	1220–1230 CE	
Vallabhadeva Duttalupa		
Virapandya	1250–1275 CE	
Queen Ballamahadevi	1275–1292 CE	Co-ruler of her son Nagadevarasa
Nagadevarasa		
Bankideva II		
Soyideva		
Queen Chikkayi-Tayi	1333–1348 CE	Co-ruler of her son Kulashekara and vassal of her husband the Hoysala king Veera Ballala III
Kulashekara II	1335–1346 CE	Son and co-ruler of the Alupa princess Chikkayi-Tayi
Bankideva III		
Kulashekara III	1355–1390 CE	
Virapandya II		

== Art and architecture ==
The Alupas built some fine temples in their area of rule. The Panchalingeshwara temple at Barkur, Brahmalingeshwara temple at Brahamavar, Koteshwara temple at Kotinatha and the Sadashiva temple at Suratkal are attributed to them. They used sculptural styles from their various overlords over the centuries.

1 The Kattale Basadi, Barkur

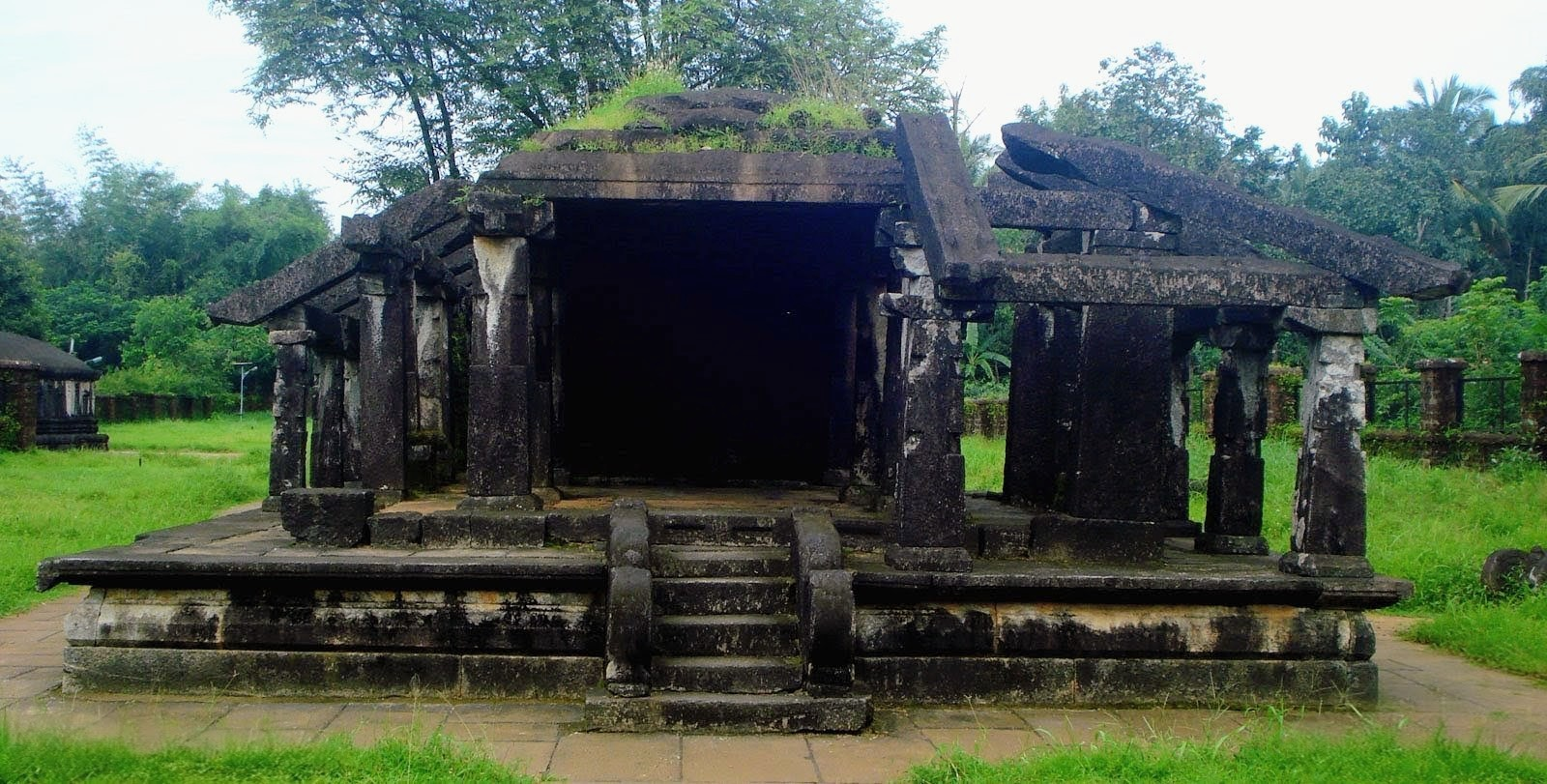
Kattale Jain basadi, commissioned by Alupa dynasty

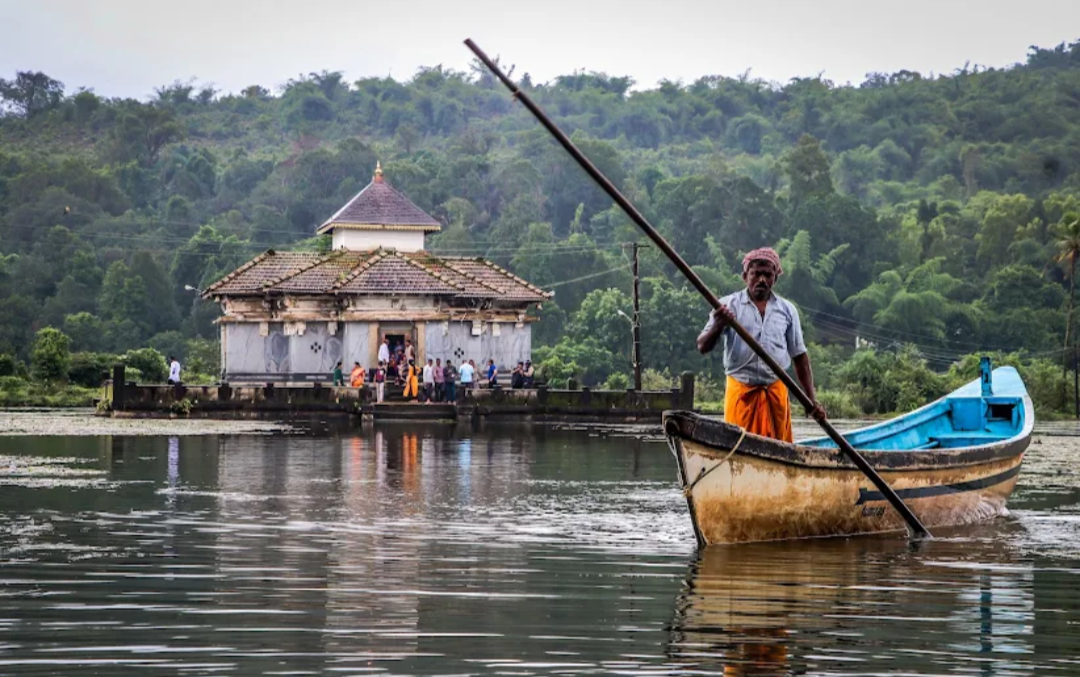
Varanga Jain Temple commissioned by Alupa dynasty Queen Jakala Devi between (2-15th century)

The temple is traditionally attributed to the Alupa dynasty and later received patronage during the Vijayanagara Empire. The temple complex is believed to have originally housed 24 Tirthankara idols, of which only one survives today. Barkur served as an important Jain center under the Alupas and later dynasties, with several basadis (Jain temples) constructed in the region.

2. Sri Rajarajeshwari Temple, Polali

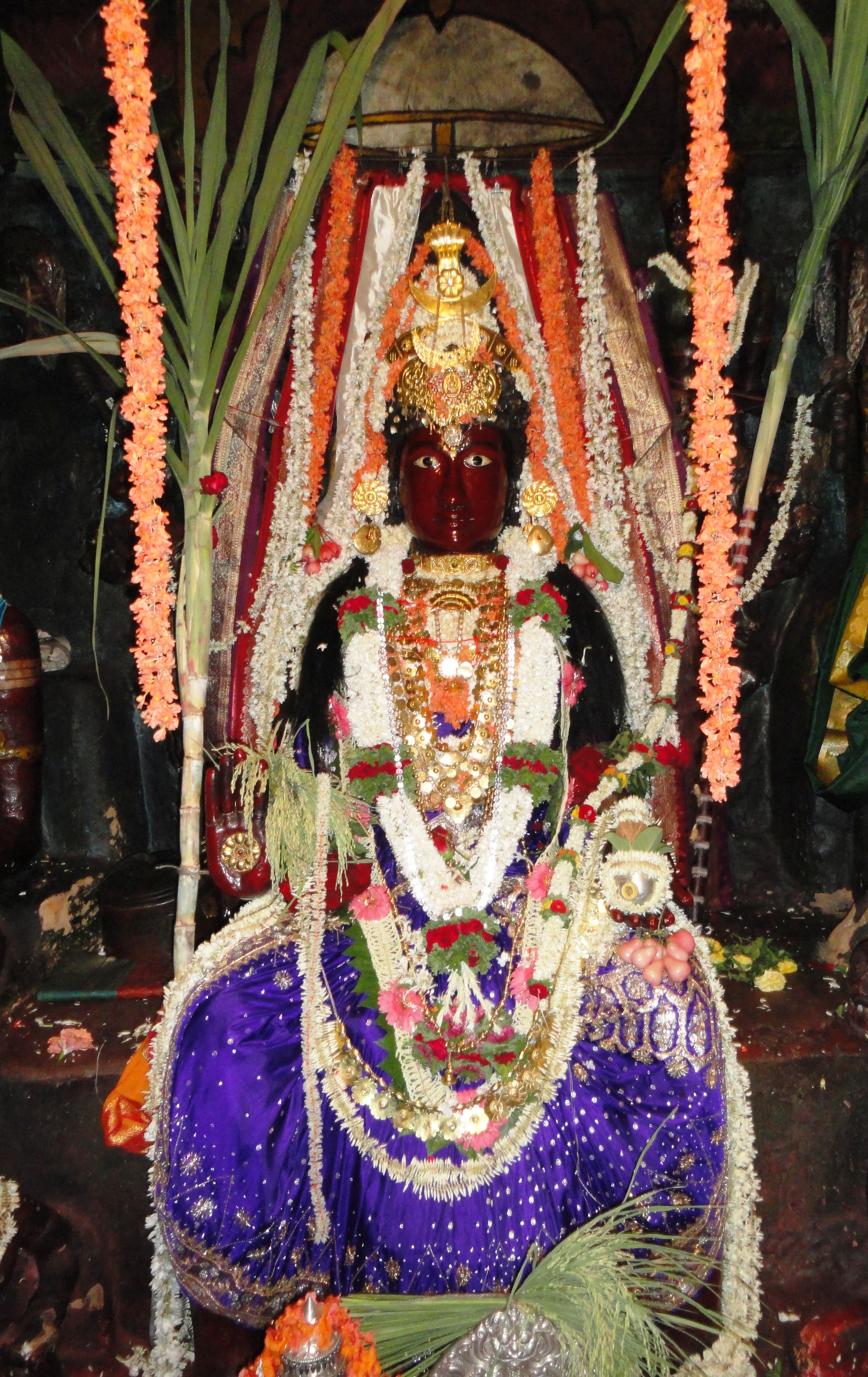
Murti of the Goddess Rajarajeshwari at the temple patronized by the Alupas

In modern Mangalore District, Polali Rajarajeshwari Temple is one of the oldest temple that has the earliest inscription of the Alupa dynasty, written in 8th century Kannada. The temple is dedicated to Sri Rajarashewari, and Alupa kings enriched this temple during throughout their rule.

3. Sri Manjunatheshwara Temple, Kadri

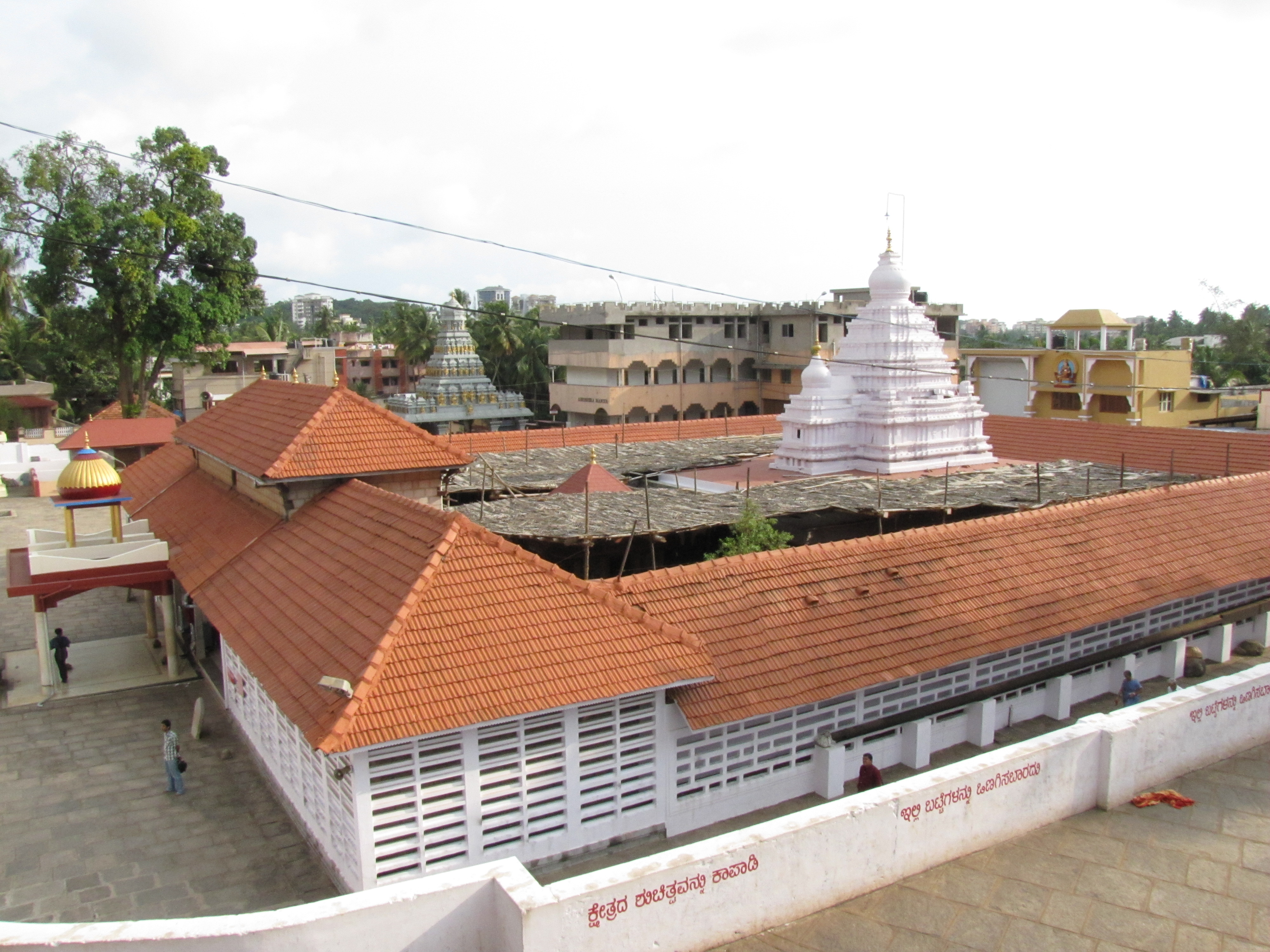
The Kadri Manjunath temple was built and patronized by the Alupas

In modern Mangalore district, Kadri has the other important and old temple that belonged to the era of Alupas. The temple has several finest bronze statues installed by the King Kundavarma, which bears inscriptions of him dated 968 CE. In the inscription of Lokeshwara statue, king Kundavarma is compared to Arjuna in bravery.

4. Sri Mahishamardini Temple, Neelavara
In times, Alupas changed their capital from Mangalore to Udyavara, Udyavara to Mangalore and then again to Barkur depending on the political situation and demand. To be in centre to their ruling place, they even shifted their capital to Barakur from where they could look after the vast territory which spread up to Ankola in the North Kanara (Uttara Kannada District). During this period, they patronised several temples in the surrounding areas of Barakuru (which was their capital). Neelavara Kshetra is one such a holy place where Mahishasuramardini temple has several Alupa inscriptions of later period.

5. Sri Panchalingeshwara Temple, Vittla
This temple is one of the oldest temple of Alupa territory, built during 7th century CE. The architecture of the temple is in line with that of Sri Ananteshwara temple which is the oldest temple built by the Alupas. The architecture is unique and is an innovation of 7th century. The Havyaka Brahmins of Uttara Kannada were attracted during 7th century CE by the Alupas and were given Agraharas in Alvakheda. The Alupas thought a Jain built many Hindu temples and allowed these Brahmins to take care of it. The legend says that there were hundreds of temples that every day there is a festival in one or other temple of the region. The temple of Vittla Panchalingeshwara is one of the oldest structure which was renovated by the later local dynasties such as Heggades.

6. Sri Anantheshwara Temple, Udupi
Diagonally opposite to the main entrance of the Sri Krishna Mutt, and adjacent to the Chandramouleeshwara Temple, stands one of the oldest Alupa temple namely Sri Anantheswara Temple. An old belief is that lighting a lamp at the ancient Anantheshwara Temple takes away evil and sins. It is one of the biggest temple in Udupi. The main idol is Linga, whose adornment makes it to look like a Face of Lord Siva. From a small window on the left, the site where Madhvacharya disappeared is seen.

Both Sri Vittla Panchalingeshwara and Sri Udupi Anantheshwara Temple have Elephant-back type curvilinear structure. Another temple of similar architecture is also seen in Aihole Durga temple, appears to be a structure of 7th century CE. So, tagging it to any architectural style is ruled out unless more detailed study or research is done on this topic. The unique noteworthy feature of the architecture of South Canara temples is their roof. Being in a landscape of high rainfall, the temple roofs evolved from grass, clay tiles and eventually with the copper-plates.
