= Mushika dynasty =

Ruling lineage from ancient/early medieval south India

Mushika Ezhimala (early historic) Mushika/Kolla-desham (medieval)
- Capital: Ezhimala (Kannur) (early historic); Kollam/Kolam (early medieval); Karippattu, Taliparamba (c. 12th century)
- Common languages: Tamil (early historic); Malayalam (medieval)
- Religion: Hinduism
- Government: Chieftaincy (early historic); Monarchy (early medieval)
- Today part of: India

Mushika dynasty, also spelled Mushaka, also Eli or Ezhi, was a minor dynastic power that held sway over the region in and around Mount Ezhi (Ezhimala, in present-day Kannur district), northern Kerala, south India, from the early historic period up to the medieval period.

The country of the Ezhimala, ruled by an ancient chiefly lineage ("the Muvan"), appears in early historic (pre-Pallava) south India. Early Tamil poems (the Sangam Literature) contain several references to the exploits of Nannan, the ruler of Ezhimala (fl. c. 180 AD) who famously defeated the Tagadur Satiyaputra ruler. Nannan was known as a great enemy of the early Chera rulers of western Tamil Nadu and central Kerala. The famous Kottayam Coin Hoard, a massive cache of mostly Julio-Claudian (Roman) coins, was also discovered from the Ezhimala country.

The Ezhimala polity evolved into a monarchical state (known as "Kolla-desham") in the early medieval period and soon came under the influence of the neighboring Chera kingdom. The Ezhimala or Mushika rulers are recorded to have supported the Cheras in their conflicts with the Chola Empire. Chola records mention the defeat of Kollam and the fall of its ruler, while another inscription confirms the presence of Chola soldiery in north Kerala in the early 11th century. After the decline of the Chera state, the kingdom endured as "Kolathunad" in the Kannur-Kasaragod region. The Mushaka Vamsa Kavya, a dynastic chronicle composed in the 11th century by poet Athula, describes the history of the Mushika lineage.

The economies of the early historic Ezhimala polity and the medieval Mushika state are thought to have depended largely on the Indian Ocean spice trade — particularly in pepper, cardamom, and other hill produce — while conventional agriculture (wet-rice cultivation) played a lesser role.

== Etymology ==
The term "Mushika" or "Mushaka" Parvata is the Sanskrit translation of the ancient Tamil name "Ezhimalai" (or the Ezhil Kunram). It was later mispronounced as "Elimala", which came to mean "the Mountain of the Rats". The term "Mushika" also referred to the "Vaka" tree (Albizia lebbeck or Acacia sirissa), which was considered sacred by the rulers of Ezhimala.

Ezhimala hill (or the Ezhil Kunram) is described in Mushaka Vamsa Kavya as "Mushaka Parvata". The early historic fort of the Mushikas, located beneath Ettikulam Fort, is now protected by Department of Archaeology, Kerala.

== Early historic Ezhimala rulers ==
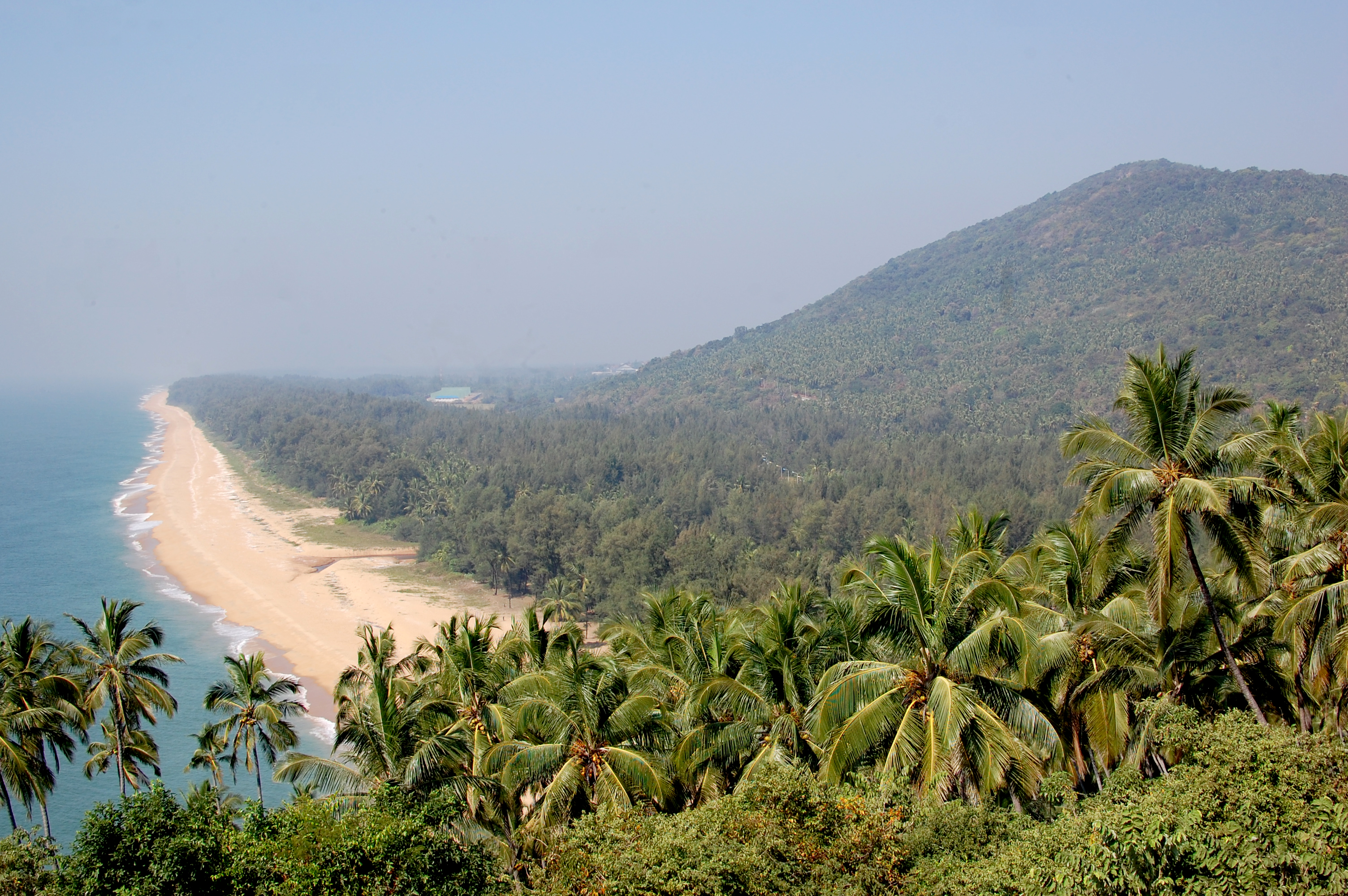
Ezhimala Hill

The ancient ruling family of Ezhimala appears to have existed in northern Kerala at least from the early historic (pre-Pallava) period. Ancient Tamil poems (the Sangam Literature) describe the polity of Ezhimalai (also "Ezhil-malai"), situated on the northern edge of Tamilakam (the Tamil country) on its western (Malabar) coast.

The rulers of Ezhimalai were among the most prominent hill chieftains of ancient Kerala. The "Muvan" chieftain mentioned in early Tamil poems — described as an adversary of the early Chera rulers of western Tamil Nadu and central Kerala — is identified with the Muvan ruler of Ezhimalai. The early historic Ezhimala clan maintained matrimonial alliances with the Chera, Pandya and, Chola families. The family was also related to that of the rulers of Kantiramala.

According to the Sangam poems, the port of "Naravu" was located within the territory of Ezhimalai (Akam, 97). The Mahabharata, the Sanskrit epic poem of ancient India, also mentions the Mushikas as one of the kingdoms of the deep south, grouping them alongside the Keralas, Pandyas, and Cholas.

=== Ezhimala Nannan ===
Akananuru - 396 poem mentioned about Nannan:

"I am holding on to you, my lord!

Please do not abandon me! When Nannan with gold ornaments and chariots with flags showed his rage to the citizens of Punnadu, Ay Eyinan protected them in Pazhi, a town with lute music in the streets, and fought well against Nannan’s astute warrior Mignili and gave up his life. You made a promise before the fierce god holding my delicate forearms, but you have gone past those words. For my anxious heart to feel much better, I would like to embrace your chest. You have refused that and become a stranger to me. Now I will not let you get away! Like Kaviri river which fell in love with the pretty dancer Athi and took him away from his wife Āthimanthi who was sad and cried, your wife is trying to remove you from me. I am afraid I will lose you. Should you leave, you need to return my beauty, lovely like Vanji city of the victorious Cheran king who attacked with rage the trembling Aryans, captured their king and carved the Chera bow

symbol on the ancient, northern mountains."

— Akananuru - 396

Early Tamil tradition (the Sangam poems) contains repeated references to several rulers of Ezhimala ("the Ezhil Kunram") bearing the name or title "Nannan". These are attested in collections such as the Akananuru, Purananuru, Natrinai, Pathitruppathu, and Kurunthokai. According to these poems, Nannan was the ruler of Ezhimalai ("the Ezhil Kunram"), situated on the north-western edge of the Tamil country. He is also notably described as a hunter chieftain of the "vetar" descent group ("vetar-ko-man") and is portrayed as a formidable adversary of the early (pre-Pallava) Chera rulers. The Vaka tree is mentioned as the sacred tutelary tree of Ezhimala Nannan.

Nannan is perhaps to be identified with "Nandana", the ancient Ezhimala ruler referred to in the medieval poem Mushaka Vamsa.

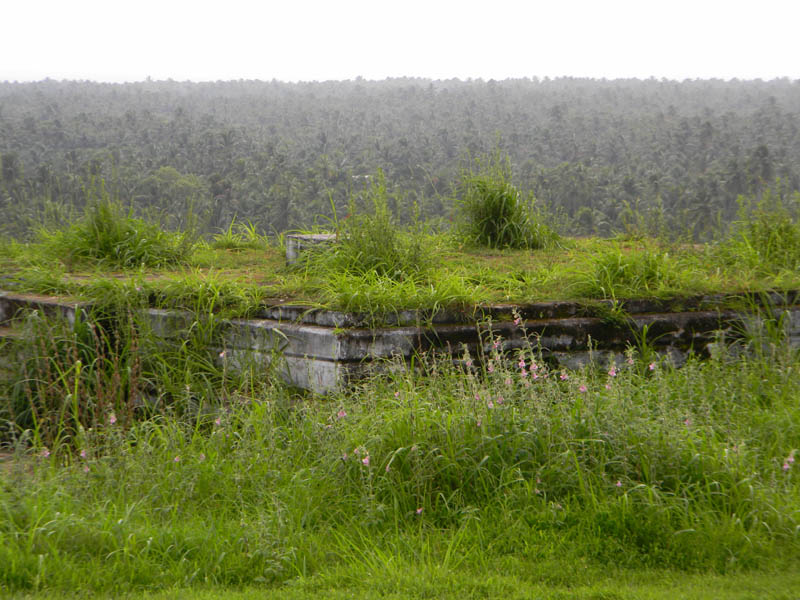
Madayi Fort remains

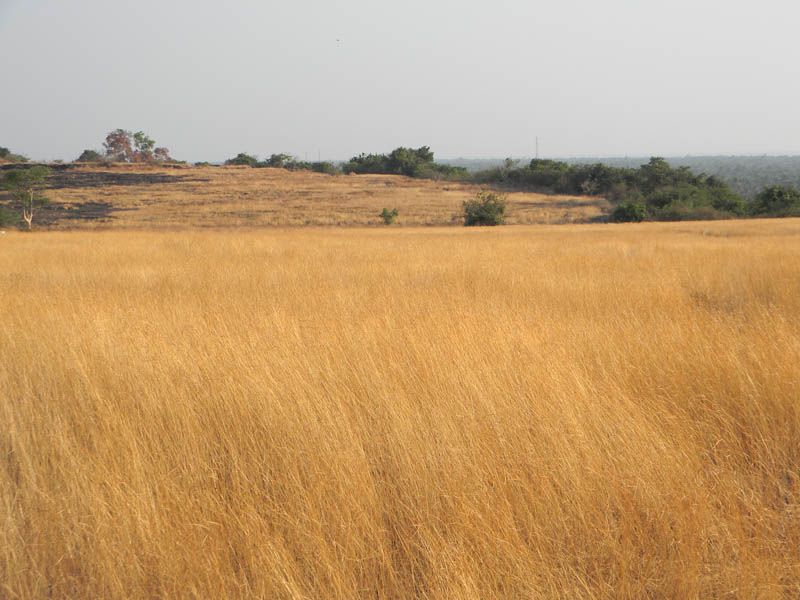
Madayi Para

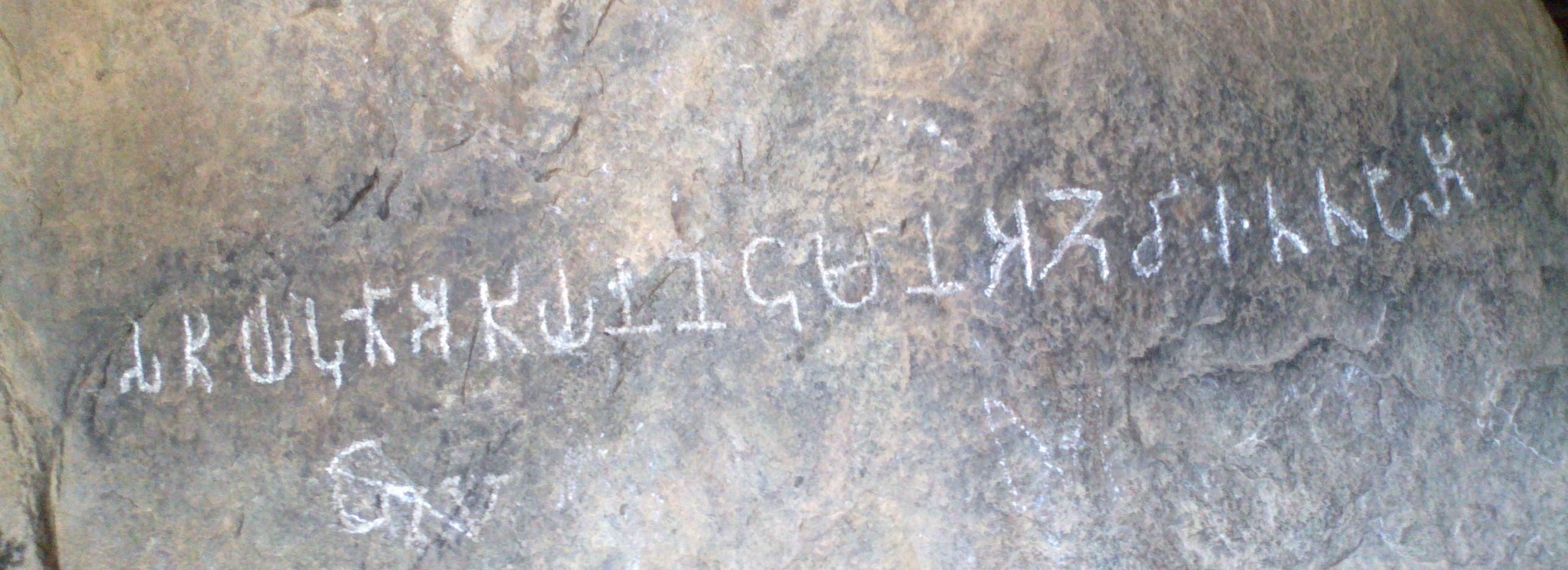
Inscription of Tagadur Adigan or Adigaiman ruler (the Satiyaputra) Neduman Anji

- Nannan (fl. c. 180 AD) is described as the ruler of "Pazhi, near the Ezhil Hill" and "Param" by poet Paranar (Akam, 142 and 152). He is also reported as the master of the Ezhil Hill and Puzhinadu country, and certain "Viyalur". It is attested that Nannan was renowned for his gold ornaments and gilded chariots.
- There are additional references to certain "Nannan" as the ruler of the Punnadu country, Tulunadu country and the Konkanam region and the Thondai Mandalam (the later in "Malaipadukkadam").
- Nannan was a companion of the Ay ruler (south Kerala) Eyinan. Poems 351 and 396 of the Purananuru describe Nannan and Eyinan as relatives and as extremely close friends. Their relationship was so intimate that Nannan renamed the "Pirampu hills" in his country as "Ay-pirampu".
- In the battle of Pazhi, the warriors of Nannan, led by certain Njimili (or Minjili; "the master of Param"), defeated the Thagadur Adigan or Adigaiman ruler (the Satiyaputra) Neduman Anji. Acting on behalf of the Chera ruler Perum Cheral Irumporai, the Adigaiman had invaded Nannan's territory at Pazhi with a large force. During the battle, the Adigaiman was slain by Njimili (or Minjili) ("who won fame by putting to the sword vast numbers of enemies"). Njimili also killed Ay Eyinan, the old companion of Nannan, but was himself slain in the same conflict ("the battle of Pazhi Paranthalai", Akam, 141, 181, and 396, and Natrinai, 265).
- It is also mentioned that in a battle at Kazhumalam, Nannan defeated a chieftain named Pindan (Akam, 152, and Natrinai, 270). The poet Kudavayur Kirattanar records Nannan's defeat of a certain Pazhayan, with the support of his associates Ettai, Atti, Gangan, Katti, and Punthurai (Akam, 44).
- It is further recorded that the "Kosar" people, associated with Chellur (Perinchellur or Taliparamba), attacked the Ezhimala country of Nannan, defeating him and even cutting down his totemic mango tree. According to the poems, Nannan had earlier executed a young girl who had unknowingly eaten a fruit that had fallen from his sacred mango tree and floated down to her in a stream. This act is said to have provoked the Kosar, leading to their attack and Nannan's defeat.
- Nannan was ultimately defeated and killed by Chera ruler "Kalankaykkanni" Narmudi Cheral (fl. c. 180 AD) in the battle of "Kadambin Peruvayil"/"Vakai Perunthurai" (Akam, 152, 199, Pathitruppathu, 40 and 4th decad, panegyric). According to Pathitruppathu 40, after slaying Nannan, the Chera ruler also chopped down the sacred Vaka tree.

Nannan (c. 210 AD), probably the son of the ruler mentioned earlier, is also introduced in the early Tamil poems. He is celebrated in "Malaipadukkadam" by the poet Perum Kausika and is also mentioned by Mankudi Marudan in "Maduraikkanchi". Another "Nannan" with the title "Udiyan" ("Nannan Udiyan"; Akam, 258: 1) is described as the "master of gold filled Pazhi".

There references to another "Nannan", the ruler of "Konkanam". He is described as the Nannan dwelling in "Kanam" and as "Konkanam Kizhan" (the lord of Konkanam), and as the lord of the mountain Konkanam ("Ko Perunkanam") (Akam, 392).

== Economy ==
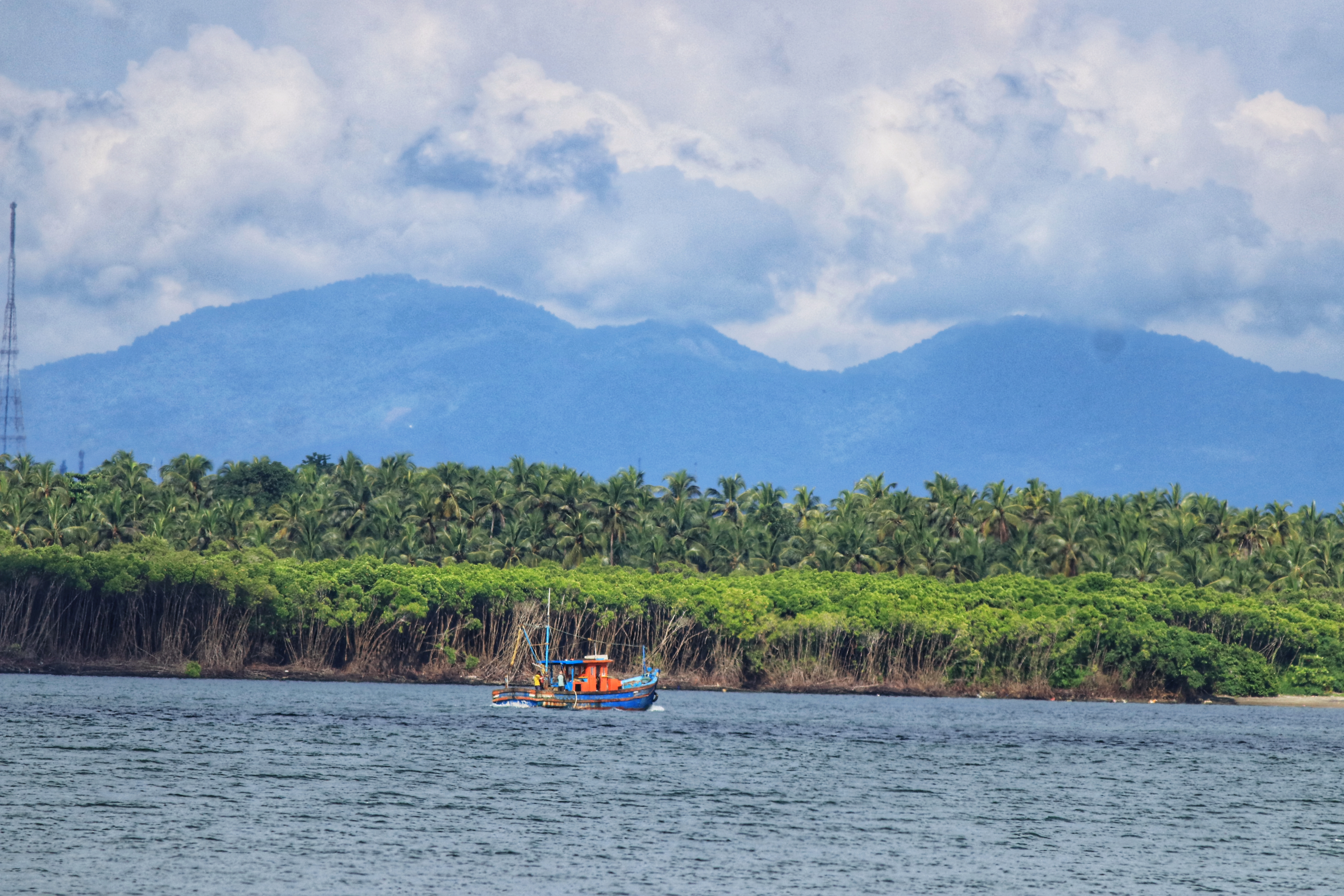
Ezhimala on the Malabar Coast

India Route

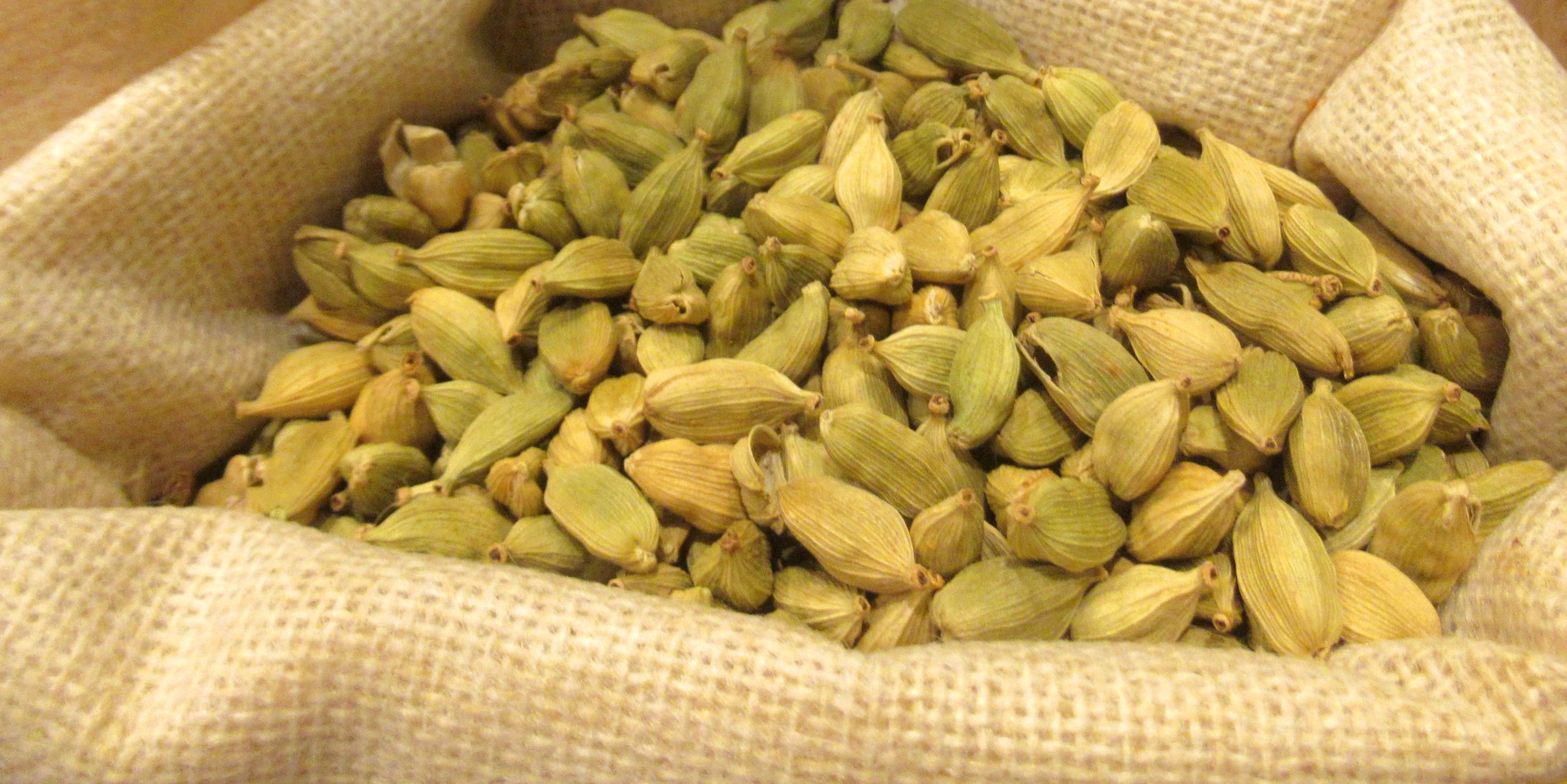
Cardamom

The primary resource base for the Ezhimala polity (in the early historic period) and the Mushika state (medieval) was Indian Ocean spice trade (esp. pepper, cardamom and other spices from the interior hills) rather than agriculture (wet paddy cultivation). Ezhimala Hill was notably the first landfall on the Malabar Coast for the sailors crossing the Arabian Sea.

=== Greco-Roman spice trade ===
Much like the rest of Malabar Coast, the Ezhimala country and its ancient rulers benefited from Greco-Roman Indian Ocean spice trade during the early historic period. Early Tamil literature mentions an Indian Ocean port known as "Naravu", located in Ezhimalai country (Akam, 97). The term "naravu" means "honey" or "liquor" in early Tamil dialects.

Naravu is generally identified with Naura, which is mentioned in the Periplus of the Erythraean Sea, an early Greek manual of sailing directions written in the 1st century AD, as a port located somewhere north of Tyndis and Muziris (central Kerala) on the present-day Malabar Coast. According to both Periplus of the Erythraean Sea and Pliny the Elder (1st century AD), Naura was located on western coast of the Tamil-speaking south India (Limyrike/Limerike or Damirica/Damirike), but outside the influence of the Chera rulers of central Kerala/western Tamil Nadu.

Naura is commonly identified with present-day Kannur (Cannanore), located south of the Ezhimala Hill. However, historians have proposed different identifications for the ancient port. K. D. Thirunavukkarasu (1994) locates it in the Tulu Country, while some scholars identify it with Honnavar (Uttara Kannada). Wilfred H. Schoff (1912) places Naura at Kannur (Cannanore), and Lionel Casson (1989) associates it with Mangalore, identifying it as Nitra. Sudhakar Chattopadhyaya (1980) also refers to Nitra (Nitrias), which is mentioned in Greco-Roman sources.

The famous Kottayam Coin Hoard, a massive cache of mostly Julio-Claudian (Roman) coins, was discovered around the year 1847 (1846-50) "on the slope of a hill by the [Arabian] sea" near Kannur (Cannanore). It is speculated that coins amounted to around 8000 aurei (if approximated). With few exceptions the coins were all of gold and were not worn by usage (and not deliberately slashed with a chisel). The composition (coin types and number) of the hoard is not known exactly. According to extant reports, there were at least 9 coins of emperor Augustus, 28 of Tiberius, two of Caligula, and 16 coins of Claudius and 16 coins of Nero (a total of 71 coins, the last 32 in the Travancore Collection). There were also descriptions of coins of Caracalla (initially misidentified as Antoninus Pius).

=== Medieval Indian Ocean trade ===
Famous medieval ports in the Ezhimala country included Madayi, Valapattanam and Dharmapattanam (Dharmadam).

The medieval Ezhimala rulers appear to have encouraged a variety of merchant guilds in their country. Well-known Indian guilds such as the anjuvannam, manigramam, valanchiyar and nanadeshikal are attested in the region. The Mushika kings are also described as great champions of Hindu religion and temples, while some are noted for their support of a prominent Buddhist vihara in central Kerala. The presence of Jewish merchants in the ports of the Mushika country is also suggested. A site in Madayi is still known as "the Jew's Pond" (the Jutakkulam).

== Political geography ==
=== Early historic ===
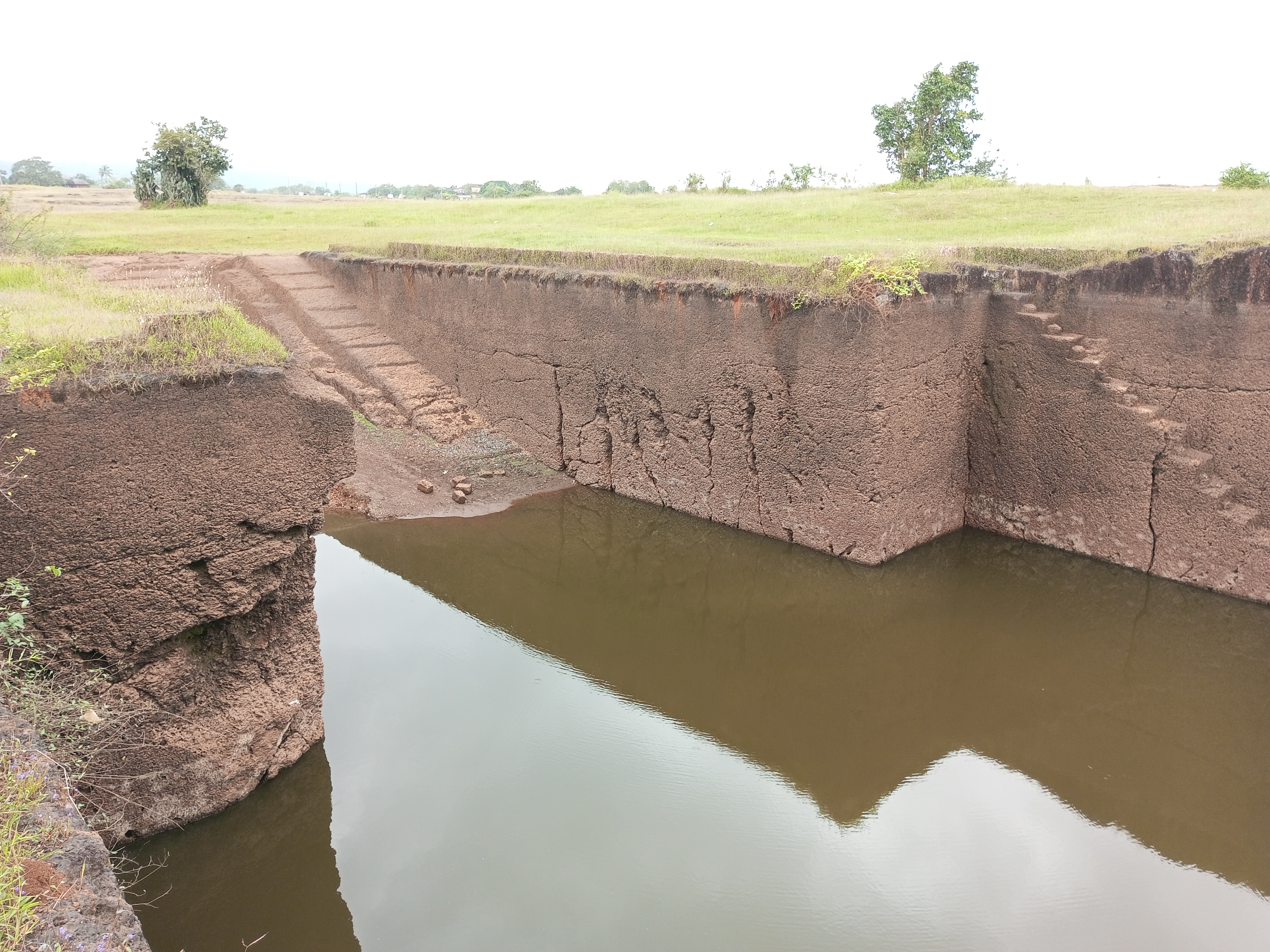
Jew's Pond (the Jutakkulam)

According to early Tamil poems (the Sangam Literature), the Ezhimala country of the early historic period was located to the north of the Chera country (central Kerala). The Ezhimala chieftain Nannan is described as the ruler of the slopes of Pazhi, the Ezhil Hill (Ezhimala), and Param, as well as settlements such as Viyalur and a land called "Punnadu". He is also referred to as the lord of "Puzhinadu" and "Tulu Nadu". Ezhimala Hill notably served as the first landmark on the Malabar Coast for Arabian Sea navigators.

There are also references to another "Nannan", the ruler of the land of "Konkanam", and yet another "Nannan" who is described as ruling in Tondai Mandalam (the later in the "Malaipadukkadam"). According to the poems, Param was formerly the base of the chieftain Minjili, who was killed in the battle of "Pazhi Paranthalai". The country of Ezhimala was also situated near the land of the "Kosar" people and the country of the "Kadambu" tribe. It is further mentioned that Nannan fought and died in a battle against the Chera ruler Narmudi Cheral at the great harbour, "Perunthurai".

The Akananuru describes the country of Nannan as follows.

[…] in the slopes of Pāḻi in the tall/long Ēḻil mountain of Naṉṉaṉ with a pearl necklace, the chief of Pāram with joy of charity/abundant toddy, who liberally gives/flings elephant bulls [due his] famous liberalism, the chief with a spear who overcame Piṇṭaṉ while breaking [his] opposition on the battlefield, [Piṇṭaṉ] who very much swarmed around showing copious enmity like a colony of small white shrimps that attacks while the good vessels which give the wealth (taṉam) of great harbour (peruntuṟai) with seashore groves at the extension of the sounding water, had been sundered/dispersed […]

=== Medieval period ===
In the medieval period, the Ezhimala region or the "Kolla-desham" was home to important ports such as Madayi, Valapattanam, and Dharmapattanam (Dharmadam). The ports of the Kollam country are thought to have hosted Jewish traders, and in Madayi, a site remembered as 'the Jew's Pond/Place' (Jutakkulam//Jutakkalam) survives as a trace of this legacy.

== Medieval Mushikas ==
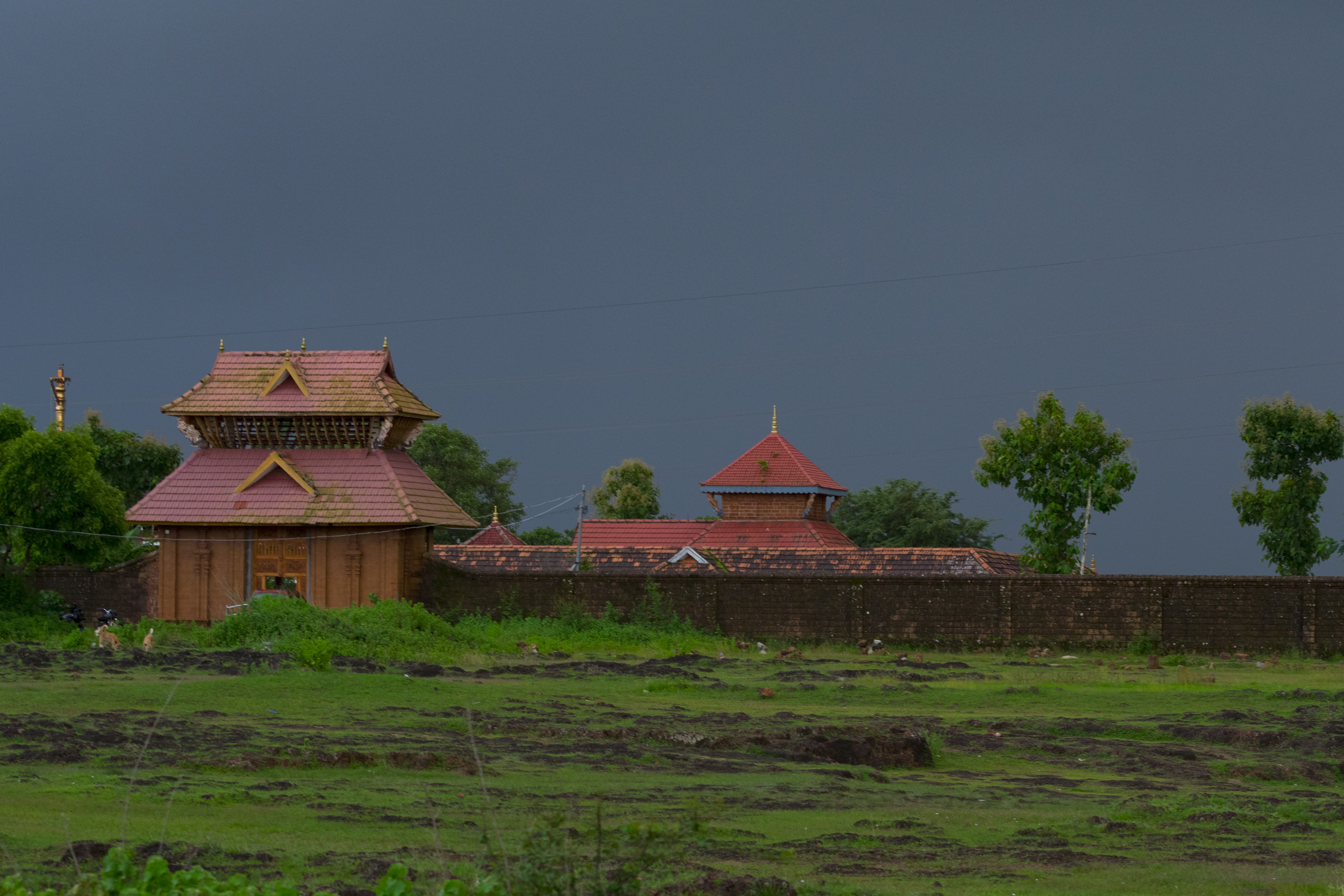
Vadukunda Temple, Madayi

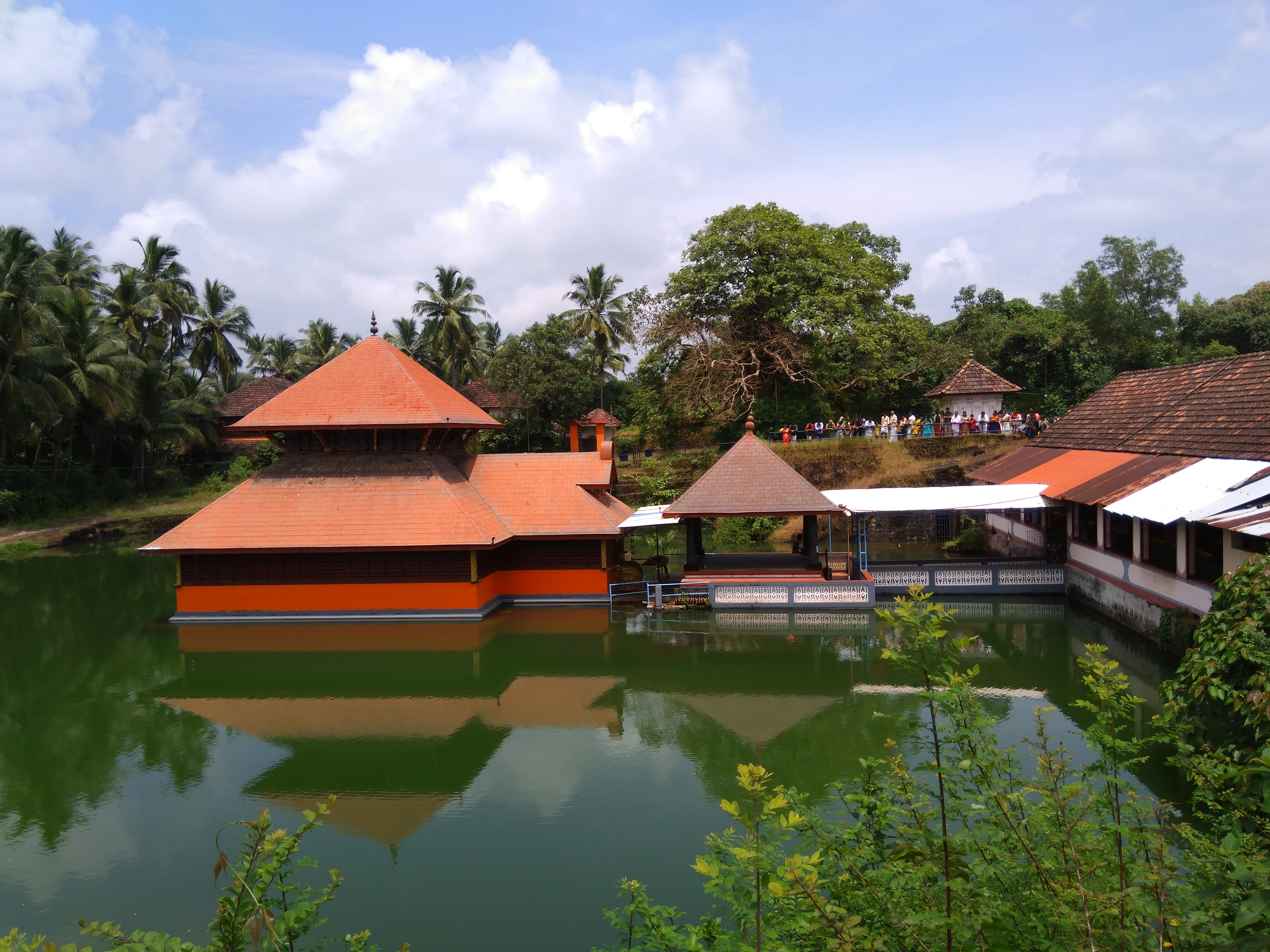
Ananthapadmanabhaswamy Temple at Ananthapura, Kumbla

The medieval "Kolla-desam" (the country of Kollam/Kolam or the "Mushika-rajya") stretched along the banks of Kavvai, Kuppam and Valappattanam rivers in northern Kerala. It came under the influence of the Chera kingdom in the early medieval period. The reign of Chera ruler Vijayaraga (late 9th century AD) probably witnessed the expansion of Chera influence into the Ezhimala country. According to literary sources, as one of the major subordinates of the Chera, the Ezhimala rulers were required to supply armed contingents for the Cheras in their battles against the imperial Cholas. However, the repeated Chola references (early 11th century AD) to three rulers in medieval Kerala — the Kolam/Ezhimala ruler, the Chera ruler and the Venad ruler — suggest that the effective power of the Chera rulers at this time was confined mainly to central Kerala. Chera authority in northern and southern Kerala appears to have been largely nominal compared with the political and military strength exercised by the Ezhimala rulers in the north and the Venad rulers in the south.

While other Kerala chieftaincies under the Chera rulers maintained local militias called "the Hundred", the Ezhimala ruler commanded his own "Companions of Honour", called "the Thousand". This privilege was generally reserved for the Chera ruler at Mahodayapuram himself. Inscriptions from the neighboring Alupa state also refer to this armed militia of "the ruler of Kolam".

=== Origins from Mushaka Vamsa Kavya ===
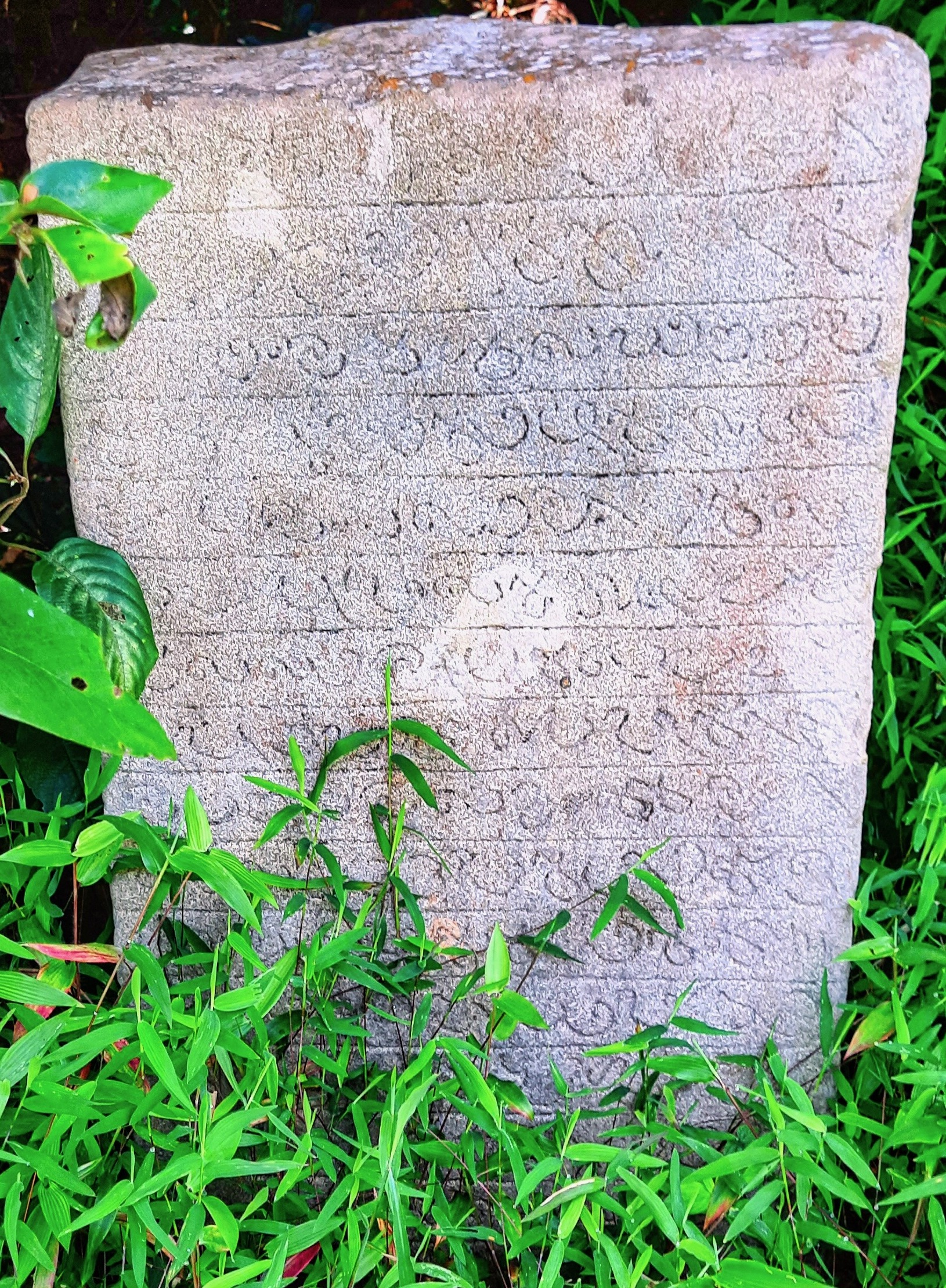
Kannapuram inscription

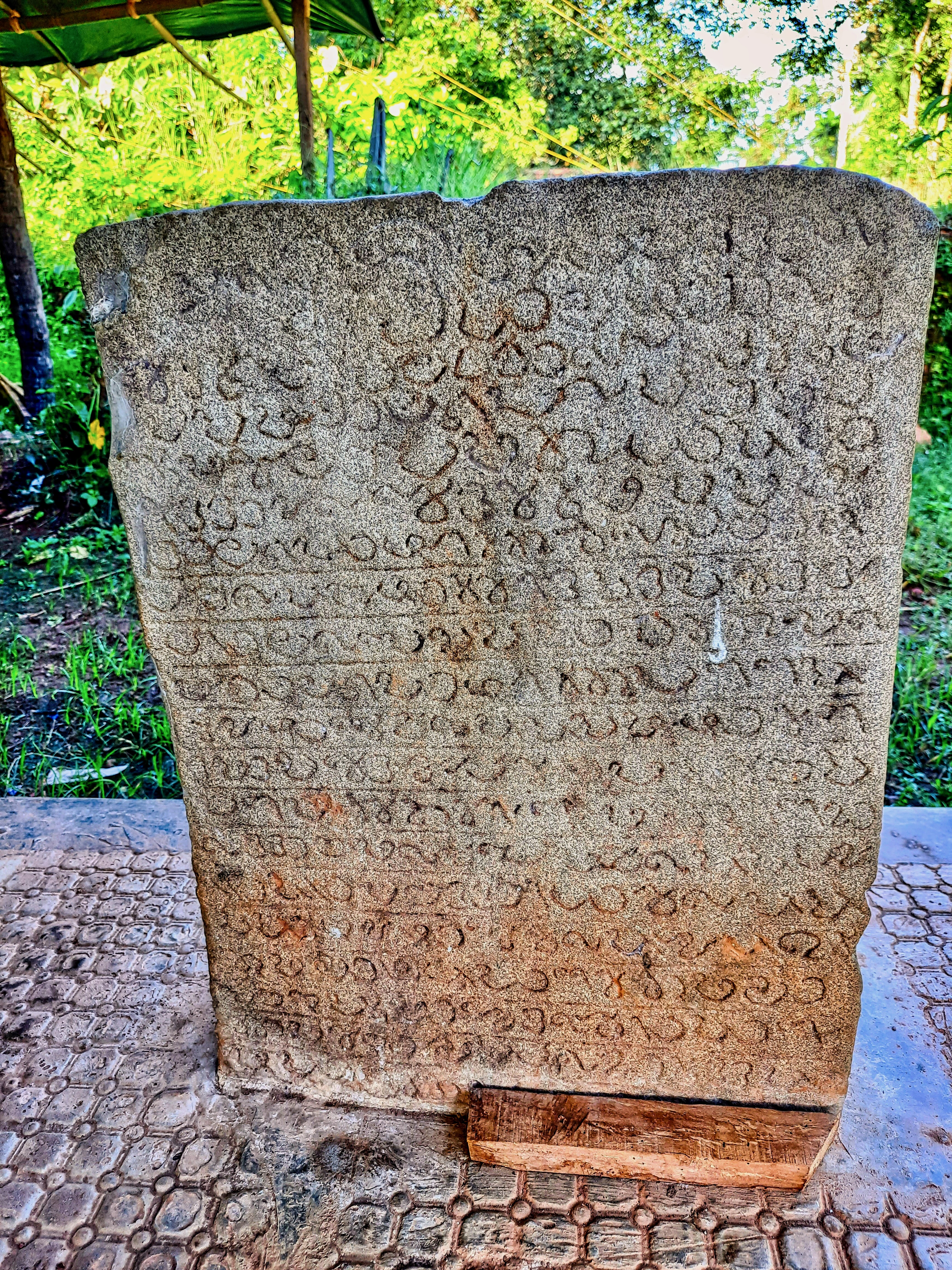
Maniyoor inscription

The Mushaka Vamsa Kavya, an 11th century dynastic chronicle composed by poet "Athula" in the court of Mushika ruler Srikantha, narrates the history of the Mushika lineage. According to the poem, the medieval Mushika rulers bore the Vaishnava garuda (eagle) banner as their flag-sign and claimed descent from the Kshatriyas of the Yadava clan. The chronicle states that the first Mushika king was consecrated by Parashurama as a Kshatriya ruler. He was the son of a widowed queen of Mahismati who had fled Parashurama's wrath and taken refuge at the divine Ezhimala Mountain. His youngest son, Nandana, succeeded him as Mushika ruler of the city of "Kolam". The first Ramaghata Mushika (the traditional title of Mushika rulers) had as his minister a "vaishya" known by the title "Maha Navika" (the Great Sailor).

The poem recounts that a Mushika ruler named Jayamani regained his throne with the aid of a Pandya, while another, Virchona, killed a Pallava royal and married his daughter. It also records that the daughter of the Mushika ruler Kunchi Varma was married to the Chera (Kerala) king "Raghupati" Jayaraga. Later, Kunchi Varma's son, Isana Varma "Ranamani", fought against the same king Jayaraga. Peace was re-established through the mediation of Goda "Keralaketu", the son of Jayaraga and the Mushika princess. Following this, king Jayaraga entered Mushika territory and visited the capital Kola, at which time Isana Varma married a Chola princess. Scholars often interpret these episodes in light of the growing Chola-Rashtrakuta rivalry in southern India. The chronicle also notes that during the reign of king Validhara, Mushika country was attacked by Ganga forces from the Mountains. Finally, the kavya states that prince Valabha, at the command of his uncle Ramaghata Jayamani, marched south to assist the Kerala (the Chera) ruler in resisting a Chola invasion of Kerala. After his coronation, Valabha is said to have extended Mushika power by conquering several islands in the ocean, identified with the Laccadives.

Mushika/Kollam Rulers from Medieval Inscriptions (10th –12th centuries AD)
Name	Title	Reign	Inscription
Validhara Vikrama Rama	N/A	fl. c. 929 AD	Ezhimala-Narayankannur inscription
Kantan Karivarman	"Ramakuta Muvar"	fl. c. 1020 AD	Eramam inscription of Chera Bhaskara Ravi
Jayamani	"Mushikesvara"	fl. c. 1020 AD	Tiruvadur inscription
-	"Ramakuta Muvar"	-	Tiruvalla Copper Plates/Huzur Treasury Plates
Udaya Varma	"Ramakuta Muvar"	Early 12th century AD	Kannapuram inscription

=== Chola attacks on Mushika kingdom (Kolla-desam) ===
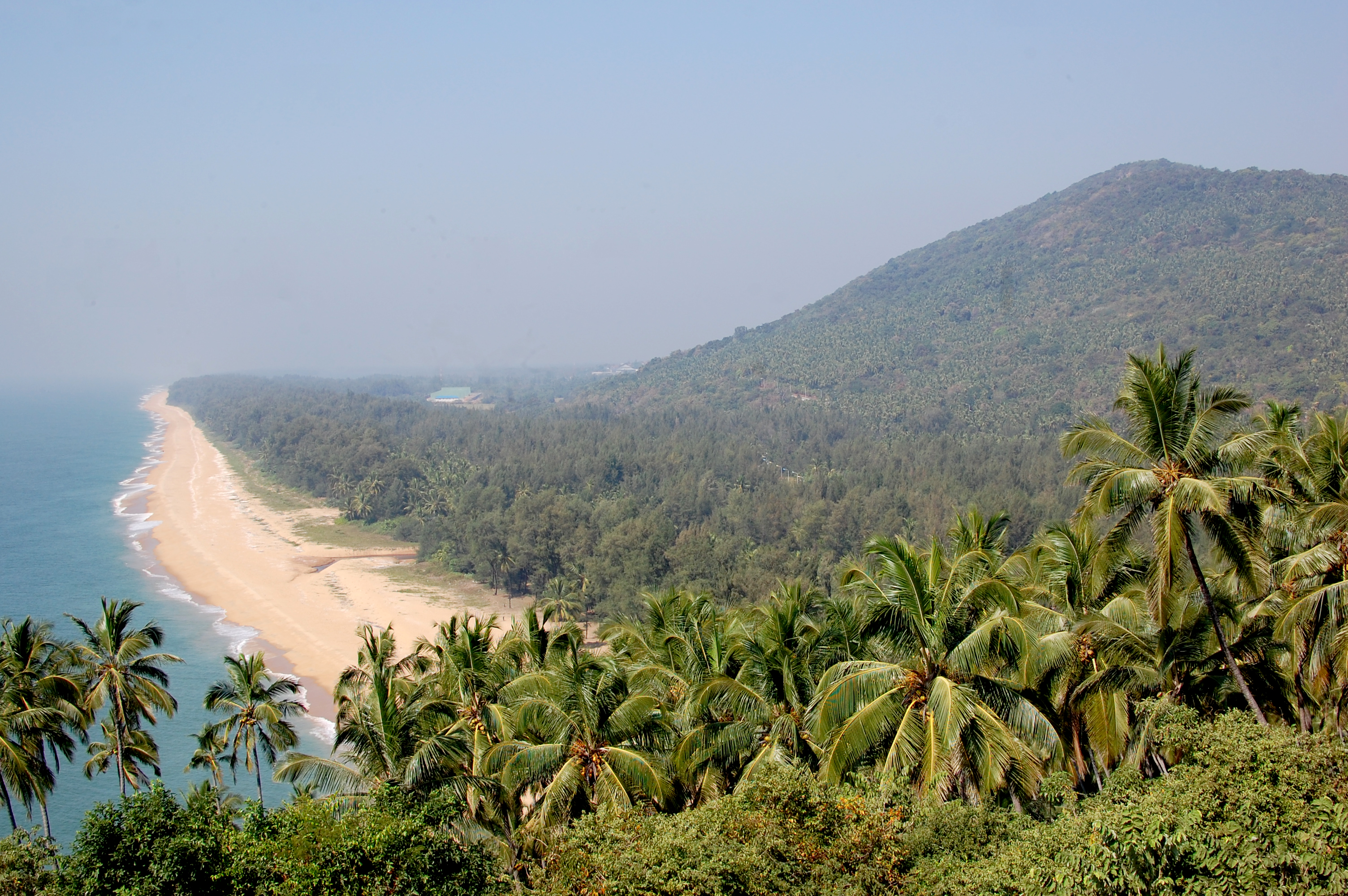
Ezhimala beach

Employs the corrections and revisions suggested by M. G. S. Narayanan to the interpretations of K. A. Nilakanta Sastri and Elamkulam P. N. Kunjan Pillai.

In 1005 AD, the 20th regnal year of the Chola emperor Rajaraja I (985–1014 AD), the Senur inscription records his defeat of the "haughty" kings of Kollam (in southern Kerala), Kolladesam, and Kodungallur (the Chera ruler). The term "Kolladesam" (the country of Kollam) is generally identified with the Ezhimala kingdom in northern Kerala. Scholars note that the inscription emphasises plunder rather than conquest, suggesting that the Chola victories at these Kerala ports were achieved primarily through naval operations. A little later, Rajaraja's successor, Rajadhiraja (1018/19–1053/54 AD), claimed to have "confined the undaunted king of Venad [back] to Che[ra]nadu, destroyed the Iramakuta Muvar in anger, and put on a fresh garland of Vanchi flowers after capturing Kantalur Salai, while the strong Villavan (the Chera king) hid himself in terror inside the jungle". The "Ramakuta Muvar", or the Mushika ruler, is not named in this prasasti (the events are dated to around 1018–1019 AD). The Chola military presence in northern Kerala is further corroborated by the Eramam inscription (c. 1020 AD) of the Chera ruler Bhaskara Ravi (10th/11th century AD), which records a meeting at the Chalappuram Temple attended by Rajendra Chola's Samaya Senapati.

== Inscriptions ==
=== Inscriptions mentioning Mushika rules by name/title ===
Inscription	Location	Notes
Ramanthali/Ezhimala-Narayankannur inscription (929 AD)	Ramanthali, near Ezhimala.; A single granite slab in the courtyard of the Narayankannur Temple.	Mentions Mushika Validhara Vikrama Rama.; The so-called Agreement of Muzhikkulam is quoted in the record.; Merchant guild manigramam is appointed as the guardian of the Narayankannur Temple.
Eramam inscription (1020 AD)	Eramam, near Payyanur.; A single slab in the site of the ruined Chalappuram Temple.	Mentions Chera king Bhaskara Ravi Manukuladitya (10th/11th century AD) and Ramakuta Muvar Kantan Karivarman (Srikantha Kartha) (c.1020 AD).; Mentions the merchants guilds of Valanchiyar and Nanadeyar.; Mentions Rajendra Chola Samaya Senapati from Katappa Palli.
Tiruvadur inscription (c. 1020 AD)	Partly in the courtyard of the temple on either side of the sopana.; Partly in the sanctum sanctorum of the temple.	Creation and endowment of a grama (Brahmin settlement) with members chosen from some old grama settlements from central Kerala (Vaikom, Paravur, Avittathoor, Irinjalakuda and Peruvanam).; The engraver is mentioned as Rama Jayamani, the "royal goldsmith of the Mushika king [Jayamani]".
Tiruvalla Copper Plates (Huzur Treasury Plates)	Tiruvalla	Presence of a Ramakuta Muvar (as a donor to the Tiruvalla temple).
Kannapuram inscription (beginning of the 12th century)	Single stone slab fixed on a platform outside the prakara (outer wall) of the Kannapuram temple.	Ramakuta Muvar Udaya Varma is mentioned.

== Inscriptions related to Mushika country ==
=== Records mentioning Chera rulers from Mushika country ===
Inscription	Location	Notes
Panthalayani Kollam inscription (973 AD)	Single stone slab in the upper frame of the srikoyil (central shrine) entrance in Tali temple.	Name of the king – probably Bhaskara Ravi Manukuladitya (10th/11th century AD) – is built over by the present structure.
Pullur Kodavalam inscription (1020 AD)	Pullur, near Kanhangad.; Engraved on a single stone slab in the courtyard of the Pullur Kodavalam Vishnu Temple.	Mentions Chera king Bhaskara Ravi Manukuladitya (962–1021 AD).; Identified king Manukuladitya with king Bhaskara Ravi.
Trichambaram inscription (c. 1040 AD)	Three blocks of granite on the base of the central shrine of the temple.	Mentions Chera king Raja Raja (c. 1036–1089 AD).
Panthalayani Kollam inscription (c. 1089 AD)	Single granite slab in the courtyard of the Panthalayani Kollam Bhagavati temple.; The record was destroyed.	Mentions Chera king Rama Kulasekhara (1089–1122 AD).; The location given as "Kollathu Panthalayani".

=== Miscellaneous records ===
Inscription	Location	Notes
Ramanthali/Ezhimala-Narayankannur inscription (1075 AD)	Ramanthali, near Ezhimala.; Obverse sides of three granite blocks in the base of central shrine of Narayankannur Temple.	Mentions Alupa king Kunda Alupa.
Trichambaram inscription (c. 11th century)	Two granite blocks on the base of the central shrine of the temple.	The chieftain of Eranad Manavepala Mana Viyatan creates an endowment for the thiruvilakku at the Trichambaram Temple.; Manavepala Manaviyatan appears in the famous Jewish copper plates (c. 1000 AD).
Maniyur inscription (c. 11th century)	Single stone slab outside the prakara (outer wall) of the temple.	Maniyur inscriptionConfirms the extension of the so-called Agreement of Muzhikkulam to Mushika country.

== Udaya Varma Kolattiri ==
An inscription discovered from Kannappuram Temple, found fixed on a platform outside the prakara of the temple, in old Malayalam mentions king "Udaya Varma Ramakuta Muvar". The record give details of land set apart for the expenses of the Kannapuram Temple. The inscription can be attributed to the early years of the 12th century on the basis of script and language.

Inscription	Location	Notes
Kannapuram inscription (beginning of the 12th century)	Single stone slab fixed on a platform outside the prakara (outer wall) of the Kannapuram temple.	Ramakuta Muvar Udaya Varma is mentioned.

King Udaya Varma of Karippattu palace in Kolattunadu is described as a favourite of the medieval Chera king in traditional Kerala chronicles. He is described as the overlord of the Fort Valapattanam, the medieval Chera king's Palace, the Taliparamba Temple, and the Perinchellur Brahmin village.
