= Tolan (medieval poet) =

9th-century Indian poet

Tolan (fl. 9th century AD), also romanized as Tholan, was an early medieval south Indian poet remembered for composing Malayalam passages of the art-form Koodiyattam. He was a courtier and friend of king Kulasekhara Varma (identified with Sthanu Ravi Kulasekhara, c. 844/45 – c. 870/71 AD). Tolan wrote the elaborate Malayalam passages for the vidushaka's speeches in Koodiyattam. These passages were probably intended for a native (Malayalam) audience at the temple.

Tolan is also credited with the authorship of the lost historical kavya "Mahodayapuresa-charitha". It has also been suggested that he might be identical to the Mushika or Ezhimala court poet Atula.

== See also ==
- Koothu
- Koodiyattam
- Malayalam literature
