= Ezhimala (hill, Kannur) =

Hill in Kerala, India

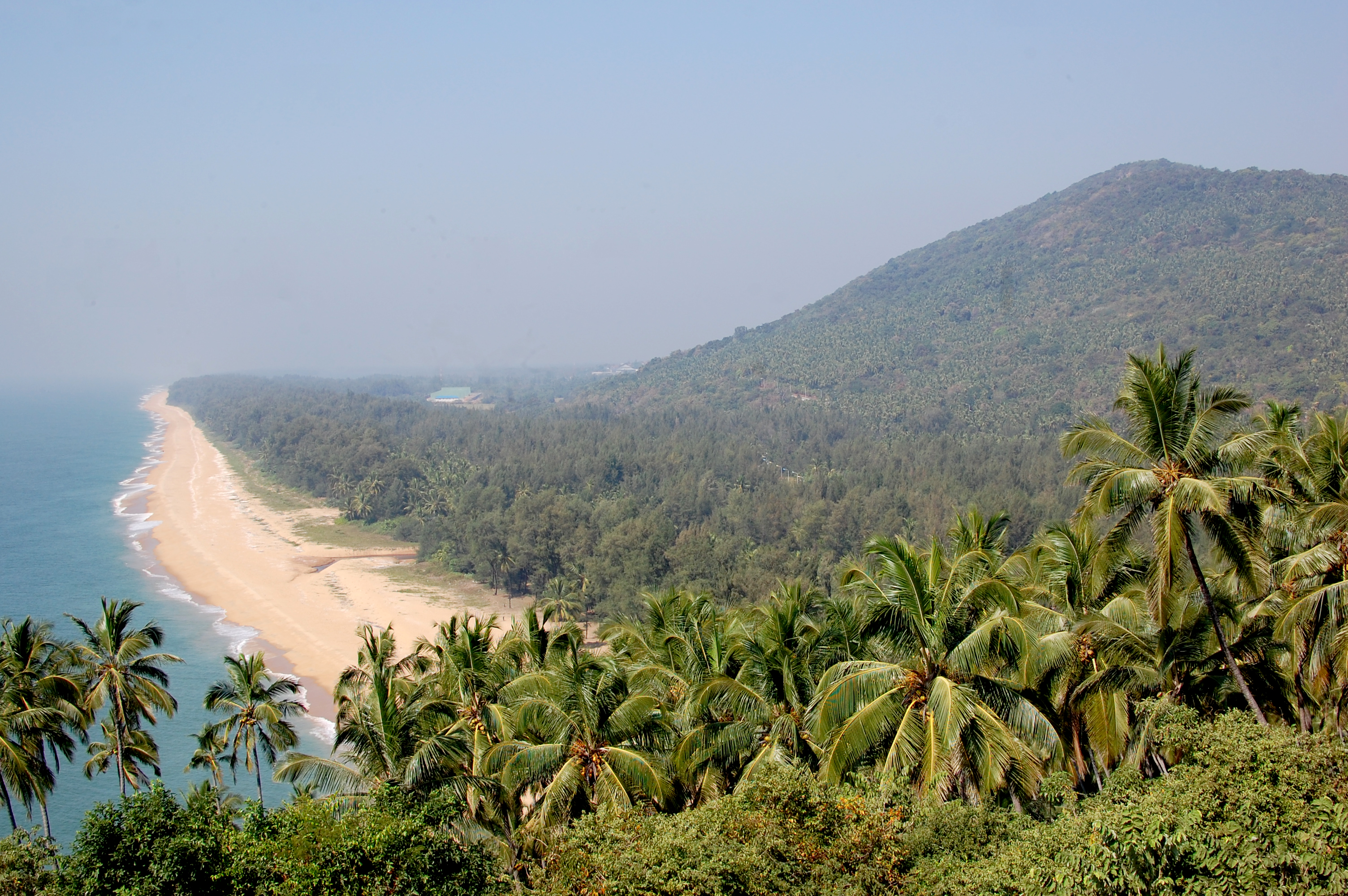
- Ezhimala

Highest point
- Elevation: 286 m (938 ft)
- Coordinates: 12°01′06″N 75°12′57″E

Geography
- Location within Kerala
- Location: Kerala, India
- Country: India
- Parent range: Independent, adjacent to the Arabian Sea

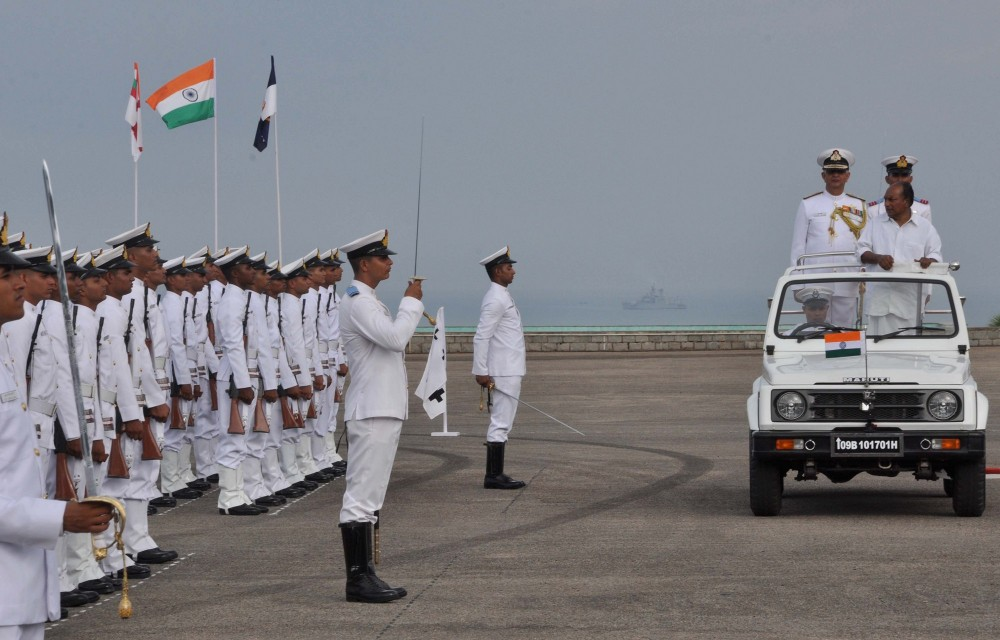
Naval Academy, Ezhimala

Ezhimala, a hill reaching a height of 286 metres (938 ft), is located near Payyanur, in Kannur district of Kerala, South India. It is a part of a conspicuous and isolated cluster of hills, forming a promontory, 38 km (24 mi) north of Kannur (Cannanore). The Indian Naval Academy at Ezhimala is Asia's largest, and the world's third-largest, naval academy.

As the former capital of the ancient Kolathunadu Kingdom of the Mushikas, Ezhimala is considered to be an important historical site. A flourishing seaport and center of trade around the beginning of the Common Era, it was also one of the major battlefields of the Chola-Chera Wars in the 11th century. It is believed by some that Buddha had visited Ezhimala. The Kolathunadu (Kannur) Kingdom at the peak of its power, reportedly extended from Netravati River (Mangalore) in the north to Korapuzha (Kozhikode) in the south with Arabian Sea on the west and Kodagu hills on the eastern boundary, also including the isolated islands of Lakshadweep in the Arabian Sea.

== Etymology ==
Historically, the Ezhimala hills were a prominent and important maritime landmark. Ships crossing the Indian Ocean from Arabia and East Africa with the monsoon winds usually first sighted the south Indian coast around Ezhimala, and oriented themselves from there.

The hills is also known as Elimala, Mooshika Sailam and Sapta Sailam.

The hill was known as Ras Haili or Hili to Arab sailors. The hill had been named Monte d'Eli by the Portuguese. and was known as Mount Delly, Mount Dilly, Delyn, or Mount Eli to the British.

Hobson-Jobson suggests the original name "Elimala" comes from the Malayalam term "Eli Mala" (meaning "High Mountain"), and rejects alternative etymologies from "Elu Mala" (meaning "Seven Hills"), or "Elam" (meaning cardamom). It contends the term "Sapta Sailam" ("Seven Hills"), found in a local Sanskrit text was just a misinterpretation of "Eli" as "Elu" by the writer. As the pronunciation of the consonant "l" in modern Malayalam is often better rendered as "zh", thus "Elimala" and "Ezhimala" are just alternative English transliterations of the same Malayalam word.

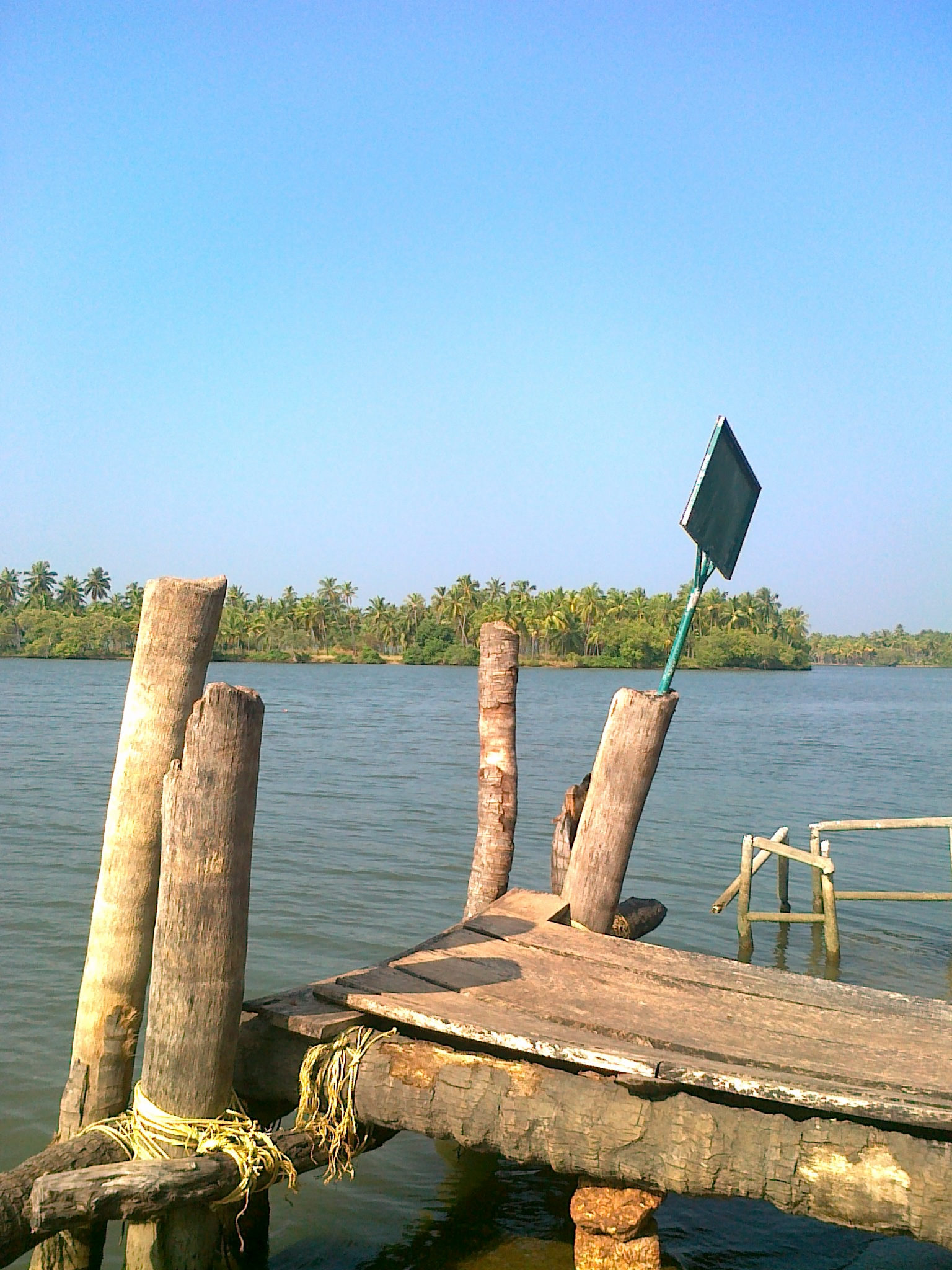
Backwaters in Ezhimala

== History ==
The ancient port of Naura, which is mentioned in the Periplus of the Erythraean Sea as a port somewhere north of Muziris is somewhere near Ezhimala.

Names, routes and locations of the Periplus of the Erythraean Sea (1st century CE)

Pliny the Elder (1st century CE) states that the port of Tyndis was located at the northwestern border of Keprobotos (Chera dynasty). The part of the Malabar Coast which lies north of the port at Tyndis was ruled by the kingdom of Ezhimala during Sangam period. According to the Periplus of the Erythraean Sea, a region known as Limyrike began at Naura and Tyndis. However the Ptolemy mentions only Tyndis as the Limyrike's starting point. The region probably ended at Kanyakumari; it thus roughly corresponds to the present-day Malabar Coast. The value of Rome's annual trade with the region was estimated at around 50,000,000 sesterces. Pliny the Elder mentioned that Limyrike was prone by pirates. The Cosmas Indicopleustes mentioned that the Limyrike was a source of peppers.

Ezhimala kingdom based at Ezhimala had jurisdiction over two Nadus - The coastal Poozhinadu and the hilly eastern Karkanadu. According to the works of Sangam literature, Poozhinadu consisted much of the coastal belt between Mangalore and Kozhikode. Karkanadu consisted of Wayanad-Gudalur hilly region with parts of Kodagu (Coorg). It is said that Nannan, the most renowned ruler of Ezhimala dynasty, took refuge at Wayanad hills in fifth century CE when he was lost to Cheras, just before his execution in a battle, according to the Sangam works. Ezhimala kingdom was succeeded by Mushika dynasty in the early medieval period, most possibly due to the migration of Tuluva Brahmins from Tulu Nadu. An Old Malayalam inscription (Ramanthali inscriptions), dated to 1075 CE, mentions king Kunda Alupa, the ruler of Alupa dynasty of Mangalore, can be found at Ezhimala. The Indian anthropologist Ayinapalli Aiyappan states that a powerful and warlike clan of the Bunt community of Tulu Nadu was called Kola Bari and the Kolathiri Raja of Kolathunadu may have been related to this clan. The Arabic inscription on a copper slab within the Madayi Mosque, which lies about 3 km away from Ezhimala, records its foundation year as 1124 CE. The Kolathunadu (Kannur) Kingdom at the peak of its power, reportedly extended from Netravati River (Mangalore) in the north to Korapuzha (Kozhikode) in the south with Arabian Sea on the west and Kodagu hills on the eastern boundary, also including the isolated islands of Lakshadweep in the Arabian Sea.

Ezhimala, which is part of Ramanthali panchayath, is one of the most important places in the recorded history of Kerala. From before the period of known history, some chapters of the Ramayana and local Hindu legends associate the Ezhimala Hills with the epic, in particular with Hanuman.

Ezhimala, Pazhayangadi, and several villages and towns in this region find plenty of mention in the extant Tamil Sangam Period's literature (500 BC to 300 AD). Pazhayangadi is the present corrupted form of its ancient name of Pazhi. Pazhi is mentioned as the ancient capital of King Udayan Venmon Nannan (known as Nannan or Nandan) of the Mushika or Kolathiri Royal Family. Though the Dynasty of Nannans was a cousin or sister dynasty of the Cheras and Pandyas and Cholas, warfare among them was nearly consistent, and the period of Nannan was no exception. There are texts that speak of Nannan fighting heroic battles at Pazhi against the Chera Kings who invaded his kingdom (Kolathunadu). Eventually, Nannan was killed in battle by the Chera king, Narmudi Cheral. Like the other kings of the then Tamilakam cultural polity, Narmudi Cheral was a great patron of scholars and poets, and he once gifted his court-poet, Kappiyattu Kappiyanar with 40 lakhs gold coins, as a token of his poetic genius.

The entire South India coast was a hub of Indian Ocean trade during the era. According to Kerala Muslim tradition, Kolathunadu was home to several oldest mosques in the Indian subcontinent. According to the Legend of Cheraman Perumals, the first Indian mosque was built in 624 AD at Kodungallur with the mandate of the Cheraman Perumal) of Chera dynasty, during the lifetime of Muhammad (c. 570–632). According to Qissat Shakarwati Farmad, the Masjids at Kodungallur, Kollam, Madayi, Barkur, Mangalore, Kasaragod, Kannur, Dharmadam, Panthalayani, and Chaliyam, were built during the era of Malik Dinar, and they are among the oldest Masjids in the Indian subcontinent. It is believed that Malik Dinar died at Thalangara in Kasaragod town. Most of them lie in the region that made up the erstwhile Ezhimala kingdom. The Koyilandy Jumu'ah Mosque contains an Old Malayalam inscription written in a mixture of Vatteluttu and Grantha scripts which dates back to tenth century CE. It is a rare surviving document recording patronage by a Hindu king (Bhaskara Ravi) to the Muslims of Kerala. The Arabic inscription on a copper slab within the Madayi Mosque in records its foundation year as 1124 CE. The 16th century Tuhfat Ul Mujahideen also states about Madayi. Madayi is located just 5 km (3.1 mi) away from Ezhimala.

Extant Tamil Sangam texts describe the glory and wealth of the ancient Pazhi in the highest terms. Sangam Era poets, as well as Classical Tamil poets of later centuries, like Paranar, speak of the wealth of Pazhi in the greatest degree. One of the Sangam pieces, Akam 173 speaks of "Nannan's great mountain slopes where goldfields abound, and long bamboos dried in the Sun burst and released the unfinished pearls." Noted scholar, Elamkulam Kunjan Pillai states that "It is from the Kottayam Town (in Kannur District) and Kannur Town regions of old Ezhimalainad that innumerable Roman (gold) coins have been excavated. On one (single) occasion (gold) coins that could be carried by six porters were obtained. These coins were found to belong to the period down to 491 AD".

Ezhimala was also a flourishing seaport and center of trade at least by the start of the Common Era; and later was also one of the major battlefields of the series of Chola-Chera Wars in the 11th century; some believe that Buddha had visited Ezhimala.

The Mushika-vamsha Mahakavya, written by Athula in the 11th century, throws light on the recorded past of the Mushika Royal Family up until that point. The first recorded king of Mooshika Vamsham (the Mooshika Dynasty) was Ramaghata Mooshika and his capital most probably was Pazhi (ancient Pazhayangadi). Athulan describes the later kings of this dynasty who are now better known as the Kolathiri Dynasty. King Ramaghata Mooshika's successors shifted their capital to Ezhimala, Valabhapattanam (Valapattanam), and eventually Chirakkal, among other nearby places, over the following centuries.

== Indian Naval Academy ==
The former Prime Minister, Dr Manmohan Singh, inaugurated the Indian Naval Academy in Ezhimala, which is the largest in Asia, on 8 January 2009. This institution trains officer candidates of the Indian Navy and the Indian Coast Guard.

== Transportation ==
The national highway passes through Perumba junction. Mangalore, Goa and Mumbai can be accessed on the northern side and Cochin and Thiruvananthapuram can be accessed on the southern side. The road to the east of Iritty connects to Mysore and Bangalore. The nearest railway station is Payyanur on Mangalore-Palakkad line. There are airports at Mangalore, Kannur and Calicut.

== See also ==
- Mount Formosa
- Ramanthali inscriptions
- Kannur
- Payyanur
- Mushika Kingdom
- Malabar
- Kerala
- Kannur District
- Mangalore
- Indian Naval Academy
