= Mount Formosa =

Portuguese-British colonial-era

Mount Formosa was the Portuguese-British colonial-era name attributed to a group of contiguous hills near Kanhangad, Kerala, India. The British colonial geographer and historian James Horsburgh stated that it is approximately located at 12° 22′ N latitude, at a distance of about 9 nautical leagues from Mangalore and about 6 - 6.5 nautical leagues from Mount Dilly.
