= Thiruvalla copper plates =

Medieval artefacts from Kerala, India

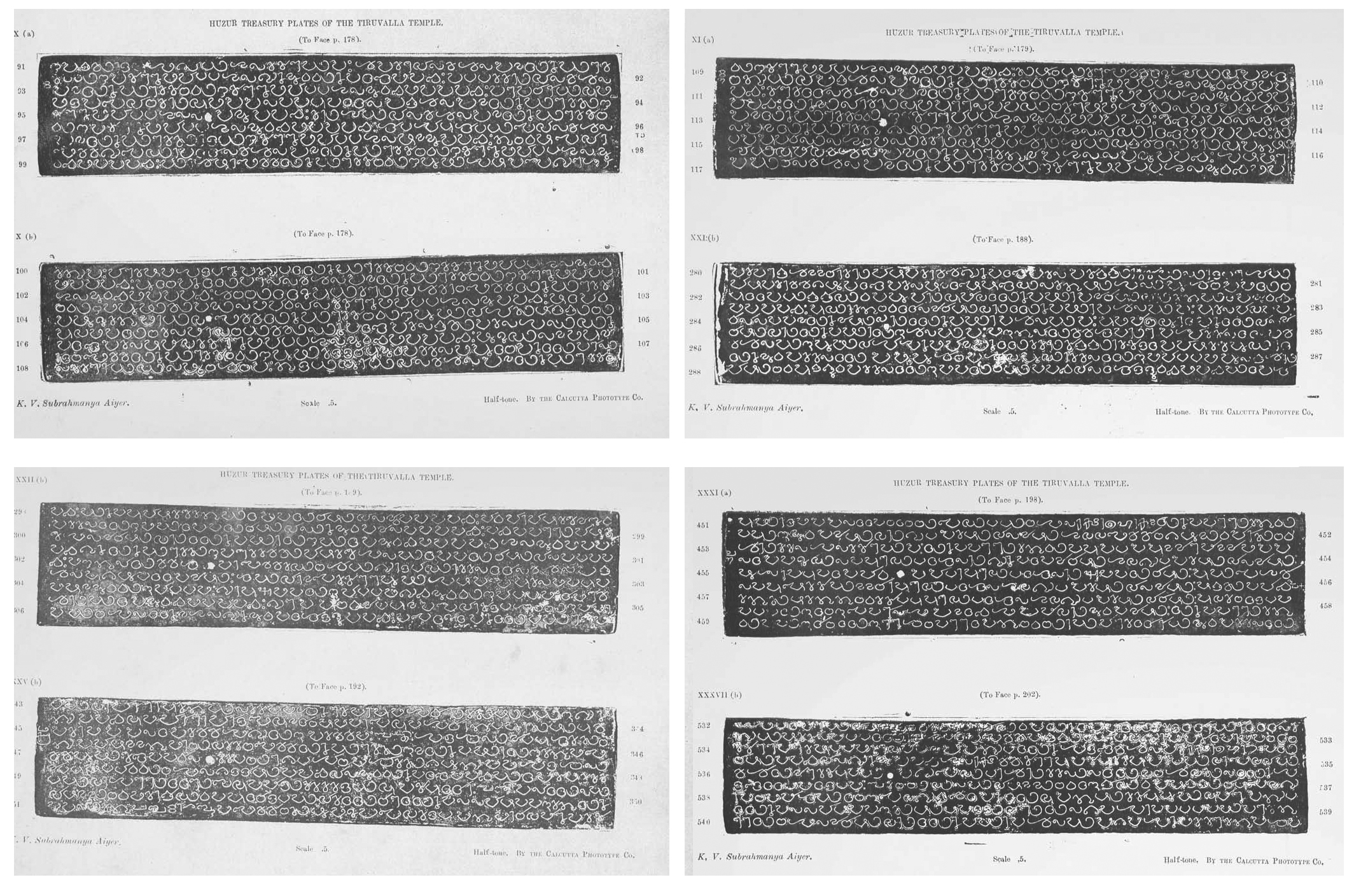
Thiruvalla copper plates

Thiruvalla copper plates, also known as the Huzur Treasury Plates, are a collection of medieval temple committee resolutions found at the Sreevallabha Temple in Thiruvalla, Kerala, India. The collection of plates, engraved in Vattezhuthu with some Grantha characters, can be dated to 10th and 11th centuries AD.

The collection consist of forty three plates with writing on both sides, but more than half a dozen plates are missing. The contents of the copper plates belong to different periods. The plates were collected, rearranged and edited at a late date. The plates are considered as a treasure trove of information about medieval temple rituals, deities, festivals, castes, professions, personal names, plot names, and prices.

The plates were first published in Travancore Archaeological Series by T. A. Gopinatha Rao, under the title "The Huzur Treasury Plates". They were originally kept in the Sreevallabha Temple, Thiruvalla (now with Archeological Department of Kerala).

== Major donors to Thiruvalla Temple ==
=== Kings and queens ===
- Chola king Parantaka Vira Chola (907―955 AD)
- Kizhan Adikal (queen of Parantaka)
- Chera Perumal king Bhaskara Ravi Manukuladitya (962―1021 AD).
- Nambirattiyar (queen of Chera Perumal)

=== Kerala chieftains ===
- Ramakuda Muvar, chieftain of Kolathu-nadu
- Eran Chankaran, chieftain of Purakizha-nadu
- Ravi Chirikandan, chieftain of Vembanadu
- Kumaran Yakkan, chieftain of Vembanadu Thekkin-Kuru
- Kantan Kumaran Maluvakkon, chieftain of Kizhmalai-nadu
- Raman Kotavarman, chieftain of Munji-nadu
- Raman Madevi, wife of the chieftain of Munji-nadu
- Munjimarayar, chieftain of Munji-nadu
- Venattadikal, chieftain of Venad
