= Ramanthali inscriptions =

Ramanthali Inscription (Mushika)
- Ezhimala-Narayankannur Inscription
- Material: Granite
- Writing: Early Malayalam
- Created: 929 CE; Kerala
- Present location: Narayankannur Temple

Ramanthali Inscription (Alupa)
- Ezhimala-Narayankannur Inscription
- Material: Granite
- Writing: Early Malayalam
- Created: 1075 CE; Kerala
- Present location: Narayankannur Temple

Ramanthali inscriptions, also known as Ezhimala-Narayankannur inscriptions, are two medieval stone epigraphs from Ramanthali, near Ezhimala in Kannur district, Kerala. The first inscription, mentioning Mushika (Malayalam: Ezhimala) Validhara Vikrama Rama and the merchant guild manigramam, is dated to 929 CE and the second inscription, mentioning Alupa king Kunda Alupa, is dated to 1075 CE. Both inscriptions are written in old Malayalam with Vattezhuthu script (with some Grantha characters).

- The first inscription can be found on a single granite slab in the courtyard of the Narayankannur Temple. It records the original endowment to the temple by Mushika Validhara Vikrama Rama in 929 CE. He donates land for nanda vilakku (the permanent lamp) and nivedyam (the food offering) to the deity Narasinga Vinnakar Thevar. The so-called Agreement of Muzhikkulam is quoted in the record. Merchant guild manigramam was appointed as the guardian of the temple.
- The second inscription, dated to 1075 CE, is engraved on obverse sides of three granite blocks in the base of central shrine of Narayankannur Temple. This is the second dated inscription of Alupa king Kunda Alupa who probably extended his influence to northern parts of the Kannur district in the 11th century CE. The temple inscription shows the time of the renovation of the temple (including construction of the image of the deity, and the srikoyil, and the shrine). The srikoyil (central shrine) of the temple was built in granite with the help of king Kunda Alupa.

King Kunda Alupa is also mentioned in a Sanskrit record (dated 1068 AD) from Kadri Manjunatha Temple, Mangalore also.
