= Mushika-vamsha =

Mushika-vamsha (IAST: Mūṣika-vaṃśa mahā-kāvyam) is a Sanskrit dynastic chronicle composed in 11th century by poet Atula. It narrates the legendary history of the Mushika dynasty, which ruled the northern part of the present-day Kerala state of India. The chronicle moves from mythological beginnings of the founding ancestors to more authentic genealogical history in later chapters (sargas).

Several kings mentioned in the text, such as Validhara Vikrama Rama (c. 929), Jayamani and Kantan Karivarman (Srikantha Kartha) (both c. 1020) and Chera king Kota Ravi Vijayaraga (c. 883–913) can be found in the medieval inscriptions discovered from north Kerala.

== Date ==
Mushika-vamsha is believed to have been written during the reign of the Mushika ruler Shrikantha, who is assumed to be a contemporary of the 11th century Chola ruler Rajendra I (see Historicity below). If this belief is true, Mushika-vamsha is the earliest known historical Sanskrit mahakavya, pre-dating Kalhana's Rajatarangini by a few decades.

Indologist A. K. Warder classifies Atula's style as Vaidarbhi, and believes that he was influenced by the 6th century poet Bharavi, among others.

== Plot ==
=== Origin of the dynasty ===
...you should not take your own unhappy life,
Nor yet ought you to obstruct this offspring
left like this in you by your husband.

— Mushika-vamsha introductory verse, describing how the royal preceptor dissuaded the queen from committing suicide

Atula provides a mythological origin of the Mushika dynasty, tracing its descent to a Heheya queen, whose family was killed during Parashurama's slaughter of the Kshatriya rulers. The pregnant queen initially wanted to commit suicide, but her family preceptor dissuaded her from doing so, encouraging her not to destroy her unborn baby. With the help of the preceptor, the queen fled southwards, and came to the coastal region that later became the Mushika kingdom. There, she was attacked by a huge rat (mushika), who was actually the divine spirit of the Eli mountain (Ezhimala), and had been cursed by the sage Kaushika to become a rat. The queen burned the rat to ashes with the flame emitted from her eyes: the rat was thus redeemed, and became transformed into its original form.

=== Rama, the dynasty's founder ===
At the request of the divine spirit, the queen started living in a cave of the mountain, protected from Parashurama. There, she gave birth to a boy, who received education from the preceptor. By the time the prince grew up, Parashurama had wiped the Kshatriyas from the earth 21 times. Feeling sorry for their widows, he decided to perform a ritual sacrifice to absolve himself from the sin of killing the Kshatriyas at the Eli mountain. For one of the sacrificial ceremonies, he needed a Kshatriya prince. The divine spirit of the mountain brought to him the Heheya prince, who belonged to the lunar dynasty. After the end of Parashurama's ceremony, the prince was crowned as a king, and thus, became the founder of the Mushika dynasty. Since Parashurama performed his consecration with the holy water from a ghata (earthen pot), the king came to be known as Rama-ghata-mushika.

The first six cantos deal with the exploits of Rama. He established a council of ministers, and his favourite minister was Mahanavika ("great sailor"), a member of the trading class (Shreshti) of Mahishmati. Rama also established the fortified city of Kolam, and the Mushika rulers came to be known as Kolabhupas. Once, he visited the hermitage of Parashurama, who gave him an invincible bow called Ajita and several divine missiles. Meanwhile, he received the news that his ancestral Heheya kingdom had been conquered by the Magadhas. Rama wanted to march against Magadha, but his ministers advised him to subjugated the southern kingdoms first. After consolidating his rule in southern India, Rama crossed the Vindhya mountain, and asked the Magadha ruler Suvarman to hand over the former Heheya territory to him. When Suvarman refused, the two kings fought a battle in which Suvarman used divine missiles, but Rama could counter him without use of Parashurama's divine missiles. Ultimately, Rama defeated and killed him in a duel. The vassals of Magadha accepted his suzerainty. He married Suvarman's daughter, and restored the Magadha territory to Suvarman's son.

Gradually, Rama conquered the entire Bharata (India) and "the islands", and became a Chakravartin (universal emperor). He appointed his elder son Vatu as the ruler of the Heheya kingdom, and returned to Kola with his younger son Nandana. At Kola, he performed a horse sacrifice, and after a long time, retired to penance, crowning Nandana as the new king of the Mushika kingdom.

=== Nandana and his successors ===
The very skilful girl friend, having understood the emotion
of the playful one whose mind was besieged by Love,
On the pretext of a spray she could pick with her own hand,
led the beloved to a deserted creeper-house.

— Mushika-vamsha 7.65, describing an incident during Nandana's stay with young women in a mountain forest

The Cantos 7-10 describe the "amorous exploits" of Nandana: the poet describes him as a mighty and glorious monarch, but does not describe his achievements as a king. Nandana was succeeded by Ugra; Canto 11 lists the names of the next 51 rulers (all patrilineal descendants).

Ugrasena, the sixth successor of Nandana, repulsed an invasion from the Kerala Kingdom. His successor Chitrasena was killed by a lion during a hunting expedition. The next ruler Shatasoma, described as a descendant of the solar dynasty, performed a hundred horse sacrifices. On the advice of sage Agastya, he visited Kailasha and brought a sacred idol of the god Shiva. This idol was installed in a newly-constructed shrine at Celera (also known as Cellura, Taliparamba or Lakshmipura).

Shatasoma's descendant Sharmadatta obtained the boon of living as long as he wished from Shiva, for himself and his 20 descendants. His descendant Vatukavarman built the large Vatukeshvara Shiva temple at Alashuddhi. His successor Ahirana built the Ahiraneshvara Shiva temple on the western bank of the Pṛthana river (identified as Valapattanam). Ahirana's son Ranabhara was attracted some girls while chasing elephants in the Sahya mountains. He followed them into a big cave, spent some days with a thousand cave girls, and then brought them to his kingdom using an elixir. After the birth of his son Aryagupta, he entered the cave once again, accompanied by many women.

Aryagupta's son Achala built the city of Achalapattana on the Eli mountain. His younger son Vikramasena ascended the throne after expelling the elder son Ashvasena from the kingdom. Vikramasena's son Vinayavarman ruled by dharma, and the next ruler Rajavarman built a Buddhist monastery (vihara) called Rajavihara.

Ashvasena's son Jayamanin I became the next ruler with the help of an army from the Pandya kingdom. Jayamanin's grandson Udayavarman patronized Brahmins. The next ruler Virochana I killed a Pallava king, and married his daughter Harini. Two of his descendants—Shashidatta and Janavrata—killed each other in order to seize the throne. Nothing is known about the last 38 kings mentioned in the Canto 11, except their names.

=== Kunchivarman and Ishanavarman ===
Where (in Kola) the totality of deities live together
like the species of animals of the forest who have found a place
In a hermitage of successful ascetics,
perceived in the world as extremely contradictory.

— Mushika-vamsha 12.112, describing the tolerance for different faiths in the Mushika kingdom

Canto 12 begins with the reign of Kunchivarman, whose daughter married the ruler of the neighbouring Kerala Kingdom. His son Ishanavarman married Nandini, the daughter of a Chedi king who had been dethroned. Ishanavarman led an army to Chedi, and restored the throne to his father-in-law. Upon his return to the Mushika kingdom, he faced an invasion from the Kerala king Jayaraga. The warring kings decided to engage in a personal combat, but the Kerala prince Goda and Ishanavarman's nephew negotiated a peace treaty between the two kingdoms. Ishanavarman and Nandini did not have any children, so he married a Chola princess, with whom he had a son named Nrparama (or Nrpavarman).

=== Nandini's descendants ===
An upset Nandini prayed to the goddess Bhadrakali (or Chandika), and obtained a boon that the Mushika throne would be passed on to the sons of the female members of her family. (The manuscript is mutilated here, but it is clear that the Goddess says something about women: the editor theorized that the goddess talks about matrilineal descent, which is what effectively happens in the subsequent portions of the text.) Sometime later, she gave birth to a son named Palaka, and a daughter named Nandini (II). To avoid a war of succession between Nrparama and Palaka, Ishanavarman sent Palaka to the Chedi kingdom. Ishanavarman patronized scholars, and built several Shiva temples. Towards the end of his life, he suffered from a severe fever, and died after performing a Mahadana ("Great Donation") ceremony.

The ministers then appointed Nrparama as the new king, whose infant son Chandravarman became the titular ruler after his death. Taking advantage of this situation, the Kerala king invaded the Mushika kingdom, whose ministers recalled Palaka from Chedi. Palaka repulsed the invasion, slaughtered the enemies on the battlefield, and became the king. He was succeeded by Validhara, the son of his sister.

Validhara defended his kingdom against the Ganga invaders, and was succeeded by his maternal nephews, first Ripurama, and then Vikramarama. Vikramarama build a huge wall of large rocks to prevent a Buddha (Jina) shrine from being swallowed by the Arabian Sea. (This temple remains unidentified, and was probably lost to the sea in the later years.) His successors were Janamani, Samghavarman (or Shankhavarman), Jayamani (Jayamanin II), and Valabha I.

Excellent women emerged from the houses because of the threshing fire,
their children hanging on to them in the danger;
Their very unsteady hands
waving to the dancing of their braids of hair.

— Mushika-vamsha 13.34, describing the burning of Manapura by Gambhira's forces

Valabha I, described in Canto 13, was a powerful warrior king, who subjugated the chieftain of Bhatasthali, and made his relative Nrparama the in-charge of that territory. His younger brother and successor Kundavarman built the Narayananapura city and a Vishnu temple in that city. The next ruler Palaka was a son of a sister of Kundavarman. At the time of his death, Palaka did not have an adult younger brother or a maternal nephew. He was succeeded by Ripurama, a chieftain of Bhatasthali. After a glorious reign, Ripurama was succeeded by Gambhira, a son of Palaka's sister. Gambhira was a strong ruler, who crushed a revolt by the subordinate chief of Marupura, and burnt down that city.

=== Vallabha II ===
Jayamani (Jayamanin III), the successor and younger brother of Gambhira, became a renowned ruler. During the last years of his reign, he was assisted in administration by his nephew, the crown prince Valabha II. Valabha II, said to be an incarnation, partially that of Shiva and partially that of Vishnu, made grants to the Vedic agrahara of Cellura. This agrahara is described as a hermitage with a variety of trees.

At Cellura, there were two head brahmanas (priests) named Bhava and Nandin, said to have descended from the heavens. They are compared to Shukra and Brihaspati (the teachers of the Asura and Devas respectively, in Hindu mythology). Vallabha visited the "cities" (shrines) of Vishnu and Shiva, the latter of which had been built by the earlier king Shatasoma, and paid obeisance to the deities. He commissioned repairs to these two temples, which had decayed with age, and gave benedictions to the brahmanas before leaving.

Jayamani made Vallabha his heir apparent, and then asked him to march to aid the Kerala king, who was preparing to attack the Chola king. Vallabha had to abandon the march midway, when a loyal subject told him that Jayamani had died, and an enemy named Ramavikrama had usurped the throne. Vallabha sent an envoy to the Kerala king, and then turned back towards the Mushika capital. On the way back, he visited the Mulavasa shrine, and paid obeisance to the Buddha.

His belly rent by a sharp sword,
though fallen on the ground unconscious,
The enemy soldier slowly regained consciousness
through the breeze from the wings of a bird violently dragging out his intestines

— Mushika-vamsha 14.33, describing the battle between Vallabha and Ramavikrama

Vallabha's army defeated Ramavikrama's forces in a fierce battle. Vallabha punished the surviving dissidents, and took control of the Mushika kingdom. The poet describes his coronation and construction activities in detail. Vallabha built the city of Marahi, an international commercial port, at the mouth of the Killa river. He also built the Vallabhapatnam fort, named after himself. He installed a statue of Shiva at the Vatukeshvara temple. His army crossed the ocean, and conquered many islands.

=== Shrikantha ===
Vallabha II was succeeded by his younger brother Shrikantha (IAST: Śrīkaṇṭha) alias Rajavarman. He commissioned restoration of the Vatukeshvara, Kharavana, and Ahiraneshvara temples. He restored the wealth that the enemies had plundered from the temples, and paid obeisance to Shiva. The extant text breaks off after a description of the Shiva worship and rituals.

== Historicity ==
The poet Atula was primarily focused on eulogizing the dynasty's rulers, rather than on describing their reign based on the historical facts. The first six cantos, which are about the dynasty's founder Rama, describe an ideal ruler rather than a historical figure. There is no evidence that a ruler from present-day Kerala conquered Magadha or other regions of northern India.

Although the text's description of the dynasty's origin is purely legendary, some historians, such as M. G. S. Narayanan, believe that it indicates northern origins of the dynasty. Narayanan theorizes that the Mushika family may have migrated from the Heheya kingdom of Central India to Kerala at the beginning of the Mauryan rule.

Nandana of Atula's text may be same as Nannan, a king described in the Tamil Sangam literature, but this cannot be said with certainty. According to the Sangam literature, Nannan ruled Ezhilmalai (Eli mountain), and fought many battles against the neighbouring rulers. However, Atula does not credit Nandana with any military achievements.

Indologist A. K. Warder notes that the story of Shiva's boon (of living as long as they wished) to Sharmadatta and his 20 successors solves the chronological inconsistencies arising from dating the dynasty's origin to Parashurama's time, by allowing as much as hundred years for the kings' lifespans. All of these kings appear to be imaginary.

Canto 12 onwards, the text describes rulers who can be identified as historical figures. However, not all of the events described in this and subsequent cantos are historical. For example, Ishanavarman's purported march to Chedi is of doubtful historicity, although his conflict with the Kerala king seems to have some historical basis.

Shrikantha is identified with king Kandan (Kantan) Karivarman mentioned in the Eramam inscription, which records the Samayasanketam ceremony conducted at the Chalappuram temple during Kandan's reign. The inscription also mentions Rajendra-chola Samayasenapati of Kadappappalli, who is identified as the 11th century Chola king Rajendra. The Mushika-vamsha mentions that Shrikantha restored the temples that had been plundered by the enemies, and then ends abruptly after describing the worship rituals at the restored temples. It appears that the Chola king Rajendra successfully invaded Kerala around 1020, and Atula has omitted this fact to avoid spoiling his glorious description of Vallabha's reign. Shrikantha seems to have restored the temples in the aftermath of this first Chola invasion, as described in the Mushika-vamsha and the Eramam inscription. The Kerala kingdom subsequently rebelled against Rajendra's overlordship, leading to a second Chola invasion around 1028, in which both the Kerala king and Kandan were killed.
