= Pullur Kodavalam inscription =

Medieval Chera inscription in Kerala, India

Pullur Kodavalam Inscription
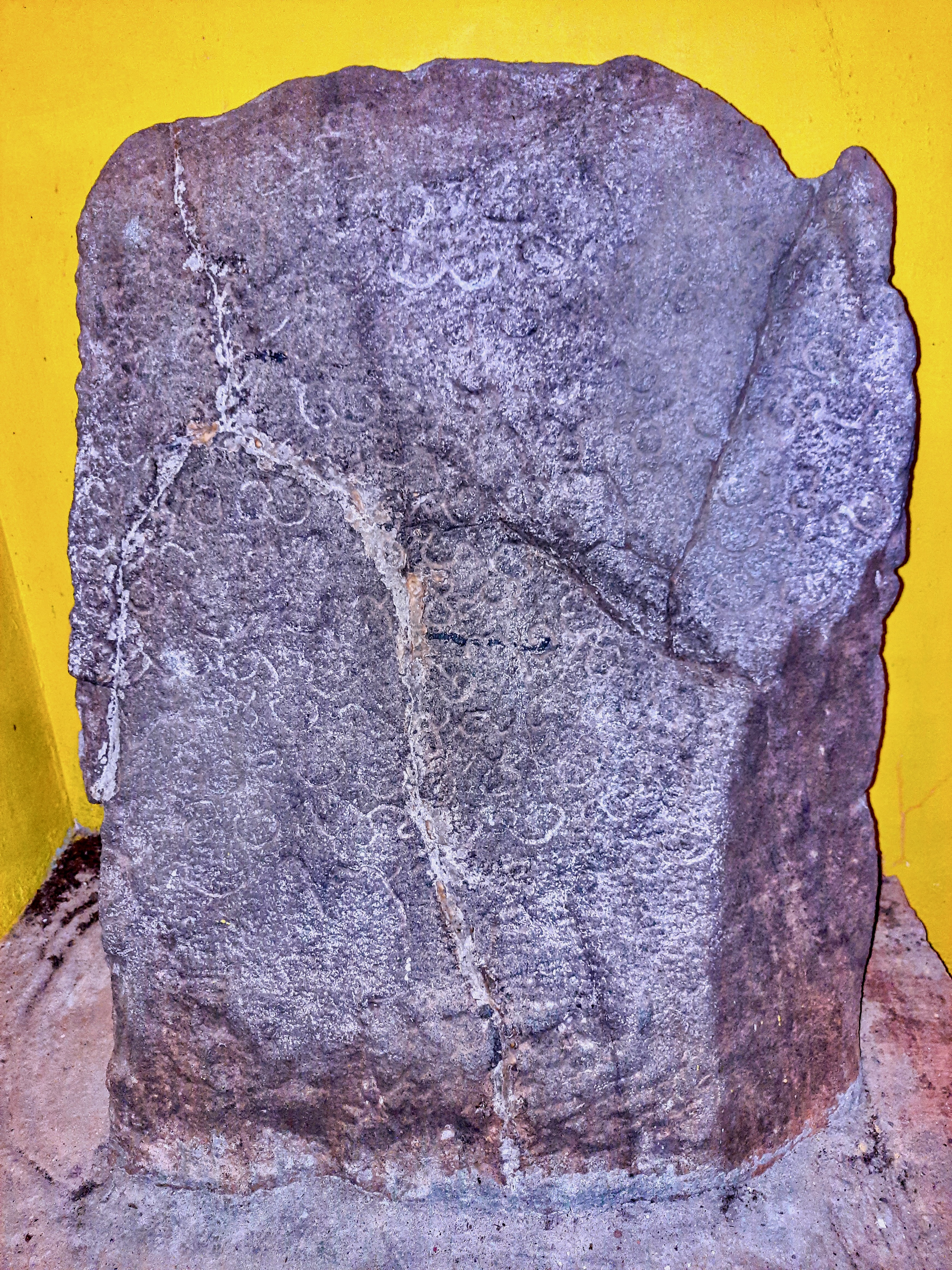
- Pullur Kodavalam Inscription
- Material: Stone
- Writing: Early Malayalam
- Created: c. 1020 AD; Kerala
- Present location: Pullur Kodavalam Vishnu Temple

The Pullur Kodavalam inscription (dated to c. 1020 AD) is an early 11th century stone inscription from Pullur, near Kanhangad in Kerala, south India. The old Malayalam inscription in Vattezhuthu script (with additional Grantha characters) is engraved on a single stone slab in the courtyard of the Pullur Kodavalam Vishnu Temple [14 lines, obverse side only].

The inscription relates to the rule of medieval Chera king Bhaskara Ravi "Manukuladitya" (r. c. 959/60 – c.1025/26 AD, revised chronology) in Kasaragodu. It is the geographically northernmost available epigraphical record mentioning a medieval Chera king of Kerala. The analysis of the inscription (1969) also identified king "Manukuladitya" with king Bhaskara Ravi.

- The record falls under the A-series inscriptions of king Bhaskara Ravi (dated to 58th [A-series] regnal year). Initially, the regnal year was misunderstood as 55th (ARIE, 1967).
- The record says that the uralar (proprietors) of Kudavalam village installed the inscribed stone showing three "kazhanju" (weight used as a standard) of gold as the amount of annual dues ("attaikkol") fixed by royal order to be paid to the king (from that village).
- It also helps in the dating of Sanskrit philosopher-poet Sarvajnatma (author of Vedantic "Samkshapasaririka" and disciple of certain Devesvara) and Sanskrit Yamaka poet Narayana.
- King "Manukuladitya" was formerly identified with Chalukya ruler Vikramaditya II (R. G. Bhandarkar) or Chola ruler Aditya I (S. V. Venkatesvara Ayyar and K. V. Krishna Ayyar)
