= Athula =

Athula (IAST: Atula), fl. 11th century AD, was a medieval Sanskrit-language poet from the Mushika or Ezhimala kingdom, located in present-day northern Kerala (the Malabar Coast), south India. He is best known for composing the Mushika-vamsa-kavya, a mahakavya (epic poem) about the ruling dynasty of the kingdom.

The dynastic chronicle was composed in the court of Mushika ruler Srikantha ("Kantan Karivarman", in Malayalam). Athula is sometimes alternatively dated to the first half of the 12th century AD (Unni, 1980). It has also been suggested that he might be identical to the Chera court poet Tholan.
