= Sreevallabha Temple =

Hindu temple in India

- ശ്രീവല്ലഭ മഹാക്ഷേത്രം
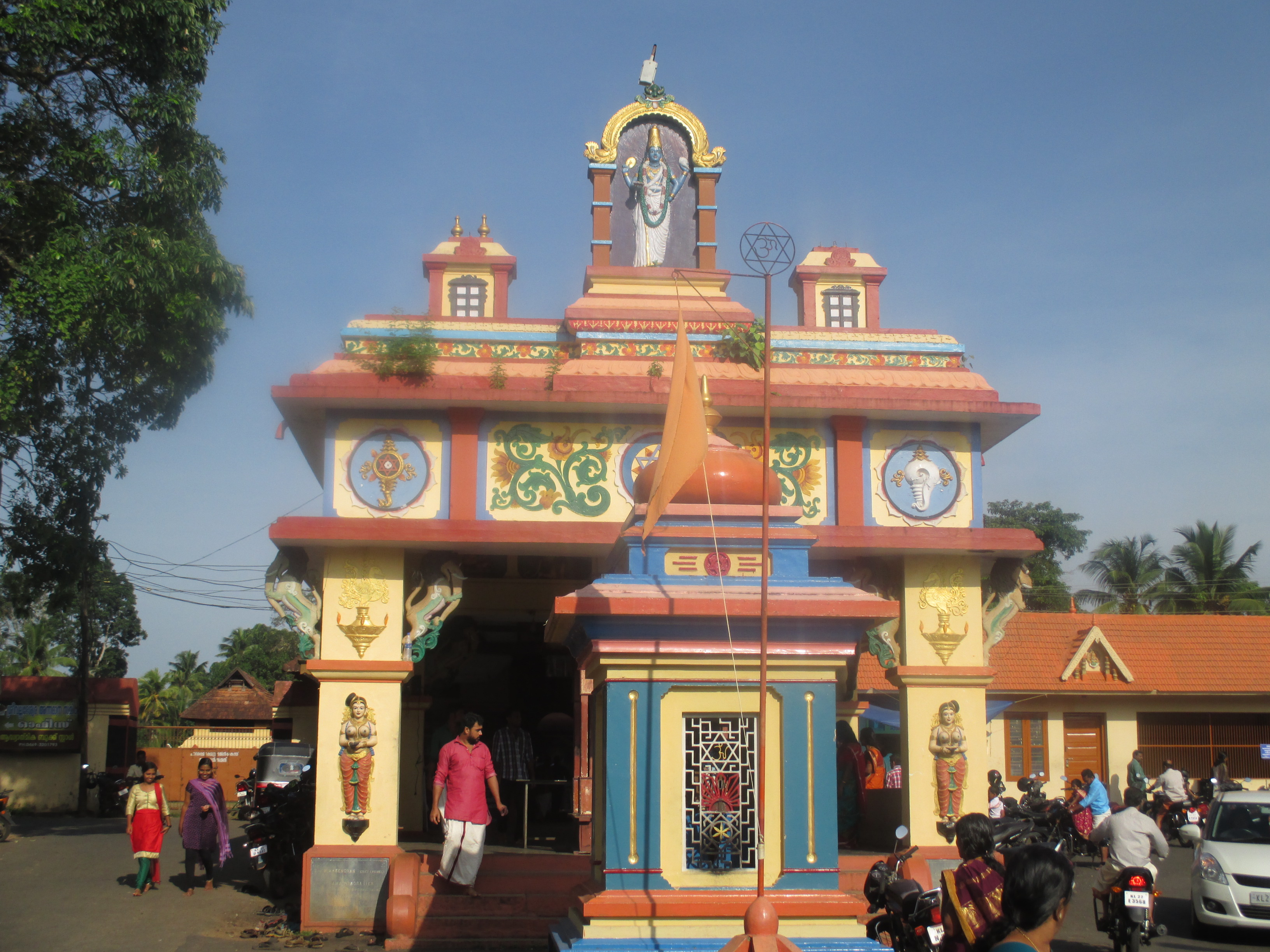

- Sreevallabha Temple, Thiruvalla, Pathanamthitta

Religion
- Affiliation: Hinduism
- District: Pathanamthitta
- Deity: Sreevallabhan, Sudarshanamoorthy, Kolapiran, ThiruVaazhmarban; Thayar: Selvathirukozhunthu Nachiyar, Vaatsalya Devi; Prathyaksham: Khandakarnan; Mangalasaashanam: Thirumangai Azhwar, Namm Azhwar; Theertham: Khandakarna Theertham, Pamba nadhi
- Festival: Uthra Sree Bali
- Features: Tower: Chaturanga Kola Vimanam; Temple tank: Jalavanthi Theertham

Location
- Location: Thiruvalla
- State: Kerala
- Country: India
- Coordinates: 9°22′25″N 76°33′45″E

Architecture
- Type: Kerala style

Specifications
- Direction of façade: Sreevallabhan & Sudarshanamoorthy standing; Sreevallabhan facing east, and Sudarshanamoorthy facing west
- Temple: One
- Elevation: 29.02 m (95 ft)

Website
- www.srivallabhatemple.org

The Sreevallabha Temple is an orthodox Hindu temple dedicated to Sreevallabha (Vallabha meaning consort of Sree or Lakshmi), a form of Vishnu. It is located in Thiruvalla, Pathanamthitta district, Kerala state.

== Description ==
One of the oldest and largest temples in Kerala and one of the 108 Divya Desams, it has been valued by the Alvars and reportedly mentioned in the Garuda and Matsya Puranas.

According to legend, Vishnu appeared here as Sreevallabha for the sage Durvasa and Khandakarnan. Pleased by the prayers of an old Brahmin woman, Sreevallabha incarnated as a Brahmachari and killed the demon Thokalaasuran. The deity of Sreevallabha, worshipped by Lakshmi and Krishna, was installed in the temple in 59 BC. Durvasa and Saptarishi are said to go to the temple every midnight.

It is known for its architecture and unique customs, and Kathakali is performed daily. The temple contributed to the cultural and educational development of Kerala.

== Access ==
The temple is 750 meters south of the Ramapuram vegetable market and 500 metres south of the Kavumbhagom junction on the Thiruvalla–Ambalappuzha state highway (SH-12). It is 2.5 km from the Thiruvalla railway station and 2 km from the KSRTC bus stand. KSRTC, private bus service, and auto-taxi service is available.

== Administration ==
The temple, administered by the Travancore Devaswom Board, is a major temple in the Thiruvalla group.

== History ==
Present-day Thiruvalla was one of 64 Namboothiri villages in Kerala, and is one of India's oldest settlements. Located at the mouth of the Manimala River, it was known as Vallavai. According to another theory, it was named after the Sreevallabha Temple in colloquial Malayalam. It was a spiritual and educational centre by 1100 CE, and had a Vedic school with about 1,500 students and 150 teachers. The Vedas, Vedanta, Tarka Shastra, Mimamsa, jyotisha, ayurveda, and Kalaripayattu were taught. The temple had an ayurvedic hospital with facilities to treat 100 patients at a time. Nammalvar and Thirumangai Alvar praised the temple, and the Sanskrit poet Daṇḍin mentioned it in his works. Malayalam's earliest prose is the Thiruvalla inscriptions, dating to the first half of the 12th century CE, which was obtained from the temple in 1915. The 13th-century Unnuneeli Sandesam highlighted the temple.

It had 15 major priests and 180 subordinate priests. The temple acquired wealth, and served food in golden banana leaves. In 1752-1753, Marthanda Varma of Travancore captured the temple from Pathillathil Pottimar.

== Architecture ==
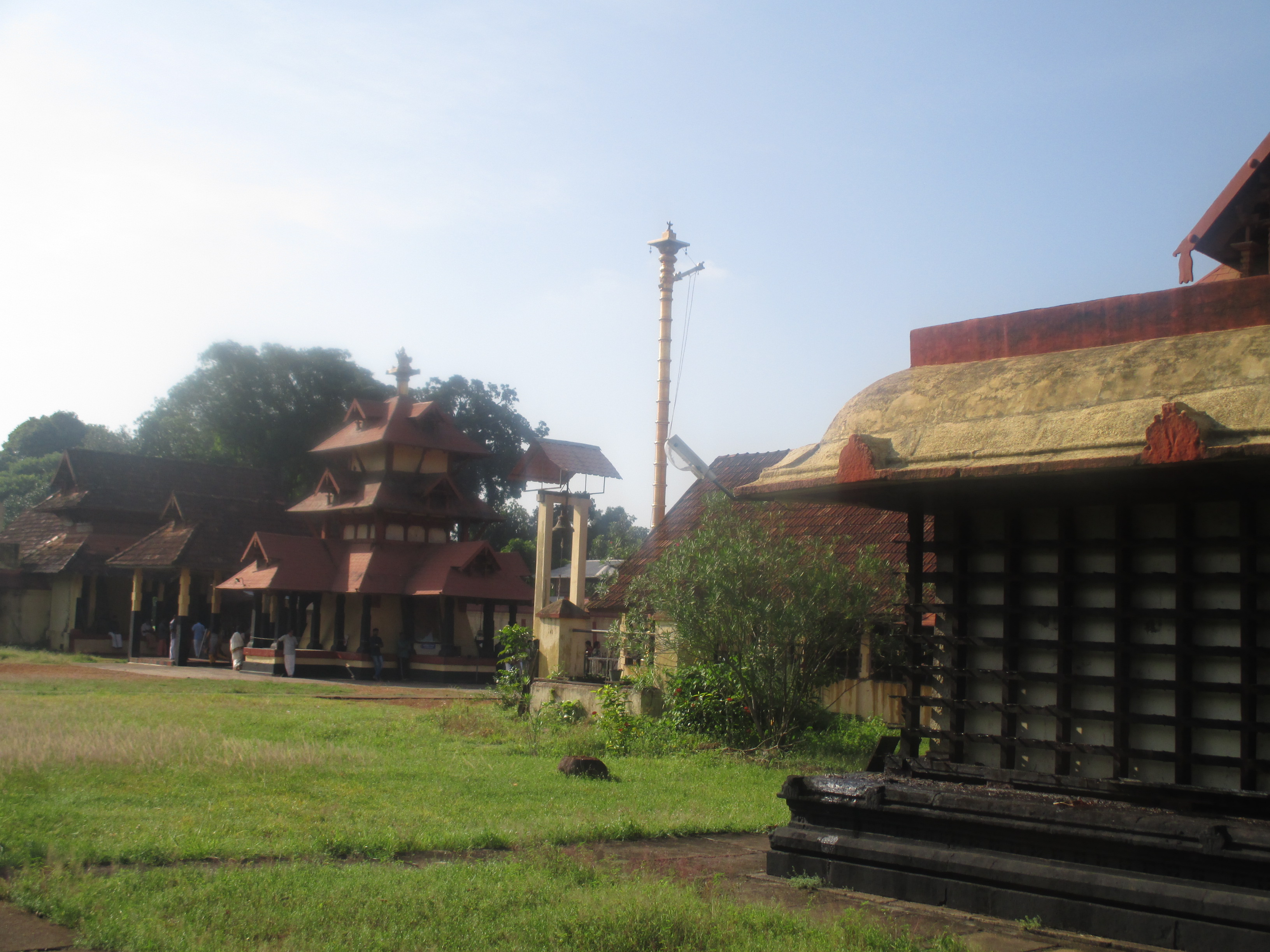
The Garuda mandapa and the main shrine

Built on the Manimala River, the temple covers 8.5 acres – the largest area of any Travancore temple. It is surrounded by a 12-foot-tall, 566-foot-long, 4.5-foot-thick red-granite walls with a two-story gopuram (entrance tower) on each side. The wall was built in 57 BC. Outside the east wall, a 1.5-acre pond has a copper flagstaff on its south bank. A platform for performing Kathakali is in front of the east entrance. Inside the wall is a walking path. A dining hall is on the south-east; this is unique among other temples, whose dining halls are on the north side. The temple auditorium and administrative offices are next to it. Smaller shrines for Ganapathy and Ayyappan and another auditorium are on the south-west side. The temple guard, on the north side of other temples, is on the south side. The sacred fig and mango trees beneath which Durvasa meditated are near the Ayyappan shrine. The Sankaramangalth Illam, where Lalithambika Antharjanam lived, is outside the west tower. The north gopuram is only opened for Uthra Sreebali festival. A spring-fed pond, used by priests, is on the north-east. Vedavyasa and Durvasa disappeared from its east bank, and a building for priests is on the south side. North of the temple is an open-air shrine. The temple stage was destroyed by fire in 1915.

The Garuda flagstaff, made of black granite, stands 53.5 feet high and was built in 57 BC; its lower end reaches the water table. The flagstaff, topped by a three-foot statue of Garuda which faces the temple, has begun leaning and is surrounded by a three-tier edifice for support. A golden flagstaff is west of it.

West of the third flagstaff is a two-story, copper-roofed building supported by 16 stone pillars which contains a ten-foot-high altar (main sacrificial stone). The pillars and roof are known for their carvings, and the building's western part has murals and a small shrine. Its central corridor leads to a 150-foot-long, 11-foot-wide building made of black stones and supported by 54 stone pillars with a salabhanjika carved on each.

The round, copper-roofed, golden-domed sreekovil is decorated with etched murals of Matsya, Kurma, Dakshinamurthy, Varaha, Ganapathy, Narasimha, Vamana, sudarshana, Parashurama, Rama, Purusha sukta, Balarama, Krishna, Lakshmi, Kalki and Garuda. The sreekovil has an outer circumference of 160 feet and three concentric walls. Sreevallabha has a lotus in his right hand and the Sudarshana Chakra is in his right upper hand; his left hand is on his waist. The seven-foot-tall statue is at a height of 10 feet.

== Legends ==
=== Khandakarnan and his bells ===
Despite being the son of Shiva, Khandakarnan was a demon who sacrificed animals to please his father and never missed a chance to humiliate Vishnu. He had a pair of bells as earrings, so he could only hear the name of Shiva (which he chanted continuously). When Khandakarnan did not obtain salvation, he asked Shiva why. Since the power of Shiva and Vishnu are the same, Shiva advised him to worship Vishnu. Directed by Durvasa, Khandakarnan reached the jasmine forest. He bathed in the Jalavanthy pond, and the holy water cleansed him of his wrongdoings. Khandakarnan threw away his Shaiva earrings, and got a pair of Vaishnava earrings so he could only hear the name of Vishnu. During the Dvapara Yuga, Vishnu appeared to him and he was liberated.

=== Journey of Sreevallabhan’s idol ===
Soon after the construction of Dvaraka, Sagara gave many precious things (including the Sreevallabhan idol) to Krishna. Krishna gave it to his friend, Satyaki, saying: "There is nothing better in the world for the worship of Vishnu than Sreevallabhan's idol. Worshipping Vishnu directly and worshipping this idol is considered the same. It has the power to wash away the sins of all the lifetimes.". Satyaki asked Krishna's permission to build a temple, and the celestial architect Vishvakarma built it in Dvaraka. The sage Vedavyasa installed the idol, and Durvasa taught the priests the worship protocol. During the end of Dvapara Yuga, Satyaki gave the idol to Garuda and asked him to keep it safe for the humans in the Kali Yuga. Garuda went to the island of Ramanaka and worshipped it there; worshipping the idol freed him from his curses. When it was time for Garuda to return to Vaikuntha, he hid the idol in the bed of the Netravati River (in present-day Dakshina Kannada district, Karnataka).

=== The envious Brahmins ===
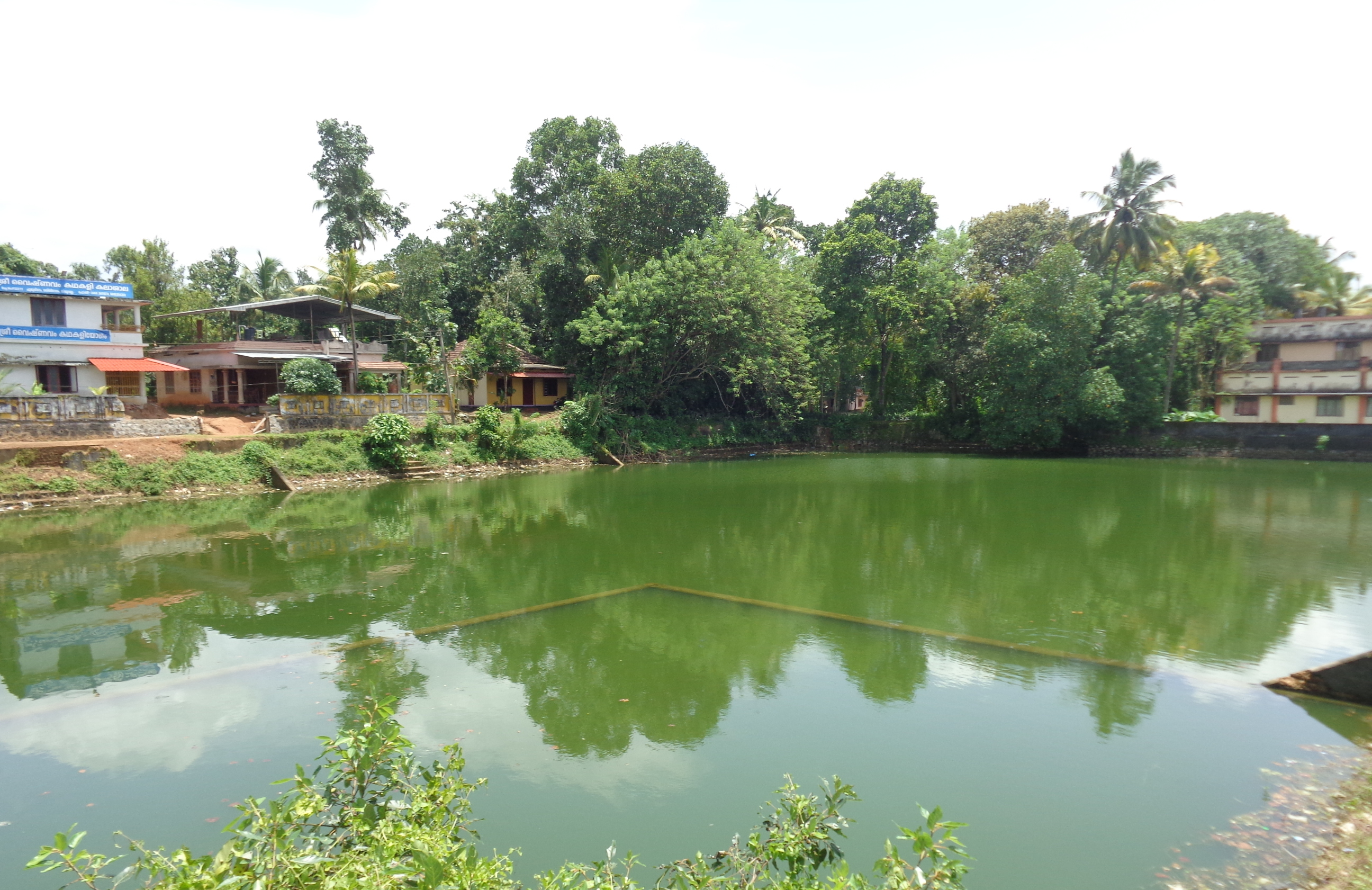
The temple pond

The area around the jasmine forest became a human settlement thousands of years ago as a spiritual and educational center with great wealth and power. There were at least 3,000 Brahmin families, and those from Sankaramangalath House had the highest status. The house was at risk of extinction because only an old woman and her younger son, Narayana Bhattathiri, lived there. Narayana married Sreedevi Antharjanam against the wishes of those who wanted his wealth by marrying their daughters to him. Sreedevi Antherjanam was illiterate; literacy was mandatory for Brahmins and women were well-versed in Sanskrit, and Antharjanam ignored their ridicule. The couple began fasting on Ekadashi (the 11th day of the month), which is auspicious for Vishnu. Antharjanam abstained from food and sleep, and made her servant and her son, Mukundan, do likewise.

=== Antharjanam's humiliation and the Ekadashi miracle ===
Bhattathiri died, and Antherjanam was widowed. A devotee of Vishnu, she was troubled because she could not read a panchangam (astrological calendar) to recognize Ekadshi and her illiteracy would be further ridiculed. Antherjanam learned the Ekadashi day, and she placed a pebble in a pot each day to know when 15 days had passed. The actual Ekadashi was often a day earlier or later, though, due to the change in the appearance of the moon. This brought on more ridicule, but two astrologers confirmed the day as Ekadashi at the Sankaramangalath House and Dashami (the 10th day) everywhere else.

=== Thukalasuran and Yakshi ===
Mallikavanam was attacked by Thukalasuran, a demon called who robbed and was fond of eating young human flesh. A yakshini reached the western road to the village, attacking everyone who came in her way. Many people left Mallikavanam, which was restricted to visitors. The aged Antharjanam could not leave, and it became difficult to find a Brahmin boy to continue her religious duties. She wept in front of her Vishnu idol, asking to maintain the custom that she had been following for many years. A young Brahmin boy with a gold pole in his hand asked for food. Antharjanam was glad to see him, and asked him to come after his bath since she needed to complete the Ekadashi rituals. Disregarding her warnings, the young man approached the river where Thukalasuran lived. He and Thukalasuran fought; the golden pole turned into the Sudarshana Chakra, and he killed Thukalasuran and destroyed his army. The young man washed the blood off in the river, tied the hands of the yakshini, and threw her into a well where she died. The boy installed a Durga idol and asked the goddess to protect the town; she appeared in three area temples.

=== Installation of the Sudarshana Chakra ===
The boy and five others later reached the Sankaramangalath House. Antharjanam completed the rituals and served food to them in areca nut leaves, since the rakshasa had destroyed all the banana plantations. She did not have pickles, and pickles were a customary food for Brahmins; Lakshmi, disguised as a housewife, served thrippuli (a kind of pickle) to the boy. Knowing that Thukalasuran had been killed by the boy, people came to visit and asked him to show them his golden pole to venerate. The boy installed the pole, facing west, on raised land east of them. Antharjanam decided to build a temple there, and asked Pathillathil Pottimar to be the administrator. The boy removed his shawl, exposing his chest with the Srivatsa mark and Lakshmi; Vishnu showed his universal form (Vishwarupa) to her family. Antharjanam, her servant and her servant's son obtained salvation by merging with him. This happened in 2998 BC; the five boys who accompanied Vishnu were the sage Durvasa and his disciples. The Sankaramangalath House is preserved outside the temple, near its western gate, and is considered the original temple.

=== Installation of Sreevallabhan’s idol ===
About 3,000 years after this, King Cheraman Perumal visited the temple. His wife, Queen Cherumdevi, wanted to build a shrine for Vishnu attached to the Sudarshana shrine. They ordered a Vishnu idol from Tamil Nadu after the temple was rebuilt. The queen dreamed that Garuda, disguised as a Brahmin, told her about Sreevallabhan's idol and asked to install it there. With the help of Garuda and the Tulu Brahmins, Cheraman Perumal brought the idol from the Netravathi River to Chakrapuram for installation. During the installation ceremony, the idol did not fit on the pedestal and the priests went outside. They heard celestial instruments being played and the chanting of vedic hymns from inside. They saw the idol installed in the right place, with blazing light and bananas in an Areca nut palm leaf in front of it. Durvasa and Vyasa came out of the sanctum-sanctorum and disappeared on the eastern bank of the Jalavanthy. Sreevallabha Temple had been built by Uliyannoor Perumthachan, and the temple wall and flagstaff were completed in one day in 57 BC.

=== Ban of women ===
After a woman received salvation in the shrine, women were more attracted to the temple. A woman who was enchanted by the handsome idol entered the sanctum sanctorum to marry Vishnu, and the administrators decided to ban women from entering the temple after astrological counseling. On request, they agreed to allow women twice a year on the Arudra Darshanam day of the month of Dhanu and the Vishu-festival day in the month of Medam. The ban was lifted in 1968.

=== Vilwamangalam and Nammalvar ===
One early morning, Vilwamangalam Swamiyar visited the temple while a dance troupe was performing kathakali. Swamiyar was astonished at not feeling the presence of the deity. As he reached the outer enclosure, he saw a young Brahmin man watching the dance and recognised him as Vishnu. Vishnu disappeared into the temple, saying that Swamiyar disturbed his enjoyment of his favourite dance. Thereafter, Kathakali was performed regularly in the temple. The Vaishnavite saint Nammalvar had visited the temple in the evening and fell asleep. He dreamed that Vishnu appeared as Padmanabha, sleeping in the ocean of milk; the infant Krishna with the universe in his mouth; and Vamana, who asked for three long strides of land from the asura king Mahabali.

== Worship customs ==
At Sreevallabha Temple, Vishnu is worshipped in his cosmic, original and transcendental form (purusha). In the sanctum sanctorum, the top and bottom of the deity cannot be seen because purusha has no beginning or end. Clothing the deity in white or saffron suggests the eternity of purusha. Sreevallabha Temple follows the unique Pancharaathra Vidhaanam school of worship, which has been unchanged since 59 BC.

=== Pancharaathra Vidhaanam ===
Pancharaathra Vidhaanam originated in 4 BC. Durvasa Samhitha (based on Pancharaathra Vidhaanam) by the sage Durvasa explains the rituals performed. The book Yajanavali is followed for worshipping Vishnu Five unique pujas are performed, when the deity is adorned like Brahmachari, Grihastha and Sanyasi in several forms.

=== Pujas ===
Five pujas are performed daily. The deity is awakened and bathed with holy water. This is followed by a naivedyam (offering). The idol is then dressed like a brahmachari in an 18-foot-long white mundu with two flower garlands. After the main offering, the deity is dressed in a saffron-yellow mundu with a garland. At noon, the deity is worshipped as a grihastha (householder). In the fifth (evening) puja, the deity is worshipped as Parabrahma and dressed in a saffron-coloured mundu with a tulasi garland. After the sleeping ceremony, the sanctum sanctorum is closed.

=== Temple customs ===
Sreevallabha Temple is known for its orthodox customs. Poet and high priest Vishnunarayanan Namboothiri was temporarily removed from his post in 1997 after he crossed the sea to address the Millennium Conference on Integration on Science and Consciousness in Britain, violating temple customs. The chief priest should be 50 years old and married. Every three years, priests can be changed. Devotees should never use sacred ash (vibhuti) inside the temple wall.

=== Ritual walk ===
Four clockwise circumambulations (Parikramas) are advised in the temple: one outside and three inside. Enter through the east gate, turn left and worship Ganapathy, Shiva and Ayyappan on the southern side. After circumambulating the sacred-fig and mango trees, proceed to Sankaramangalath Illam outside the western gate. Return to the temple and take the northern circumambulation path. Salute Kali at the northern gate. Visit Jalavanthy and salute Vedavyasa and Durvasa on its east bank. Turn right and worship Garuda before entering the temple. In the sanctum, worship Sreevallabha, Lakshmi, Bhudevi, Varaha and Dakshinamurthy through the eastern door and Sudarshana Chakra through the western door.

== Festivals ==
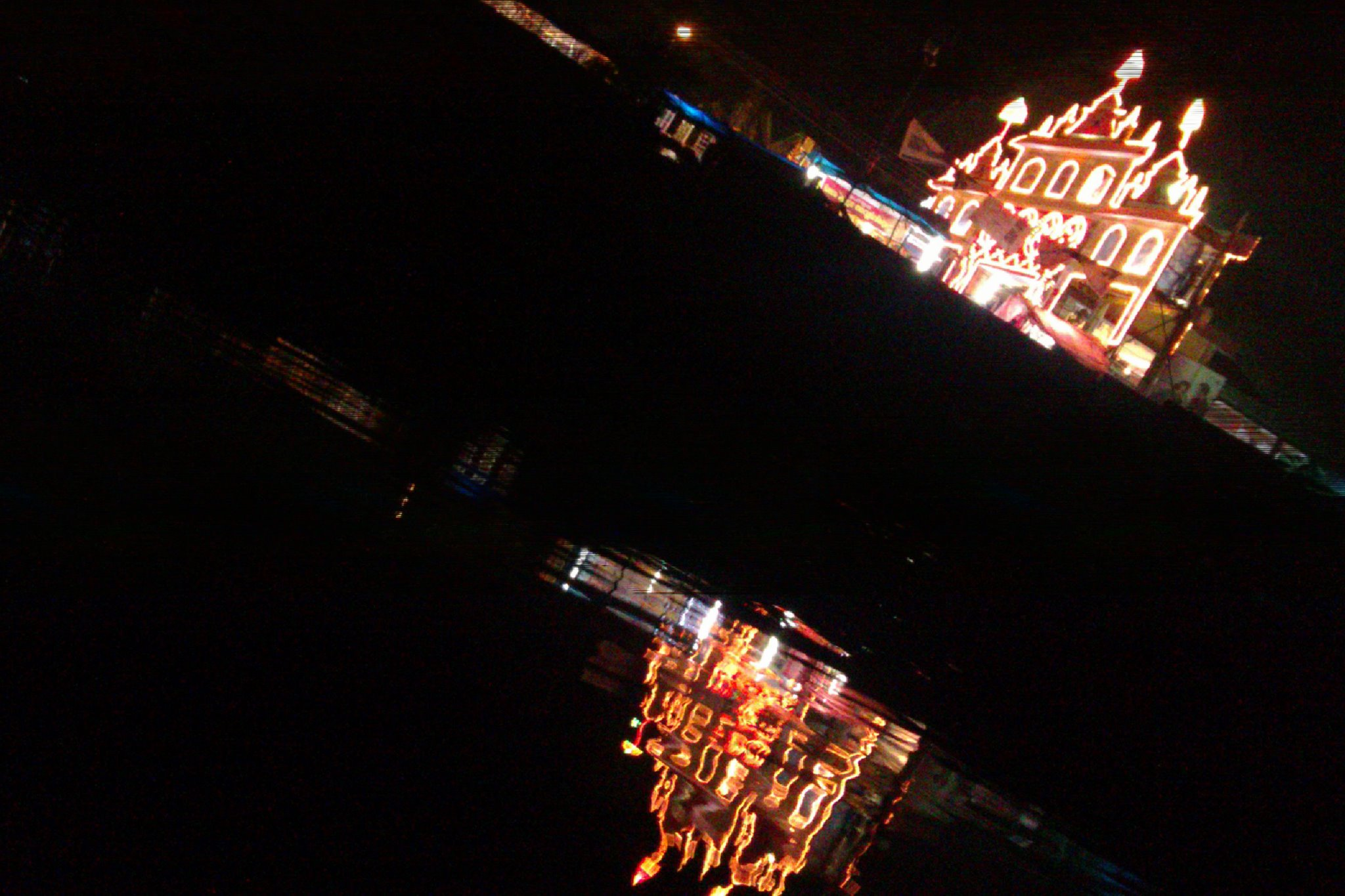
The temple during an uthsavam

The temple observes two major festivals. One, for ten days, is celebrated in the month of kumbham in the Malayalam calendar (February–March). Uthra Sreebali, the temple's largest festival, is celebrated in the Malayalam month of minam (March–April). It is the festival of three goddesses. Before their holy bath on the eighth day, the goddesses proceed to Sreevallabha Temple. Ashtapadi hymns are played, followed by dancing among lamps. Other festivals are Vishu (mid-April) and during the months of kaṟkkaṭakam (July–August), cinnam (August–September), tulam (October–November), vr̥ścikam (November–December) and Dhanu (December–January).

== Schedule ==
The temple operates from 4 a.m. to noon and 5:00 to 8:00 p.m. Timings of major events are as follows. At 4 a.m. the deity is awakened. The deity is viewed at 4:30, and bathed at 5:00 a.m. The first puja is at 6:30, and the first outside procession (sreebali) is at 8:00. The second puja is at 9:00, followed by a third at 10:45 a.m. Another procession is at 11:30, before the temple closes at noon.

It reopens at 5:00 p.m. There is a fourth puja at 7:00, and a fifth at 7:30. The third and final procession is at 8:00, before the temple closes.

== Offerings ==
The four main daily offerings are Paala Namaskaaram, Kathakali, Pantheerayiram and the Kesadipaadam garland. The popular Paala Namaskaaram, part of the third puja, is the serving of food to the deity and the Brahmins in areca nut palm leaves. Kathakali is performed each evening. Pantheerayiram is the offering of 12,001 bananas in a special ritual, usually made at the Pantheeradi (second) puja. The Kesaadipaadam garland is a flower garland, measuring about 15 feet, which adorns the deity during the third and fourth pujas. Other offerings are made during specific pujas.

== See also ==
- List of Hindu temples in Kerala
- Pathanamthitta district
- Thiruvalla
