= Payyanur Assembly constituency =

Constituency of the Kerala legislative assembly in India

Payyanur
- Constituency No. 6 for the Kerala Legislative Assembly
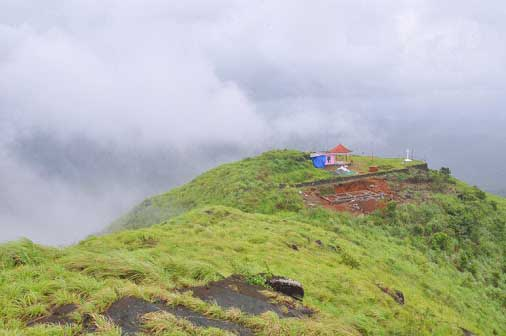
- Kottathalachi Mount, Cherupuzha

Constituency details
- Country: India
- Region: South India
- State: Kerala
- District: Kannur
- Established: 1957
- Total electors: 188,935 (2026)
- Reservation: None

Member of Legislative Assembly
- 16th Kerala Legislative Assembly
- Incumbent V. Kunhikrishnan
- Party: Independent Politician
- Alliance: UDF
- Elected year: 2026

Payyanur State assembly constituency is one of the 140 state legislative assembly constituencies in Kerala in southern India. It is also one of the seven state legislative assembly constituencies included in Kasaragod Lok Sabha constituency. As of the 2026 Assembly elections, the current MLA is V. Kunhikrishnan, an independent candidate contested for UDF party.

== Local self-governed segments ==
Payyanur Assembly constituency is composed of the following local self-governed segments:

Sl no.	Name	Status (Grama panchayat/Municipality)	Taluk
1	Payyanur	Municipality	Payyanur
2	Cherupuzha	Grama panchayat	Payyanur
3	Eramam-Kuttur	Grama panchayat	Payyanur
4	Kankole-Alapadamba	Grama panchayat	Payyanur
5	Karivellur-Peralam	Grama panchayat	Payyanur
6	Peringome-Vayakkara	Grama panchayat	Payyanur
7	Ramanthali	Grama panchayat	Payyanur

== Members of the Legislative Assembly ==
Year	Member	Political party
1967	A. V. Kunjambu	Communist Party of India (Marxist)
1970	A. V. Kunjambu	Communist Party of India (Marxist)
1977	N. Subrammaniya Shenoy	Communist Party of India (Marxist)
1980	N. Subrammaniya Shenoy	Communist Party of India (Marxist)
1982	M. V. Raghavan	Communist Party of India (Marxist)
1987	C. P. Narayanan	Communist Party of India (Marxist)
1991	C. P. Narayanan	Communist Party of India (Marxist)
1996	Pinarayi Vijayan	Communist Party of India (Marxist)
2001	P. K. Sreemathy	Communist Party of India (Marxist)
2006	P. K. Sreemathy	Communist Party of India (Marxist)
2011	C. Krishnan	Communist Party of India (Marxist)
2016	C. Krishnan	Communist Party of India (Marxist)
2021	T. I. Madhusoodanan	Communist Party of India (Marxist)
2026	V. Kunhikrishnan (Note: Supported by United Democratic Front)	Independent politician

== Election results ==
=== 2026 ===
There were 188,935 registered voters in the Payyanur constituency for the 2026 Kerala Assembly election.

2026 Kerala Legislative Assembly election: Payyanur
Party	Candidate	Votes	%	±%
Independent	V. Kunhikrishnan	76,640	49.14	▲19.85
CPI(M)	T. I. Madhusoodanan	69,153	44.34	▼18.15
BJP	A. P. Gangadharan	8,432	5.41	▼2.13
NOTA	None of the above	1,193	0.76	▲0.30
Independent	Sandeep V. K.	552	0.35	
Margin of victory		7,487	4.80	▼28.40
Turnout		1,55,970	81.90	▼1.19
UDF gain from CPI(M)		Swing	▲19.85	

By Local body Segments
No.	Status (Local body)	Votes			Lead
No.	Status (Local body)	V. Kunhikrishnan	T. I. Madhusoodanan	A. P. Gangadharan	Lead
1	Karivellur-Peralam	8,616	14,366	1,397	5,750
2	Kankole-Alapadamba	2,320	2,907	277	587
3	Peringome-Vayakkara	9,964	9,136	1,236	828
4	Payyannur Municipality	28,902	19,509	2,155	9,393
5	Ramanthali	6,390	4,569	742	1,821
6	Eramam-Kuttoor	9,871	8,273	1,017	1,598
7	Cherupuzha	10,609	6,719	1,380	3,890

=== 2021 ===
There were 1,80,460 registered voters in the constituency for the 2021 election.

2021 Kerala Legislative Assembly election: Payyanur
Party	Candidate	Votes	%	±%
CPI(M)	T. I. Madhusoodanan	93,695	62.49	▲4.47
INC	M Pradeep Kumar	43,915	29.29	▼0.66
BJP	Adv K K Sreedharan	11,308	7.54	▼3.15
NOTA	None of the above	686	0.46	▼0.27
Independent	Abhilash KV	341	0.23	
Margin of victory		49,780	33.2	▲5.13
Turnout		1,49,945	83.09	▲1.33
CPI(M) hold		Swing	▲4.47	

=== 2016 ===
There were 1,75,438 registered voters in the constituency for the 2016 election.

2016 Kerala Legislative Assembly election: Payyanur
Party	Candidate	Votes	%	±%
CPI(M)	C. Krishnan	83,226	58.02	▼1.73
INC	Sajid Mavval	42,963	29.95	▼5.25
BJP	Aniamma	15,341	10.69	▲6.85
NOTA	None of the above	1,042	0.73	−
CPI(M)	Vinod Kumar Ramanthali	870	0.61	−
Margin of victory		40,263	28.07	▲4.44
Turnout		1,43,442	81.76	▲2.43
CPI(M) hold		Swing	▼1.73	

=== 2011 ===
There were 1,58,613 registered voters in the constituency for the 2011 election.

2011 Kerala Legislative Assembly election: Payyanur
Party	Candidate	Votes	%	±%
CPI(M)	C. Krishnan	78,116	59.78	
INC	K. Brijesh Kumar	45,992	35.20	
BJP	C. K. Ramesan	5,019	3.84	
BSP	Geetha	625	0.48	
Independent	T. Padmanabhan	636	0.41	
SS	Kottayodi Vishwanathan	378	0.29	
Margin of victory		32,124	23.98	
Turnout		1,24,854	79.33	
CPI(M) hold		Swing		

=== 1952 ===
1952 Madras Legislative Assembly election: Payyanur
Party	Candidate	Votes	%	±%
CPI	K. P. Gopalan	32,360	67.66	
INC	Vivekananda Devappa Sernoy	10,126	21.17	
Socialist	C. M. Kesavan	4,095	8.56	
Independent	Uma Maheswaran	1,245	2.60	
Margin of victory		22,234	46.49	
Turnout		47,826	66.37	
Registered electors		72,055		
CPI win (new seat)				

== See also ==
- Payyanur
- Kannur district
- List of constituencies of the Kerala Legislative Assembly
- 2016 Kerala Legislative Assembly election
