= Kuniyan River =

River in Kerala, India

Kuniyan River, also known as Kuniyan stream, is a river which flows along the border of Kannur and Kasaragod districts in the Indian state of Kerala. It connects the Kariangode River and the Olavara River which join the Kavvayi Backwaters.

== Drainage ==
It touches Payyannur, Karivellur, Eyyakadu and Trikarpur. It flows through Trikarpur Panchayath, Karivellur-Peralam Panchayath, Payyanur Municipality and Kayyur-Cheemeni Panchayat.
