= Kavvayi River =

River in India

The Kavvayi River basin is located between 120 05’ to 120 15’ North latitude and 750 05 ‘ to 750 20’ East longitude. It spreads over the district of Kannur and Kasargod.

It has a total area of 164.76 km2, covering 14 villages spread over nine local bodies in the two districts. Kavvayi River or Thattar River emerges from the Cheemeni Kunnu at an elevation of 114 m. above MSL, having a length of 31 km and joining directly to Kavvai backwater. Kavvayi River is typical among the 14 midland-originated rivers in Kerala. It has a watershed area confined to midland hillocks and their valley.

Kavvayi River includes five rivers, the Kavvayi River, and its tributaries Kankol, Vannathichal, Kuppithodu, and Kuniyan, which flow together to form the Kavvayi Backwaters. The four Kanams, namely Kanayi, Vannathi, Easwaran, and Vattappoyil, in the Kavvayi River Basin, were documented by researchers and have 452 plant species.
