= Ramanthali (disambiguation) =

Ramanthali may refer to:

- Ramanthali
- Ramanthali inscriptions
- Sudhakaran Ramanthali
