= V. Kunhikrishnan =

Indian politician

Member of the Kerala Legislative Assembly
- Incumbent
- Assumed office May 2026
- Preceded by: T. I. Madhusoodanan
- Constituency: Payyanur

Personal details
- Born: 1952 (age 73–74) Payyanur, Kerala, India
- Party: Independent
- Parent: Kammara Poduval (father)

V. Kunhikrishnan (born 1952) is an Indian politician from Kerala. He is a Member of the Legislative Assembly from Payyanur Assembly constituency in Kannur district. He won as an independent candidate and made history by winning in a constituency where the Communist Party of India (Marxist) was undefeated for more than 60 years.

== Early life and education ==
Kunhikrishnan is from Payyanur in Kannur district, Kerala. He is the son of Kammara Poduval. He completed his schooling at Government High School, Karivellur, passing the SSLC examination in March 1970. In 1976, he earned a Junior Diploma from the Co-operative Training Centre, Kozhikode. A retired employee, he declared assets worth ₹4 crore in his affidavit to the Election Commission of India.

== Career ==
Contesting as an independent candidate supported by the UDF after breaking away from the CPI(M), he won the 2026 Kerala Legislative Assembly election from the Payyanur Assembly constituency. He polled 76,640 votes and defeated his nearest rival and sitting MLA T. I. Madhusoodanan of the CPI(M) by a margin of 7,487 votes. His victory marked the first time a CPI(M) candidate had been defeated in the Payyanur constituency in over 60 years.
