= Valiyaparamba =

Coastal island in Hosdurg taluk, India

Coordinates: 12.144443°N 75.144323°E

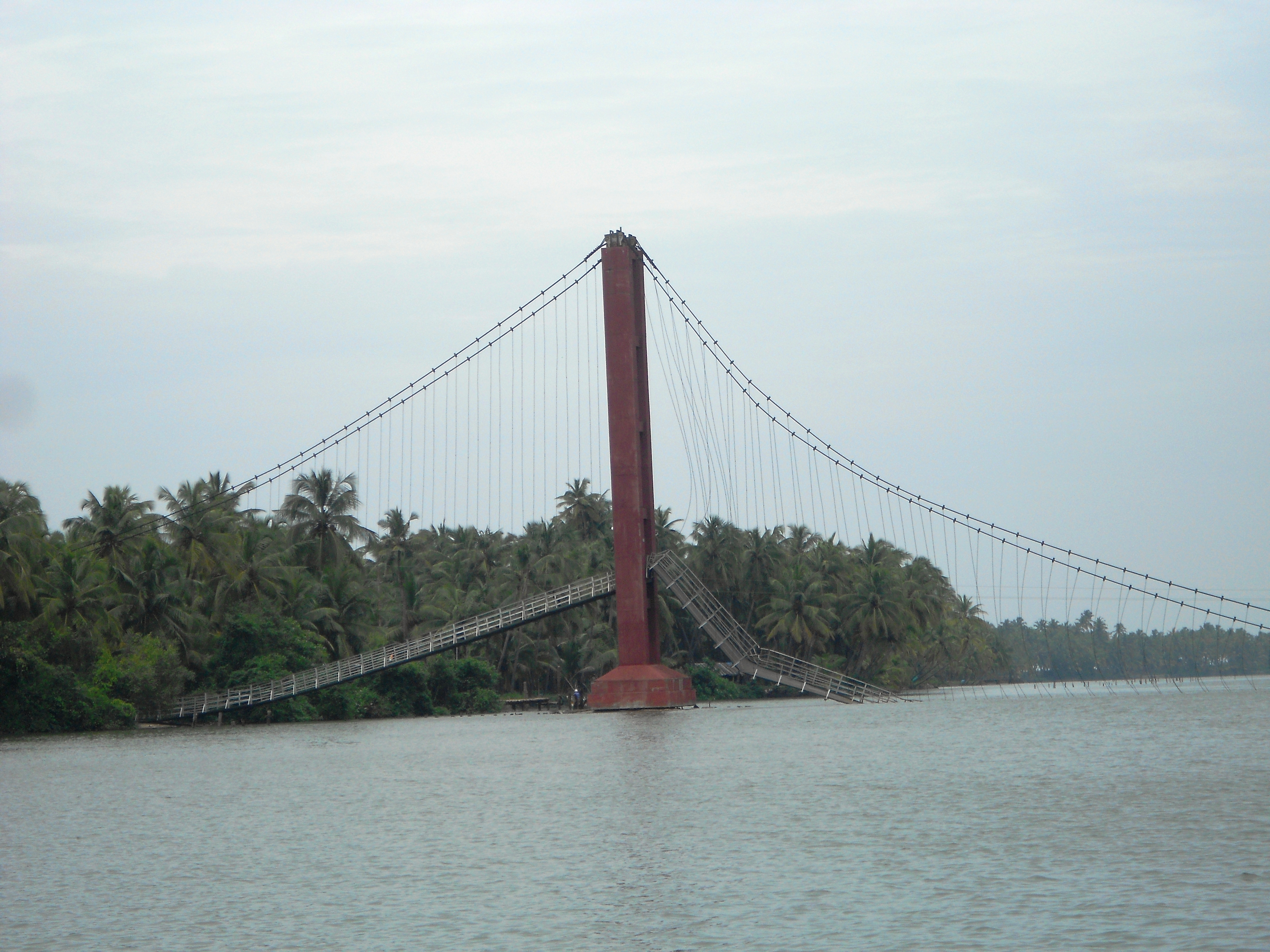
Collapsed suspension bridge to Valiyaparamba from Madakkal Island.

Valiyaparamba Beach sun set

Valiyaparamba (Malayalam: വലിയപറമ്പ) is a coastal island in Hosdurg taluk, Kasaragod district, Kerala state, India.

== Location ==
Valiyaparamba is one of the fastest growing tourism destination and longest island of Kerala. Island is separated from the mainland by Kavvayi Backwater. It is located five kilometres (3.1 mi) southwest of Cheruvathur and about 30 kilometres (19 mi) from Bekal, Kasaragod, north Kerala. The island is approximately 16.14 square kilometres (6.23 sq mi) in size, and had a population of 11,917 in 1991. The island's main source of income is from Tourii, agriculture and fishing. The island has 13 wards ruling by each ward member to leading the Valiyaparamba Panchayat.

== Geography ==
Valiyaparamba is fed by four rivers and dotted with numerous little islands. Valiyaparamba, a hinterland separated from the mainland, is a noted fishing centre in the district. A Bekal Fort stands on a headland that runs into the sea. A National Waterway passes through the island.

== Education ==
The island has seven primary schools and one higher secondary school.

== Transportation ==
The island is separated from the mainland and accessible by crossing the Mavila Kadappuram bridge on the north end of the island or Valiyaparamba edayilekad Bridge on the south.

- Nearest railway station: Trikarpurzhikode-Mangalore route, about 5 km (3 mi) from Valiyaparamba.
- National Highway (NH 17) passes through Cheruvathur.
- Nearest airports: Kannur International Airport in Keralaa State, about 64 km (40 mi); Mangalore in Karnataka State, about 100 km (62 mi); Karipur International Airport Kozhikode, about 150 km (93 mi) from Valiyaparamba.

== See also ==
- Payyannur
- Peringome 20 km from Payyanur
- Ezhimala 12 km from Payyanur Town
- Kunhimangalam village 8 km from Payyanur town
- Kavvayi Island 3 km from Payyanur
- Ramanthali 7 km from Payyanur
- Karivellur 10 km from Payyanur
- Trikarpur 6 km from Payyanur
- Padne
- Cheruvathur
