= Sakina's Kiss =

Novel by Vivek Shanbhag

- Author: Vivek Shanbhag
- Translator: Srinath Perur
- Language: Kannada
- Genre: Novel
- Publisher: Vintage Books India; Faber and Faber (UK); McNally Editions (US)
- Publication date: 2023 (English translation)
- Publication place: India
- Media type: Print
- Pages: 192

Sakina's Kiss is a novel by the Indian writer Vivek Shanbhag, written in Kannada and translated into English by Srinath Perur. It is narrated by Venkat, a middle-class man in Bengaluru whose ordered life is upended when two strangers come looking for his daughter and she later goes missing, a turn that pulls him back to a long-buried family secret. It is Shanbhag's second novel to appear in English, after Ghachar Ghochar, and was again translated by Perur. The English translation was published in India in 2023 and in the United Kingdom and the United States in 2025. It was shortlisted for the 2026 James Tait Black Prize for fiction.

== Background and publication ==
Sakina's Kiss is Shanbhag's second work of fiction to be translated into English, following the success of Ghachar Ghochar, which appeared in English in 2015. Both novels were translated by Srinath Perur, who has also translated other Kannada works and writes on travel, science and culture. At a launch event for the book, Shanbhag spoke about the process of translation, describing it as a humbling one. He discussed the novel's concerns in an interview with Moneycontrol.

The novel first appeared in Kannada in 2021. Srinath Perur's English translation was published in India by Vintage Books in October 2023, in the United Kingdom by Faber and Faber in May 2025, and in the United States by McNally Editions in July 2025. The McNally edition runs to 192 pages.

== Plot ==
Venkat is a middle-aged, middle-class man in Bengaluru who relies on self-help books for guidance and whose marriage to his wife, Viji, has settled into routine. Their daughter Rekha, aged 20, is an arts student with feminist views and an ambition to become a journalist, and Venkat privately disapproves of her independence. One evening two of Rekha's male college acquaintances come to the apartment looking for her; she is away at Mavinamane, a remote village where Venkat's family owns a plantation and where there is no telephone signal. When older men connected to the two visitors turn up, Venkat suspects he has been drawn into a local feud.

After Rekha goes missing, Venkat and Viji take an overnight bus to Mavinamane to look for her. The plantation is run by Venkat's domineering paternal uncle, Antanna, and the return forces Venkat to confront events he had tried to forget. Central to these is the story of his maternal uncle, Ramana, a political activist who had to disappear after falling foul of the authorities and who sent home letters in handwriting so poor that they were hard to read. The novel's title comes from one such letter: a sentence first read at a family gathering as "I find Sakina's kisses preferable" is later understood to mean that the writer would rather be killed than fall into the hands of the police.

== Themes ==
Reviewers read the novel as a study of power, patriarchy and masculinity in contemporary India, with Venkat presented as an unreliable narrator whose need for control and order keeps him from understanding the people around him. Several reviews linked Venkat's anxieties to wider political shifts, reading the book as a comment on social polarisation and the rise of the Hindu right. Writing for Exchanges: The Iowa Review, Vandana Nair discussed what she called the "unsayable" in Shanbhag's fiction, the material his characters avoid confronting until it surfaces. Miscommunication is a recurring device, from the misread letter that gives the book its title to comic exchanges over language.

== Reception ==
Sakina's Kiss was widely reviewed on its Indian publication. In The Hindu, Keshava Guha called it another success for Shanbhag, a story built around a broken promise that works at the intersection of class, caste, gender and power, and recalled how Ghachar Ghochar had shifted attention towards Indian fiction in translation. Reviewing it for Frontline, N. S. Gundur described Shanbhag as a careful craftsman and drew attention to the novel's criss-crossing structure, in which everyday objects prompt the narrator's memories. In Scroll.in, Sayari Debnath read the book as a study of how outdated ideas of masculinity isolate men from their families, describing Venkat as a coward whose loneliness is largely of his own making while still finding him sympathetic; she wrote that Shanbhag turns middle-class notions of honour on their head and that Perur's translation leaves the novel's silences intact. Writing in the Hindustan Times, Saudamini Jain called it a terrific novel and an intimate portrait of a middle-aged man unsettled by modern life, judged it close to the standard of Ghachar Ghochar, and praised the lightness with which it carried large themes of masculinity, political polarisation and the consequences of Indian liberalisation.

The English editions published abroad were also reviewed. Jane Wallace wrote in the Asian Review of Books that making the narrator a coward was a risk that paid off, and praised the humour and Perur's translation. In Full Stop, Meghna Rao found it less tightly controlled than Ghachar Ghochar but lasting in effect. A reviewer for Kunzum noted the novel's nine-chapter movement between past and present and the way it withholds the meaning of its title until late in the book. The novel was also reviewed by Alex Clark in the Times Literary Supplement and in Firstpost.

== Awards ==
Sakina's Kiss was shortlisted for the 2026 James Tait Black Prize for fiction, the United Kingdom's oldest literary award, in a shortlist announced in March 2026. The fiction prize was awarded to Shady Lewis's On the Greenwich Line in May 2026.
