= V. P. Appukutta Poduval =

Indian freedom fighter, social activist and Gandhian

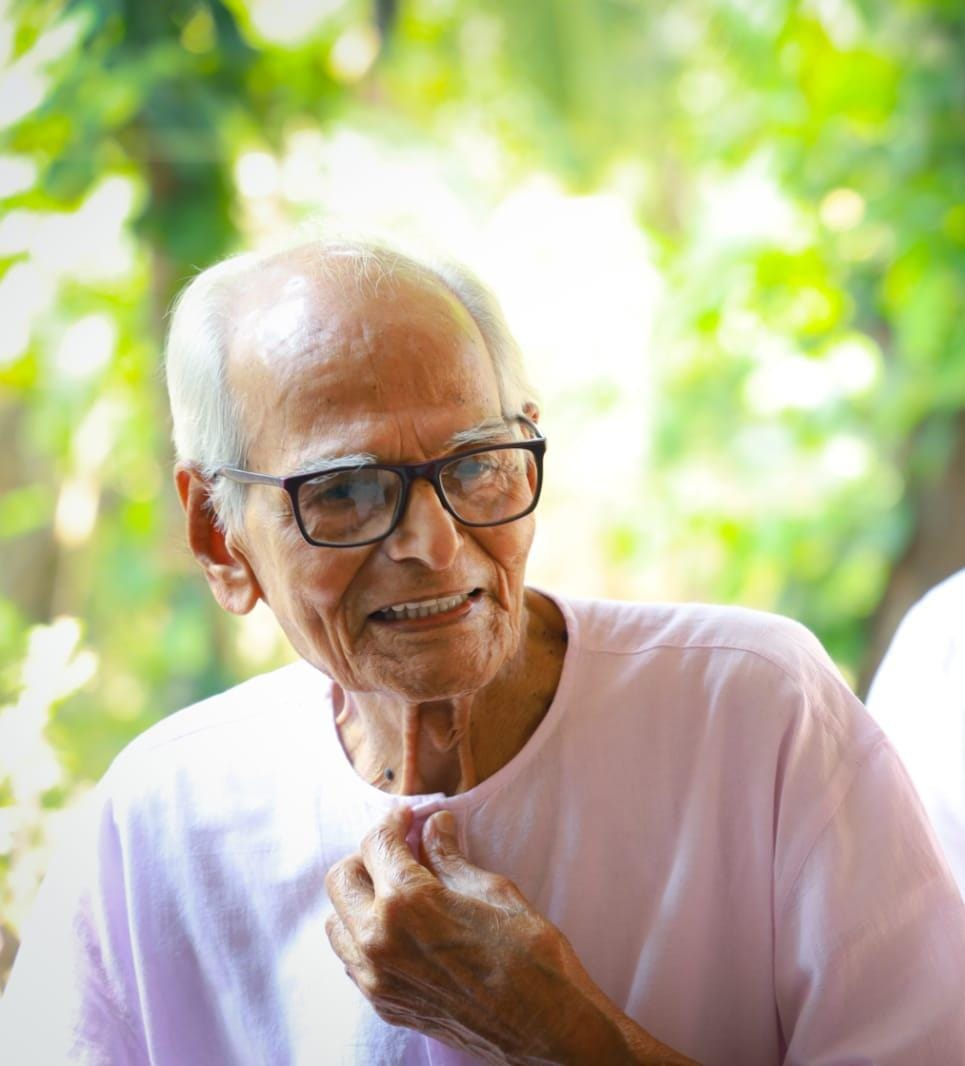
- Born: 9 October 1923 (age 103); Payyanur, Kerala, India
- Education: University of Lucknow; University of Mysore (MA)
- Occupation: Independence activist
- Notable work: Gandhian Darsanathile Adhyatmikata, Bhagavat Gita: Atmavikasathinte Sasthram

V. P. Appukutta Poduval (born 9 October 1923) is an Indian independence activist and Gandhian social activist from Kerala, India. He was awarded Padma Shri by the Government of India in 2023.

== Early life ==
Appukutta Poduval was born in 1923 to Karippath Kammara Poduval and V. P. Subhadramma.

After completing his schooling at Payyanur Sanskrit Padhanasala and the Basel Mission School, Payyanur, V. P. Appukutta Poduval joined the University of Lucknow and later the University of Mysore.

== Career ==
A meeting with Mahatma Gandhi in 1934—during Gandhiji's visit to Payyanur—changed Appukutta Poduval's life for ever. Gandhiji's visit to Payyanur was as per the invitation of Swami Ananda Theertha, a strong voice against untouchability. Poduval was influenced by Swami Ananda Theertha, Raghavji—who was among the 78 who participated in the Salt March with Gandhiji, freedom fighter and poet A. V. Sreekanda Poduval and Appukutta Poduval's uncle V. P. Sreekanda Poduval—a prominent figure in the Salt March at Payyanur. During the Quit India Movement in 1942, Poduval was arrested by the British for delivering lectures in student meetings in Kozhikode and Kannur—for which he was imprisoned for two weeks at the Central Prison, Kannur. Personally and professionally, he dedicated his life to Khadi and Gandhism. In 1944, he joined the Kerala branch of Charkha Sangh. He also dabbled at art—the picture of Bharat Mata that he drew was featured on the cover of Mathrubhumi Azhchappathippu in 1946. In 1947, he became the in-charge the Oorijita Khadi Kendra in Payyanur, under the then Madras Government. He participated in the Bhoodan movement along with Vinoba Bhave and Jayaprakash Narayan. During the early '50s, he worked for Deccan Herald as a journalist—during which he covered Jayaprakash Narayan's speech in Payyanur. In 1957, he took care of the office of the ninth Sarvodaya Sammelan, held at Kalady. In 1962, Poduval became an employee of the Khadi Gramodyog Commission. He has served as Program Executive Officer of Gandhi Smaraka Nidhi, Secretary of Bharatiya Sanskrita Prachara Sabha, Principal of Sanskrit Mahavidyalaya Payyanur and the President of Payyanur Sarvodaya Mandal.

== Personal life ==
Appukutta turned 100 on 9 October 2023. He is married to Athayi Bharathiyamma, and have three children: Yogesh, Mahesh and Gayathri.

== Awards ==
- 2013: G. Kumara Pillai-I.M. Velayudhan Award, instituted by the Poornodaya Book Trust
- 2007: Sahrudaya Tilakam Award from Viswasamskrita Prathishtanam (Kerala chapter of Samskrita Bharati)
- 2023: Padma Shri, Government of India
