= Sudhakaran Ramanthali =

Indian Malayalam-language writer and translator

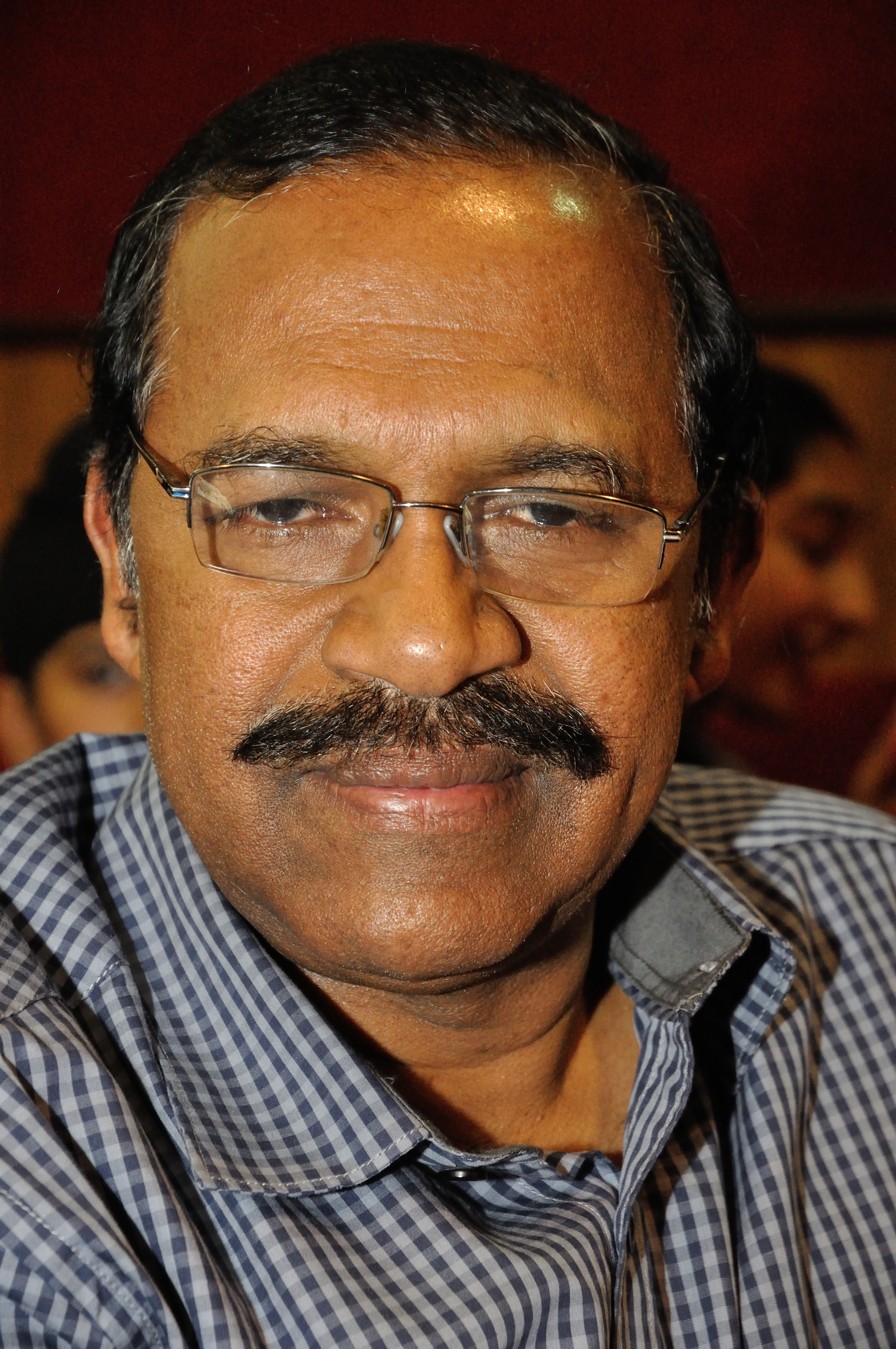
- Born: Sudhakaran; Ramanthali, Kannur district, Kerala
- Occupations: Writer, Translator
- Spouse: Rugmini Sudhakaran
- Children: 3
- Writing career
- Notable work: Shikhara Suryan
- Notable awards: Sahitya Akademi Translation Prize 2020; Karnataka Sahitya Academy Award for Translation Literature 2022

Sudhakaran Ramanthali is a Malayalam language writer and translator from Kerala, India. He has translated 27 works from Kannada to Malayalam. He received many awards including Karnataka Sahitya Academy Award for Translation and Sahitya Akademi Translation Prize.

== Biography ==
Born in the village of Ramanthali near Payyanur in Kannur district, Sudhakaran completed his primary education in a government Malayalam medium school in his native place. After his higher education in Mysore, he joined Hindustan Aeronautics Limited (HAL) in Bangalore.

He was the main person behind the early Bangalore-based newspaper called Bangalore Nadam. Sudhakaran is also a regular contributor to the socio-cultural societies of Bangalore and a frequent guest at literary events in Kerala.

=== Personal life ===
Sudhakaran and his wife Rugmini have three children. They currently lives in Bangalore, Karnataka.

== Career ==
Sudhakaran was not only a writer but also a social activist from a young age. At the age of 20, he joined Hindustan Aeronautics Limited as a technician and joined the Hindustan Aeronautics Employees Association. He later served as a leader of the association for many years. During his tenure at HAL, the company has a Workers' Education class. When the opportunity arose to study English or Kannada, Sudhakaran chose to study Kannada. He started learning Kannada after deciding for himself that Kannada, the state language, should be used to address the workers. His first teacher of Kannada was RN Chandrasekhar, a colleague at HAL, who later became a well-known writer and a prominent leader of the Kannada movement. After work, Chandrasekhar spent hours in the factory colony teaching him literature and discussing literature, sociology, and politics.

Sudhakaran has worked as the coordinator and editor at Kanaka Dasa Study research center at Bangalore and was member of several projects of the English Regional Institute. He also served as the President of the Bengaluru Kairali Arts Committee and Kairali Nilayam Schools.

== Literary career ==
Before starting translations, Sudhakaran Ramanthali has authored three novels, one screenplay and a collection of short stories. His first published work was Ramapurathinte Katha published in 1983.

At the end of an interview with Chandrasekhara Kampara, Sudhakaran was given five books by him and asked if he could translate them into Malayalam. Until then he had not translated any books into Malayalam and that is how he came to translate literature. He first translated Kambara's short novel called GK Mastarude Pranayakalam. But it was published later only. Jokumaraswamy, the first published work, was published in 2013. After that he has translated 27 works by eminent Kannada writers into Malayalam.

== Selected works ==
=== Original works in Malayalam ===
==== Novel ====
- Ramapurathinte katha (in Malayalam). Current Books. 1983..
- Arangozhiyunna Achuthan
- Greeshmasandhyakal
- Raghunathan Urangukayaanu

==== Screenplay ====
- Vazhithirivukal

==== Short story collection ====
- Pingami
- Nam

=== Translations to Malayalam ===
- Shikhara Suryan (in Malayalam). Mathrubhumi Books. 2015. ISBN 9788182665491.. Malayalam translation of Shikhara Surya by Chandrashekhara Kambar
- Karimayi (in Malayalam). Sahithya Paravarthaka Co-operative Society. 2015. ISBN 9789385725586.. Malayalam translation of Karimayi by Chandrashekhara Kambar
- Shivante Kadumthudi (in Malayalam).. Malayalam translation of Shivana Damgura by Chandrashekhara Kambar
- Parvam (in Malayalam). Sahithya Akademi. 2019. ISBN 9789389467932.. Malayalam translation of ‘’Parvam’’ by S. L. Bhyrappa
- Athikramanam (in Malayalam). Sahithya Akademi. 2016. ISBN 9788126051441.. Malayalam translation of Athikramanam by S. L. Bhyrappa
- Divyaṃ (in Malayalam) (First ed.). Kozhikode, Keralam, India: Mathrubhumi Books. February 2017. ISBN 9788182670730. translation of novel Divya by U. R. Ananthamurthy
- Namme vizhungunna Maunam (in Malayalam). DC Books. 2019. ISBN 9789352824465. Malayalam translation of article collection Iruvudellava bittu by Prakash Raj.
- Soothradharanaaru? Veshakkaranaru? (in Malayalam). DC Books. 2019. ISBN 9789352829217. Malayalam translation of article collection by Prakash Raj.
- Jokumaraswami (in Malayalam). Mathrubhumi Books. 2013. ISBN 9788182656055.. Malayalam translation of Jokumaraswami by Chandrashekhara Kambar
- GK Masterude Pranayakaalam (in Malayalam). Alfa One Publishers. 2013. Malayalam translation of novel by Chandrashekhara Kambar
- Ghachar Ghochar, Malayalam translation of Kannada work Ghachar Ghochar by Vivek Shanbhag.
- He also translated the hymns of the 17th century poet Kanaka Dasa into Malayalam, in three volumes, for the Department of Kannada Culture, Government of Karnataka.
- He is currently translating Mahabharata by Kumara Vyasa (Narayanappa) into Malayalam. It is a poem of 48,000 lines.
- He also translated the Kannada novel Su by Prasanna Santhekadur into Malayalam.

== Awards ==
- Sahitya Akademi Translation Prize 2020 for Malayalam translation of ‘’Shikhara Surya’’ by Chandrashekhara Kambar.
- Karnataka Sahitya Academy Award for Translation Literature 2022, for Shivante Kadumthudi, the Malayalam translation of ‘’Shivana Damgura’’ by Chandrashekhara Kambar.
- CV Chathunni Nair Memorial Award for his contribution to Malayalam translation
- Poorna Uroob Award
- The first Mangalam Novel Award for "Ramapurathinte Katha"
- Tejaswini Award of the Mahakavi P Kunhiraman Nair Foundationfor Shivante Kadumthudi, the Malayalam translation of Shivana Damgura by Chandrashekhara Kambar.
