= Kaumudi Teacher =

Indian freedom fighter

Kaumudi Teacher (16 July 1917 - 4 August 2009) was a Gandhian and an Indian freedom activist from Vayakkara in Kannur district, Kerala. She was known for voluntarily donating her ornaments to Gandhi when the latter visited Vatakara on 14 January 1934 which was acknowledged by Gandhi when he wrote an article "Kaumudi's renunciation" in Young India. Kaumudi Teacher died on 4 August 2009 at Kadachira in Kannur.

== Early life ==
Kaumudi Teacher, a Gandhian, renounced gold ornaments to Mahatma Gandhi in the year 1934 for his Harijan fund collection, for the cause of freedom struggle.

Kaumudi was born in a royal family to A K Ramavarma Raja and Devaki Kettilamma on May 17, 1917, at Vayakkara in Kannur district. She later began to take interest in the India freedom struggle and pledged to not wear ornaments after her act of renunciation for the cause of Harijans in 1934.

== Career ==
After matriculation, she studied Hindi and got appointed as the first Hindi teacher in Malabar, at the Government Girls High School. A disciple of Vinobha Bhave, she had also been associated with the Bhoodhan Movement.

She retired from service in 1972 and worked in the ashram of Vinobha Bhave in Thiruvananthapuram. She was also a frequent visitor to Sewagram and Paunar ashrams. She later devoted herself to propagation of khadi and teaching Hindi and decided not to wear ornaments. Kaumudi Teacher's heroic sacrifice has been included in text books as well. She remained unmarried and has been honoured by various Gandhian organizations.

== Kaumudi's renunciation ==
Gandhi had been on a visit to Vatakara on January 14, 1934, in connection with the fund raising for the Harijan Sahaya Samithi. Answering Gandhi's appeal for donation, Kaumudi Teacher gave her gold ornaments to him for the larger cause of the Indian freedom movement. She was only 17 years of age at the time. Her sacrifice was acknowledged by Gandhi in his article titled, ‘Kaumudi’s Renunciation,' which was published in 'Young India.' This text was later translated to all Indian languages and made part of school syllabus.

In his article, Gandhi mentions gives an account of the events that had transpired on the day the renunciation was made. After Gandhi finished giving his speech at Badagara, he had made a reasoned appeal to the women present for jewellery to be donated for raising funds for the Harijan Sahaya Nidhi. Following the speech, Kaumudi took out one bangle and asked Gandhi if he would give his autograph. He was preparing to give it, when off came the other bangle, she had only one on each hand. Upon seeing this, Gandhi said, “You need not give me both, I shall give you the autograph for one bangle only.” She replied by taking off her golden necklace, even as she struggled to disengage it from her long plait of hair, in which the necklace was entangled. She did so, in the presence of a large gathering of both men and women. Upon being asked by Gandhi, on whether she had had the permission of her parents to donate the jewellery, she gave no answer and went ahead in also donating her earring. Gandhi later claims to have found out that her father too was as generous as her, in fact he too was a part of the meeting and was even helping in bidding for the addresses that Gandhi was auctioning. Gandhi then scribbled in an autograph for her, ''Tumhara tyag tumhara bhushan hoga.'' As he handed her the autograph, he prefaced it with the remark, “Your renunciation is a truer ornament than the jewellery you have discarded."

== Death and legacy ==
Kaumudi Teacher died 4 August 2009 in Kannur at the age of 92, due to her failing health. She died a spinster at her brother's residence at Kadachira, after struggling with age-related health problems. On the day of cremation, many a people gathered to pay their respects to her. A contingent of police personnel also offered a gun salute before the body of the 92-year-old Gandhian was taken for cremation. The ceremony observed, the Additional District Magistrate Sudheer Babu also placing a wreath on behalf of Chief Minister V.S. Achuthanandan.
