= Kavvayi Islands =

Kavvayi
- village
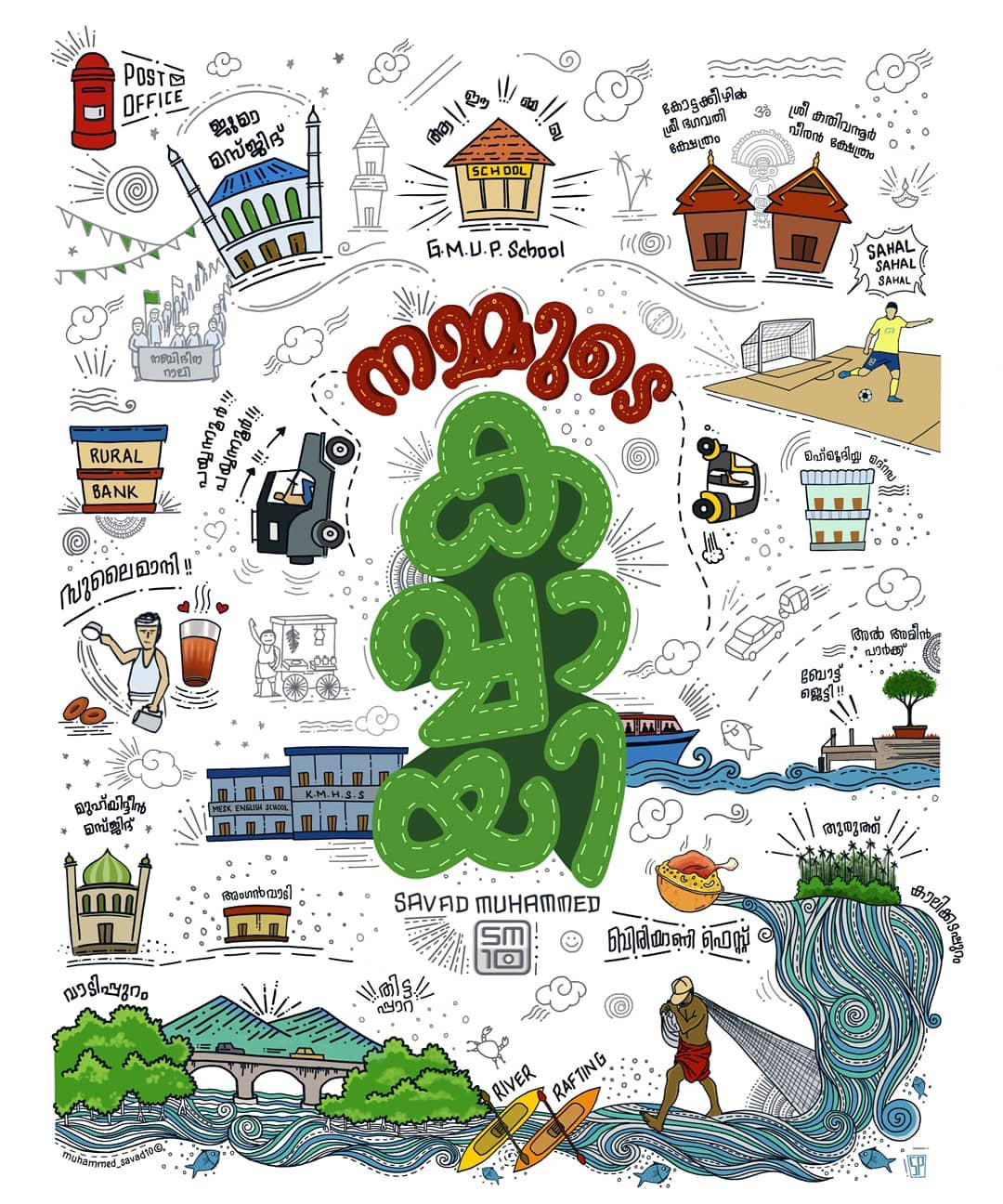
- Doodle of Kavvayi by Savad Muhammed

- Location in Kerala, India Kavvayi (India)
- Coordinates: 12.09°N 75.18°E
- Country: India
- State: Kerala
- District: Kannur
- Taluk: Payyanur

Government
  - Body: Kavvayi - Payyanur Municipality

Population (2011)
  - Total: 2,464

Languages
  - Official: Malayalam, English
- Time zone: UTC+5:30 (IST)
- PIN: 670307
- Telephone code: +91 4985
- ISO 3166 code: IN-KL
- Vehicle registration: KL-86

Kavvayi is a group of small islands, near Payyanur in the Kannur district of Kerala. The island is surrounded by Kavvayi Backwaters.

The island of Kavvayi was originally named Kavvil Pattanam. It was renamed as Kavvayi by Sir William Hogan, the then district collector of Hosdurg.

== History ==
Kavvayi has been mentioned by name by significant global travelers, including Marco Polo (1293 A.D), Ibn Battuta (1342 A.D) and Abdul Feda (1273 A.D).

The island of Kavvayi was originally named "Kavvil Pattanam". It was renamed as Kavvayi by Sir William Hogan, the then district collector of Hosdurg. Kavvayi was the headquarters for an area of 125 square miles (320 km^{2}) which housed a large port and the magistrate court, including during British East India Company rule. It declined after the headquarters were moved to other parts of Malabar.

== Geography ==
Kavvayi is surrounded by Kavvayi Backwaters, which is the third largest backwaters in Kerala and the largest one in north Kerala. Locally called as Kavvayi Kayal or the backwaters of Kavvayi. Kavvayi used to be an inland port and a major administrative center during the past centuries and during British East India Company rule.

A boat terminal is being set up at the Kavvayi-Kalikkadappuram to pave the way for Kavvayi tourism. The boat terminal at Kalikkadappuram is being constructed at a cost of `5.02 crore as part of the Malnad-North Malabar River Cruise Tourism project focusing on the major rivers in Kannur and Kasaragod districts. Work began in November 2019 but was halted in the wake of the COVID-19 expansion. Now the work is progressing rapidly.

== Transport ==
Kavvayi is about 4.5 km drive from Payyanur town towards the direction of Payyanur Railway Station. It is 2 km ride from Payyanur railway station and about 2 hours’ drive from the Kannur International Airport.

== See also ==
- Kavvayi Backwaters
- Payyanur
- Payyanur railway station
