= Koyonkara =

Koyonkara Vadakumbadu
- village
- Country: India
- State: Kerala
- District: Kasargod

Languages
  - Official: Malayalam, English
- Time zone: UTC+5:30 (IST)
- Vehicle registration: KL-60, KL-14

Koyonkara is a small village situated in Trikarpur Panchayath of Kasaragod district, Kerala, India. It constitutes the main part of North Trikarpur Village.

== Education ==
The North Trikarpur ALP School is situated at Koyonkara.

Other near by educational institutions are :-

- VPP Mohd Kunhi Patelar Smarka GVHSS Trikaripur
- EK Nayanar memorial Govt. Polytechnic College
- Udinoor Govt. Higher Secondary School
- Government Higher Secondary School south trikaripur, Elambachi
- St Pauls' AUPS
- Maithani GLPS
- Nehru Arts & Science College Kanhangad
- Payyannur College
- North Malabar Institute of Technology
- Academy of Medical Science Pariyaram
- Sanskrit College Payyannur
- Govt. Ayurveda College
- St. Pius College, Ranipuram
- Rajas College, Neelwshwaram
- Govt. College, Cheemeni etc.

== Health ==
The government ayurvedic hospital is situated at Koyonkara.

The Taluk Government Hospital, Trikarpur, situated at Thankayam is one of the major hospital near to Koyonkara.

There is a private eye hospital in the village.

== Community life ==
Hindu, Muslim and Christianity are the main religions. Koyonkara Poomalakkavu Temple, Koyonkara Pallikal Bhagavathi Temple, Koormba Bhagavathi Temple (Cheermakkavu), Kunhalin Keeshil, vadakumbad juma masjid etc. are the main holy places.

Poomalakavu is famous for "Paatulsavam", Poorakali and Marathukali.

There are many clubs and social organizations working. It includes Malayala Kalavedi, Red Force Arts Sports Club, Vadakumbad arts & sports club (vasc) & Udaya Surya etc.

== Transportation ==
Local roads have access to NH.66 which connects to Mangalore in the north and Calicut in the south. The nearest railway station is Trikarpur on Mangalore-Palakkad line. There are airports at Mangalore and Kannur.
