= Mettammal =

Mettammal mattemal Mettammel
- south thrikaripur
- Location in Kerala, India Mettammal (India)
- Coordinates: 12°8′N 75°10′E
- Country: India
- State: Kerala
- District: Kasaragod

Languages
  - Official: Malayalam, English
- Time zone: UTC+5:30 (IST)
- -671311PIN -->: 671311
- Vehicle registration: KL-14, KL-13
- Nearest city: Payyannur
- Lok Sabha constituency: Kasaragod

Mettammal is a village in India, located in Trikaripur Panchayath in Kasaragod district in Kerala State.

== Transportation ==
Local roads have access to NH.66 which connects to Mangalore in the north and Calicut in the south. The nearest railway station is Cheruvathur on Mangalore-Palakkad line. There are airports at Mangalore and Calicut.
