= Kankole =

- Village
- Location in Kerala, India Kankole (India)
- Coordinates: 12.155609°N 75.223773°E
- Country: India
- State: Kerala
- District: Kannur

Government
  - Type: Panchayati raj (India)
  - Body: Kankole-Alappadamba Grama Panchayat

Area
  - Total: 16.77 km^{2} (6.47 sq mi)

Population (2011)
  - Total: 10,665
  - Density: 636.0/km^{2} (1,647/sq mi)

Languages
  - Official: Malayalam, English
- Time zone: UTC+5:30 (IST)
- PIN: 670 307
- Telephone code: 91 4985
- ISO 3166 code: IN-KL
- Vehicle registration: KL-86
- Nearest city: Payyanur
- Sex ratio: 1113 female(s)/1000 male(s)/ ♂/♀
- Literacy: 94.3%
- Lok Sabha constituency: Kasargod
- Vidhan Sabha constituency: Payyanur

Kankol is a village in Kannur district of Kerala state in India. Kankol village is a part of Kankol Alapadamba Grama Panchayath, which had won the Swaraj Trophy (1999–2000) for the best grama panchayath in Kerala state. Post office and village office representing Kankol are situated in the place named Kundayamkovval.

== Demographics ==
As of 2011 census of India, Kankole had total population of 10,665 where 5,048 are males and 5,617 are females. Kankole village spreads over an area of 16.77 km^{2} with 2,576 families residing in it. The sex ratio was 1,113 higher than state average of 1,084. In Kankole, Population of children under 6 years was 9.9%. Kankole had overall literacy of 94.3%, higher than national average of 59% and state average of 94%.

== Culture ==
As a part of cultural maintenance and development, villagers has built many clubs and libraries in this village. Kankol Vayanasala and Grandhalayam is one library with good collection of books. (Vayanasala = Reading Room, Grandhalayam = Library).

== Theyyam ==
Like any other place in Kannur, theyyam (a ritual art form) and religious festivals (Kaliyattam) of various temples is an attraction of Kankole. Kankole Sri Kalari Bhagavathi Temple is one of the most famous temple for theyyam festival. Which happens in the fourth week of December every year. There are many more temples and tharavads (is a system of joint family practised by people in Kerala, especially Nairs) where theyyam plays every year as the part of their devotion.

== Kankol Shiva Temple ==
Temple situated in the heart of the village, people believes that, Lord Shiva and Panayakkattu Bhagavathi (Theyyam - Incarnation of Goddess Parvathi) are protecting the village from enemies and disasters. Kankole Shiva Temple is quite famous in the list of temples in Kerala.

== Kalari Bhagavathi Temple ==
Kalari Bhagavathi Temple is famous for theyyam, and plays every year in the fourth week of December for 5 or 6 days. There are four core types of theyyam:

- Panayakkattu Bhagavathi
- Vellarangara Bhagavathi
- Vishnu Moorthi
- Pulikantan

Every year starting ceremony takes place on 26 December and closing would happen as per the prayers of the devotees. Which may be 31 December or 1 January the next year. People reach here to pray for a better tomorrow and better years ahead.

In the final day of the festival, all pregnant women in the village and nearby villages come here to drink the tender coconut water blessed by Panayakkattu Bhagavathi, people believe that, the mother who drank this blessed drink would have a blessed child.

Kankole Panayakkattu, Kankole Kannangattu and more temples are in the village.

== Kankole Shiva Kshetra Maithanam ==
Kankole Shiva Temple playground, which is one of the famous playgrounds for Sevens football in Kannur district. This is the home ground of YSC (Yuvajana Sports Club) Kankol.

== Seed Farm ==
State seed farm in Kankol is one of the Departmental Seed Farms in Kerala by the government. This seed farm is associated with an area of land for farming paddy, sesame seeds and more.

== 110KV Substation ==
Payyannur 110KV electrical substation is in Kankol Village. which transfers electricity to the Payyanur and the nearest areas.

== Transportation ==
The national highway passes through Perumba junction. Goa and Mumbai can be accessed on the northern side and Cochin and Thiruvananthapuram can be accessed on the southern side. The road to the east of Iritty connects to Mysore and Bangalore. The nearest railway station is Payyanur on Mangalore-Palakkad line. Trains are available to almost all parts of India subject to advance booking over the internet. There are airports at Kannur, Mangalore and Calicut. All of them are international airports but direct flights are available only to Middle Eastern countries.

== History ==
Name of this place of emanated from the name of a Vedic Sage Kapila, who conducted Dakshayaga for Daksha. Daksha is a Sanskrit word said to be a Prajapati or one of the Brahma's sons. The equivalent meaning in English is Competent. One of the daughter of Prajapati (often said to be the youngest) was Sati or Dakshayani, who had always wished to marry Shiva. Daksha forbade it, but she disobeyed him and did so anyway, finding in Shiva a doting and loving husband. Daksha disliked Shiva intensely, calling him a dirty, roaming ascetic and reviling the great yogi's cohort of goblins and ghouls.

From then on, he distanced himself from his daughter, Dakshayani/Sati, and his son-in-law, Shiva. This enmity culminated in a great sacrifice he had been hosting, one to which he invited all and sundry, family and allies, gods and rishis, courtiers and subjects. Consciously excluding Sati from the list, he also set up a statue of Shiva, which he defiled and mocked, at the entrance to his hall. Sati, ebullient at the thought of such a great event, and assuming that the daughter of the king was welcome no matter what, attended the festival. Snubbed by her father and treated with disdain, Sati nonetheless maintained her composure. Indeed, even her father's refusal to invite Shiva, her husband and thus a traditionally honored member of any Hindu family, was to some extent borne.

Shiva carrying the corpse of his consort दाक्षायनि (सती) Dakshayani (Sati). However, on seeing the shameless insult to her husband in his absence, and the repeated slights King Daksha and his courtiers railed at Shiva, she committed suicide in grief for her beloved. Hearing the news, Shiva's attendants rushed inside the ceremony hall and started attacking all the guests present there, however, the demons invoked by Bhrigu defeated Shivas attendants and they retreated back to his abode. Upon hearing the news of his beloved wife's death, Shiva was furious that Daksha could so callously cause the harm of his (Daksha's) own daughter in so ignoble a manner. Shiva grabbed a lock of his matted hair and dashed it to the ground. From the two pieces rose the ferocious Virabhadra and the terrible Rudrakali, while Bhadrakali arose from the wrath of Devi herself. Upon Shiva's orders they stormed the ceremony and killed Daksha as well as many of the guests. Terrified and with remorse the others propitiated Lord Shiva and begged his mercy to restore Daksha's life and to allow the sacrifice to be completed. Shiva, the all-merciful One, restored Daksha's life, with the head of a goat. In his humility, and repentance for his graceless and sinful acts, Daksha became one of Shiva's most devoted, attendants.

According to belief this happened in this place now known as Kankol. As this disgraceful event happened in this place, the second part of Daksha Yagna is happened in the place named Kottiyur, in Kannur District.

The place is blessed with the presence of Lord Shiva with Shiva temple. From the belief, there is a place named "yagabhumi"(where the Yagna took place), in Kankol Village. Formerly name of the place was Kapilan Kovval and which is shortened as Kankol.
