= Payyannur Pavithra ring =

Kind of gold ring worn by Indians

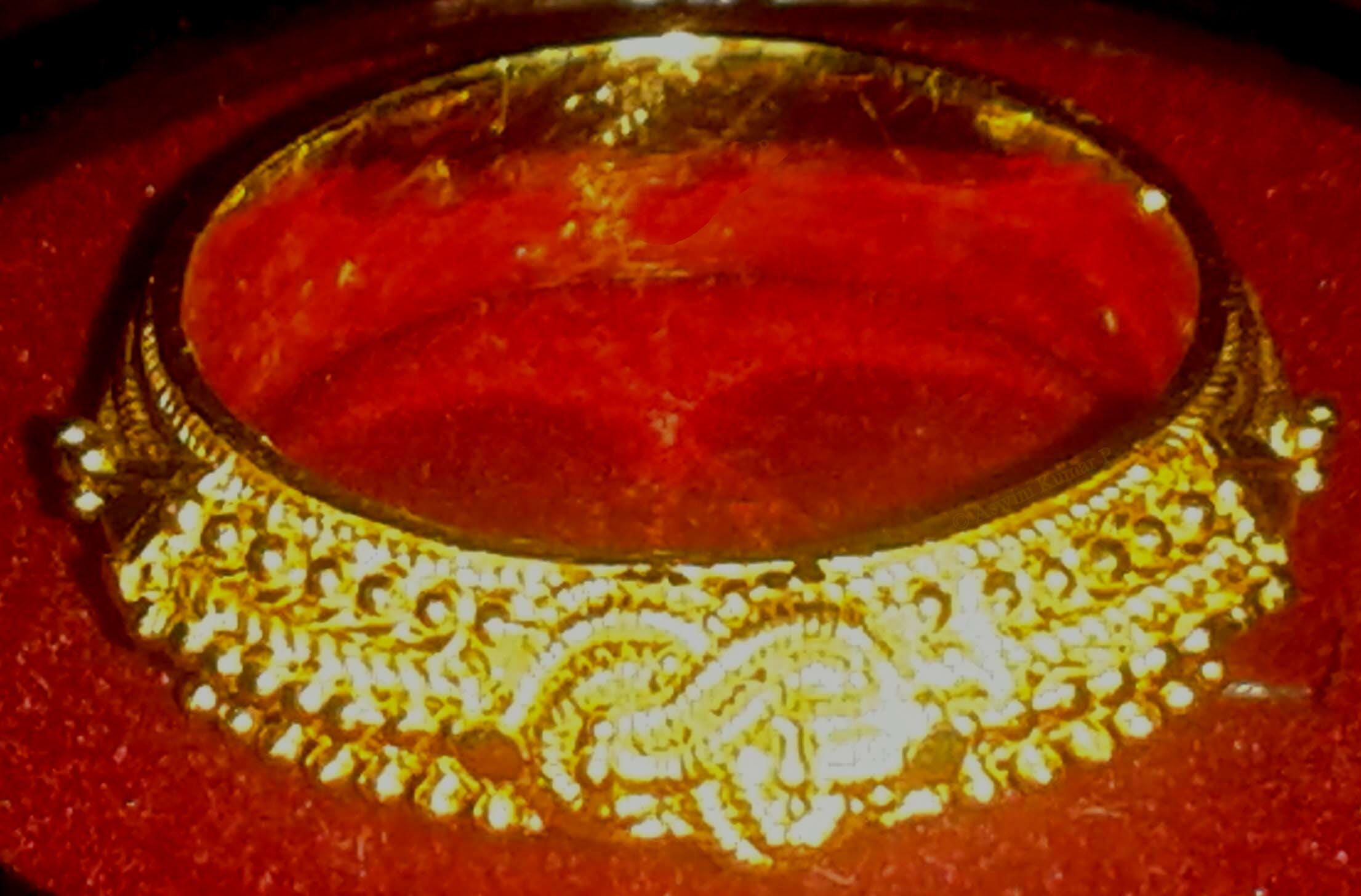
Payyannur Holy Ring

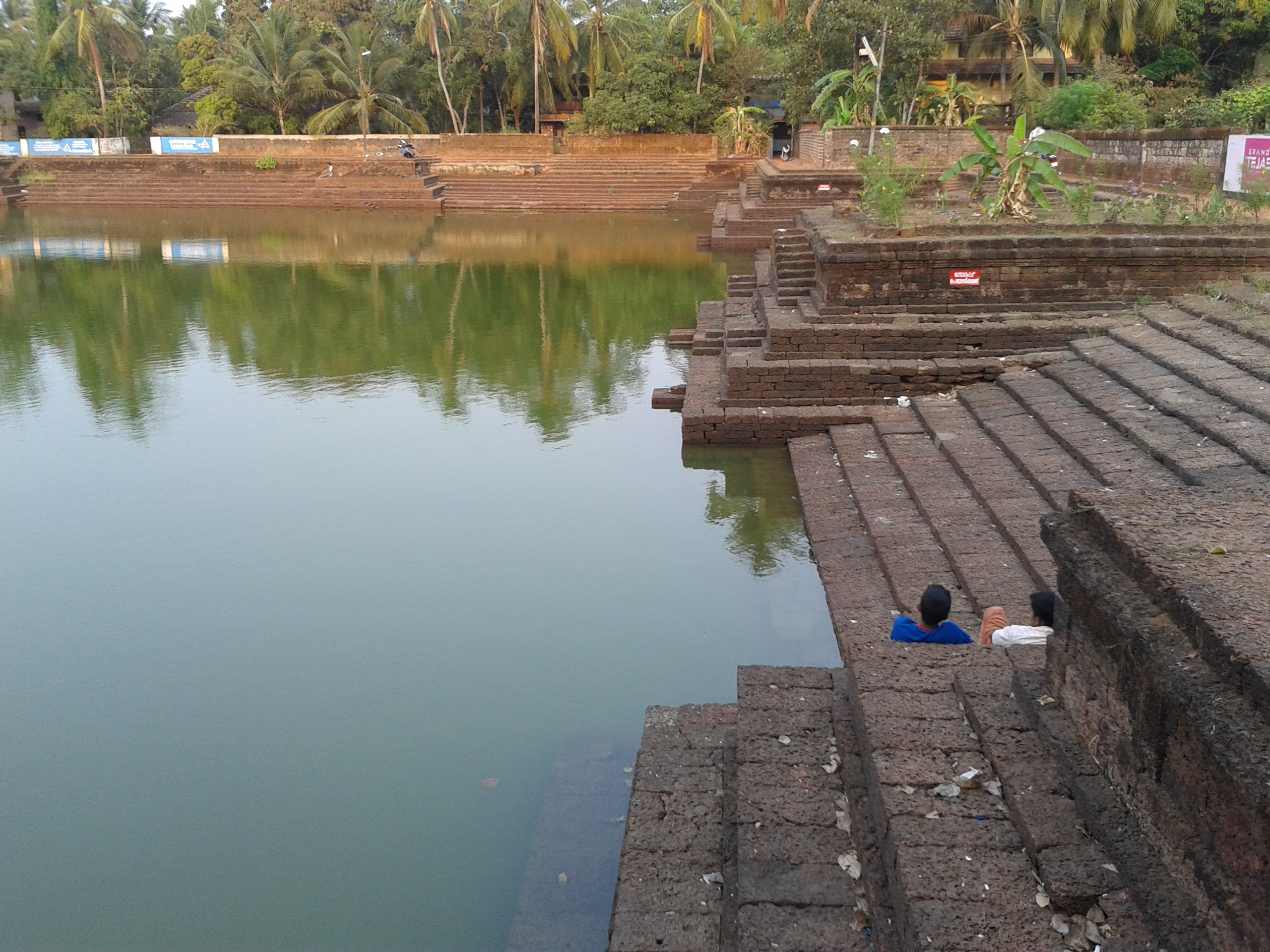
Shree Subramanya Swamy Temple, Payyannur

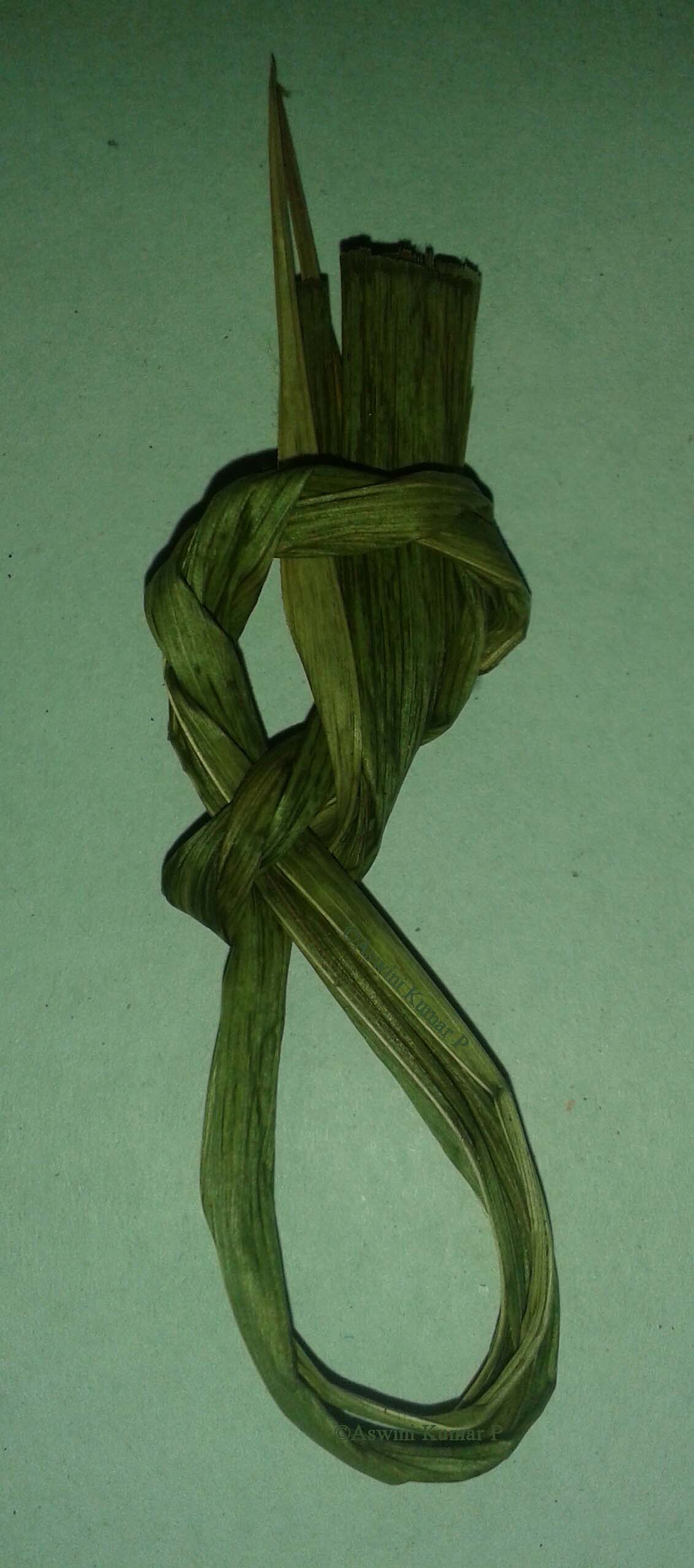
The historical holy ring

Payyannur Pavithra Mothiram is a kind of gold ring worn by Indians for its ritualistic value. This holy ring is worn during the rituals of pithru bali, or the prayer for the dead ancestors of the person. This ring was traditionally made of Dharba grass. However, the modern Pavithra Mothiram is made of gold. The shape of the ring is unique, and it looks like a knot. Silver is also used for making the ring. It is worn on the right ring finger while performing poojas for the dead ancestors.

== History ==
The origin of the holy is associated with the history of the Payyannur Subramanya Temple. The temple used to insist on wearing grass rings while performing holy rites. Later on, the priests switched to gold rings for the purpose of durability. A traditional craftsman takes a whole day to one ring. They cannot eat meat or drink alcohol during their lifetime to become a holy artisan.

== Etymology ==
The word 'pavithram' means 'purity' and 'Mothiram' means 'ring'. The former word is from the Sanskrit language while the latter is from the Malayalam language which is the local language of the Kerala state in India.

== Shape ==
There are three lines on the outer surface of the ring and they represent three rivers of human body: Ida, Pingala and Sushumna. The combination of these three rivers can awaken the vital energy or 'Kundalini Sakthi' in human beings.

== Trimoorthi Chaithanyam ==
According to the belief of Payyannur Hindus, the wearing of the sacred ring can awaken the power of three gods of Hinduism: Brahma, Shiva and Vishnu. There are rigorous rituals to be followed by the maker of the ring and the person who is wearing them. They cannot eat any meat and alcohol is totally prohibited. Women have to remove the ring during menstruation. The ring is given to the customer only after being sanctified at Subramanya Temple in Payyannur.

== Popularity ==
Payyannur Pavithra Mothiram is being exhibited in many museums around the world. The noted freedom fighter of India Shri C.V. Kunhambu was an expert in making this holy ring.

== Yoga connection ==
According to the ancient Indian conceptions of yoga, there are three rivers of energy in human body and the smooth flow of these rivers ensures health and prosperity of the person.

1. Pingala on the right side of the body represents solar energy.
2. Ida on the left side of the spinal cord represents energy of the moon.
3. Sushuma in the middle represents cosmic energy.

The Kundalini Shakthi lies at the bottom of these three rivers and it can evoke powerful emotions in the human body. Indians believe that the ring can arouse divine powers because of its unique design. It can be worn only on the ring finger of the right hand. A person who wears this ring is supposed to have a higher level of intelligence, happiness and wisdom.

== Commercial aspects ==
The concept of the Payyannur Holy Ring has been commercially utilized. Many jewellers claim to make original Payyannur Pavithra rings. The vendors claim that the ring can bring a higher level of enlightenment and inspiration in the person using it. One holy ring can cost from $400 to $1,500 according to the quality and range. Nowadays the ring is made of 22 karat gold.

== How to wear ==
The Pavithra Mothiram can be worn only on the right hand and that too only on the ring finger. According to Hindu Shasthras, each finger of the human body has different meanings and functions:

1. The thumb represents fire
2. The index finger represents the sky and the flowers.
3. The middle finger represents fire and holy lamps.
4. The ring finger represents water
5. The little finger represents earth and sandal paste.

== See also ==
- Chaithanyam
- Trimoorthi
