= C. Krishnan (born 1949) =

Indian politician

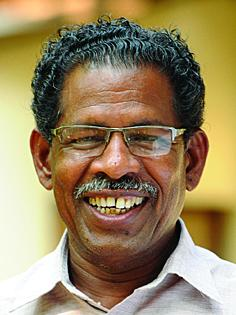

MLA of Kerala Assembly for Payyanur
- In office 2011–2021
- Preceded by: P. K. Sreemathy
- Succeeded by: T. I. Madhusoodanan
- Constituency: Payyanur

Personal details
- Born: 6 June 1949 (age 77) Payyanur, Kerala
- Party: Communist Party of India (Marxist)
- Spouse: Smt. T.V. Rajavalli

C. Krishnan is an Indian politician from the state of Kerala, and a member of the Legislative Assembly of Kerala. He represents the Payyanur constituency of Kerala and is a member of the Communist Party of India (Marxist)(CPI(M)).
