= Vayakkara =

- Village
- Location in Kerala, India Vayakkara (India)
- Coordinates: 12°15′0″N 75°19′30″E
- Country: India
- State: Kerala
- District: Kannur
- Taluk: Payyanur

Area
  - Total: 39.7 km^{2} (15.3 sq mi)

Population (2011)
  - Total: 18,687
  - Density: 471/km^{2} (1,220/sq mi)

Languages
  - Official: Malayalam, English
- Time zone: UTC+5:30 (IST)
- PIN: 670 631
- ISO 3166 code: IN-KL
- Vehicle registration: KL 86

Vayakkara is a village located in Payyanur Taluk of Kannur district in the Indian state of Kerala.

== Demographics ==
As of 2011 Census, Vayakkara village had a population of 18,687, where 8,986 are males and 9,701 are females. Vayakkara village has an area of 39.7 km^{2} (15.3 sq mi) with 4,493 families residing in it. In Vayakkara, 10.6% of the population was under the age of six. Vayakkara had an average literacy of 94.45%, higher than the state average of 94.00%: male literacy was 96.2% and female literacy was 92.8%.

== Transportation ==
The national highway (NH 66) passes through Perumba junction. Mangalore and Mumbai can be accessed on the northern side and Cochin and Thiruvananthapuram can be accessed on the southern side. The road to the east connects to Mysore and Bangalore. The nearest railway station is Kannur on Mangalore-Palakkad line. There are airports at Mangalore and Calicut.

== Notable people ==
- Kaumudi Teacher (1917-2009), Gandhian and Indian freedom activist
