= Kavvayi Backwaters =

Island in India

Kavvayi
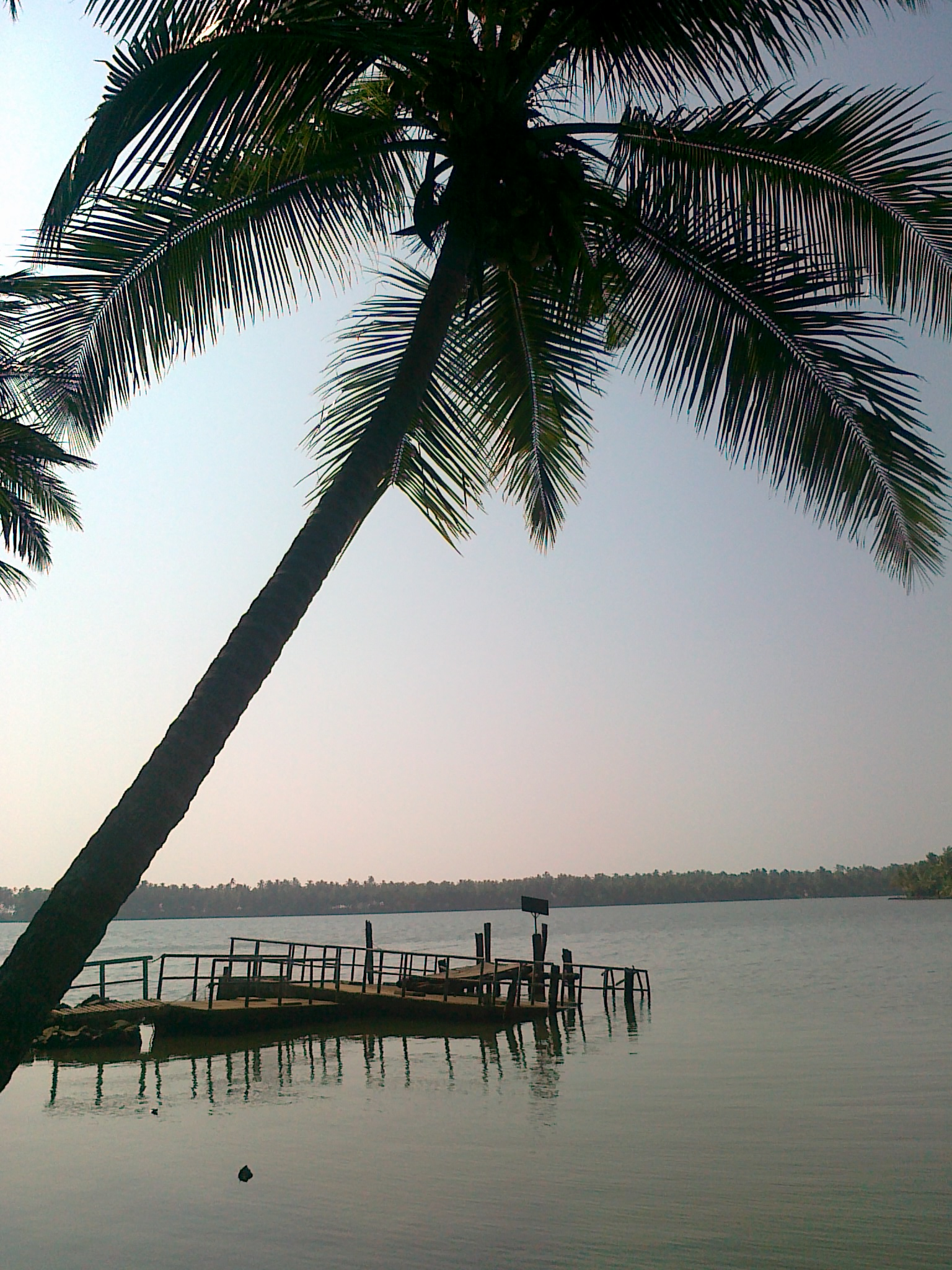
- Kavvayi boat jetty

- Location in Kerala, India Kavvayi (India)
- Location: Kerala
- Coordinates: 12.09°N 75.18°E
- Primary inflows: Kavvayi River
- Basin countries: India
- Surface area: 37 km^{2} (14 sq mi)
- Islands: Kavvayi

Kavvayi Backwaters, located near Payyanur, is the third largest backwater in Kerala and the largest one in north Kerala.

The Kavvayi Kayal (backwaters) is dotted with several islands of various size. Valiyaparamba is the largest among them at over 16 square kilometres (6.2 sq mi).

== Islands of Kavvayi Backwaters ==
- Kavvayi Islands
- Valiyaparamba
- Padannakkadappuram
- Vadakkekkadu
- Kokkal
- Edayilakkad
- Madakkal
- Kannuveed
- Kavvayikkadappuram
- Udumbanthala
- Kochen
- Vadakkumbad

== Geography ==
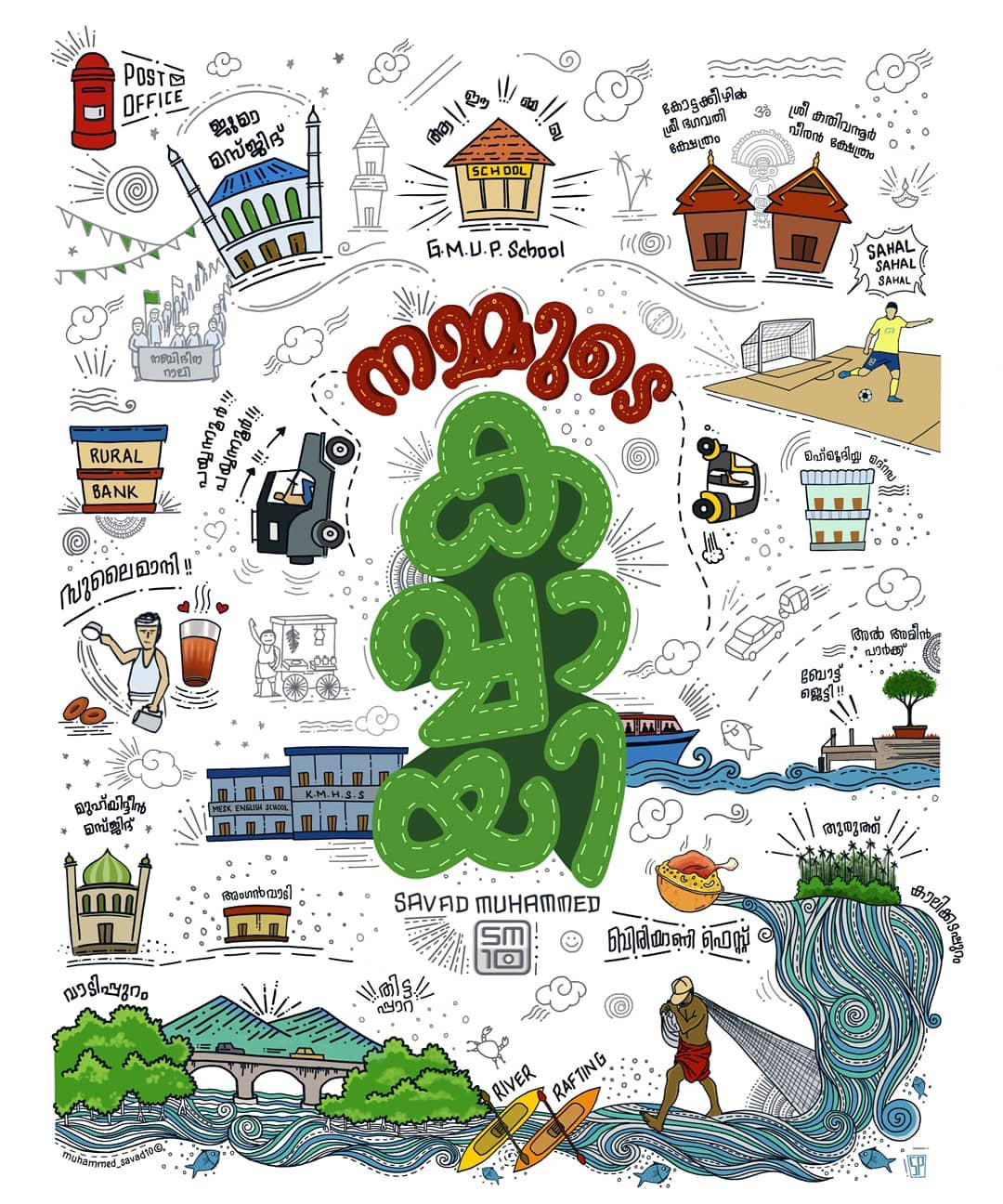
Doodle of Kavvayi_by Savad Muhammed

The Kavvayi Backwaters, located near Payyannur, are the third largest backwaters in Kerala and the largest one in north Kerala. Locally called as Kavvayi Kayal or the backwaters of Kavvayi, this lesser known lake of northern Kerala is fed by the River Kavvayi and its tributary streams: Kankol, Vannathichal, Kuppithodu, and Kuniyan. The Kavvayi Backwaters are named after the Kavvayi Islands close to Payyannur. Kavvayi used to be an inland port and a major administrative center during the past centuries and during British East India Company rule.

The northern portion of Kavvayi Lake is also known as Valiyaparamba backwaters. This island has a population of 10,000. The island's main source of income come from agriculture and fishing. A secluded beach named Valiparamba beach runs parallel to the backwaters on its western side.

Ecologically, the backwater of Kavvayi and its surrounding region is considered to be of significance. The Kavvayi backwater is the biggest wetland ecosystem in north Kerala with an area of 37 km^{2}. The backwater and the wetlands are home to a variety of fauna and flora.

Valiyaparamba is one of the main tourist spots of the Kasaragod district and is also a fishing centre.

- Kavvayi 3 km from Payyanur
- Ramanthali 6 km from Payyanur
- Trikarpur 7 km from Payyanur
- Kunhimangalam Village 8 km from Payyanur
- Karivellur 10 km from Payyanur
- Ezhimala 12 km from Payyanur
- Peringome 20 km from Payyanur

== Transportation ==
There is bus and jeep service to Payyanur town. The national highway passes through Perumba junction. Goa and Mumbai can be accessed on the northern side and Cochin and Thiruvananthapuram can be accessed on the southern side. The road to the east of Iritty connects to Mysore and Bangalore. The nearest railway station is Payyanur on Mangalore-Palakkad line. Trains are available to almost all parts of India subject to advance booking over the internet. There are airports at Kannur, Mangalore and Calicut. All of them are international airports but direct flights are available only to Middle Eastern countries.
