= Vivek Shanbhag =

Indian story writer, novelist and playwright in Kannada

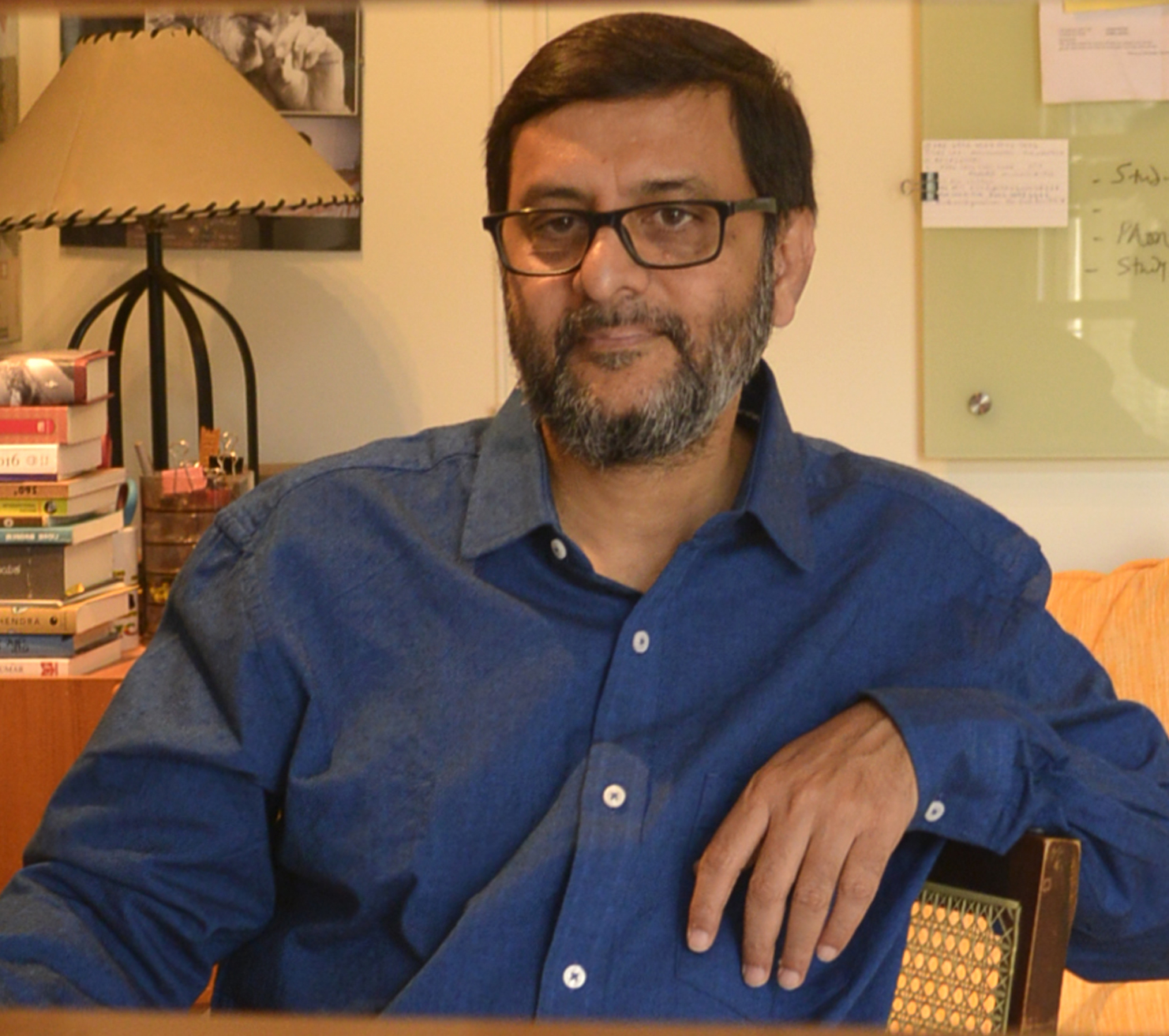
- Born: Vivek Shanbhag; 1962; Sirsi, Karnataka, India
- Occupations: Engineer, Writer
- Writing career
- Period: 1984-present
- Genres: Story, Novella, Novel and Plays
- Subject: Various Themes
- Notable works: Ghachar Ghochar, Ooru Bhanga, Ondu Badi Kadalu, Innu Ondu, Langaru and Huli Savaari
- Movement: Navyottara
- Website: vivekshanbhag.com

Vivek Shanbhag is an Indian story writer, novelist and playwright in Kannada. He is the author of ten works of fiction and three plays, all of which have been published in Kannada. His works have been translated into English and several other Indian languages. Vivek Shanbhag also worked as editor for the literary magazine "Desha Kaala" for 7 years. "Desha Kaala" was considered one of the best literary magazines in Kannada.

Shanbhag was a Writer in Residence at the International Writing Program at the University of Iowa during the fall of 2016. Vivek Shanbhag is considered one of the finest writers of Kannada Literature. "Huli Savaari", "Kantu", "Noolina Eni", "Guruthu", "Langaru", "Ankura", "Mattobbana Samsara", "Sharvana Services", "Ghachar Gochar", "Innu Ondu", "Ondu Badi Kadalu" and "Ooru Bhanga" are his best contribution to the Kannada fiction. His short stories and novels are highly praised by critics. Through his 2013 novella Ghachar Ghochar he got huge recognition as a writer from all over the world.

Sakina's Kiss was shortlisted for the James Tait Black Prize for fiction in 2026.

== Works ==
=== Collection of Short Stories ===
- Ankura (1985)
- Langaru (1992)
- Huli Savaari (1995)
- Mattobbana Samsara (2005)

=== Novella ===
- Ghachar Ghochar (2013)

=== Novels ===
- Innu Ondu (2001)
- Ondu Badi Kadalu (2007)
- Ooru Bhanga (2015)
- Sakinala Muttu (2021), translated into English as Sakina’s Kiss (2023)

=== Plays ===
- Sakkare Gombe (1999)
- Bahumukhi (2007)
- Illiruvudu Summane (2021)

=== Editor ===
- Sirigannada [English] (2001)
- Srikrishna Alanahalli Vaachike (2010)
