= Ramanthali =

- village
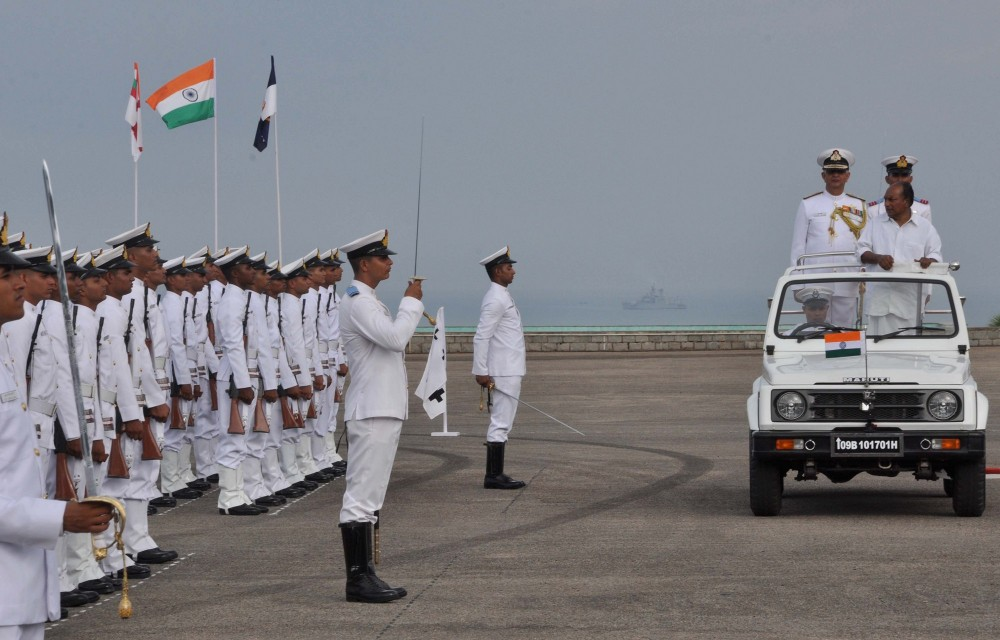
- Naval Academy, Ramanthali

- Location in Kerala, India Ramanthali (India)
- Coordinates: 12°3′0″N 75°11′0″E
- Country: India
- State: Kerala
- District: Kannur

Population (2011)
  - Total: 25,711

Languages
  - Official: Malayalam, English
- Time zone: UTC+5:30 (IST)
- ISO 3166 code: IN-KL
- Nearest city: Payyanur

Ramanthali is a village in Kannur district in the Indian state of Kerala. It contains the gateway for the Indian Naval Academy in Ezhimala.

== Demographics ==
As of 2011 India census, Ramanthali had a population of 25,711, with 12,526 males and 13,185 females. Anjaneyagiri, famous Hanuman statue is situated here.

== Ettikkulam ==
The southern side of Ramanthali village is called Ettikkulam. There is a lighthouse here.

== Transportation ==
The national highway passes through Perumba junction. Goa and Mumbai can be accessed on the northern side and Cochin and Thiruvananthapuram can be accessed on the southern side. The road to the east of Iritty connects to Mysore and Bangalore. The nearest railway station is Payyanur on Mangalore-Palakkad line. Trains are available to almost all parts of India subject to advance booking over the internet. There are airports at Kannur, Mangalore and Calicut. All of them are international airports but direct flights are available only to Middle Eastern countries.

== Notable people ==
- Sudhakaran Ramanthali, writer and translator.
- Prabhakar K. Nair (Prabhakar Alathunkaatt) Producer and writer.

== See also ==
- Ramanthali inscriptions
- Payyannur
- Valiyaparamba Backwaters 15 km from Payyanur
- Peringome 20 km from Payyanur
- Ezhimala 12 km from Payyanur Town
- Kunhimangalam village 8 km from Payyanur town
- Kavvayi Island 3 km from Payyanur
- Karivellur 10 km from Payyanur
- Trikarpur 6 km from Payyanur
