= Ghachar Ghochar =

Book by Vivek Shanbhag

- First English edition, published in 2015
- Author: Vivek Shanbhag
- Translator: Srinath Perur
- Language: Kannada
- Genre: Psychological drama
- Publisher: HarperPerennial
- Publication date: December 2015
- Publication place: India
- Media type: Print (paperback, hardback)
- Pages: 124
- ISBN: 9351776174

Ghachar Ghochar is a 2013 psychological drama novella written by Kannada author Vivek Shanbhag and was translated into English by Srinath Perur. Set in Bangalore, the book is about an unnamed narrator who reminisces about his dysfunctional family's rags to riches story which results in troubling behavioural changes in each of them. The title is a made-up phrase, invented by the narrator's wife and her brother, which means "tangled up beyond repair".

Ghachar Ghochar was included by The New York Times in their listing of the best books of 2017 and it was a finalist for the Los Angeles Times Book Prize and the International Dublin Literary Award.

== Plot ==
The novel is the first-person account of an unnamed, sensitive young man. He regularly visits an old-world coffee shop in Bangalore where he is drawn towards a laconic waiter named Vincent, who the man believes possess prophetic abilities. The man reminisces about his bond with a young feminist named Chitra, whom he unceremoniously cast aside, but his mind mostly wanders towards his dysfunctional family, consisting of his parents, uncle, and a divorced, elder sister. He recollects the rags to riches story of his family, and worries about the deteriorating relationship between him and his wife, Anita, who is troubled by his lack of motivation and apathy towards his family's misdeeds.

== Characters ==
- Narrator (unnamed)
- Anita, the narrator's wife
- Amma, the narrator's mother
- Appa, the narrator's father
- Chikkappa, the narrator's uncle
- Malati, the narrator's elder sister
- Vincent, a waiter whom the narrator considers prophetic
- Chitra, a former acquaintance of the narrator

== Reception ==
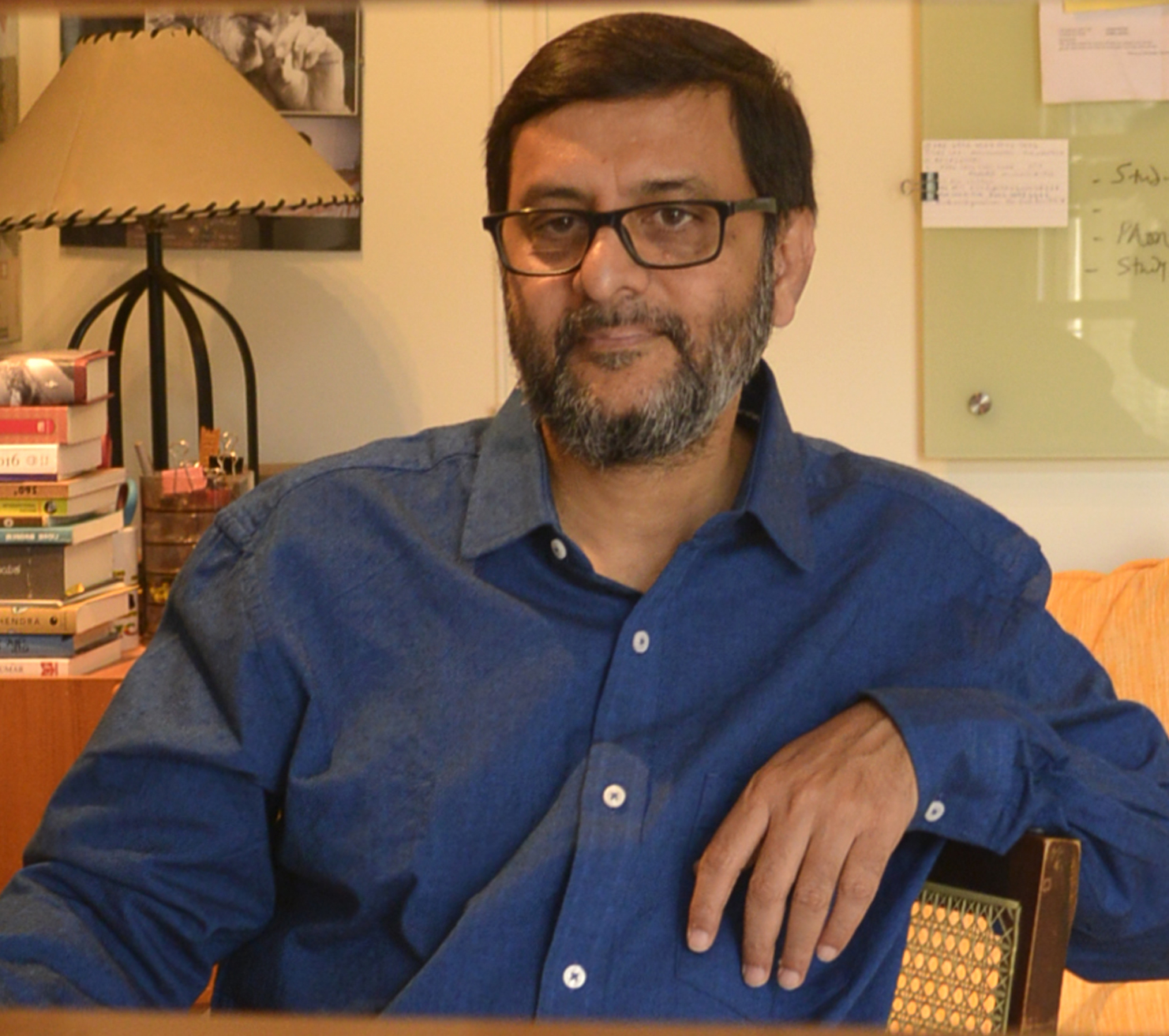
The author, Vivek Shanbhag, pictured in 2017

Writing for The New York Times, Parul Sehgal considered Ghachar Ghochar to be "a great Indian novel" and wrote, "Folded into the compressed, densely psychological portrait of [the narrator's] family is a whole universe: a parable of rising India, an indictment of domestic violence, a taxonomy of ants and a sly commentary on translation itself." Deborah Smith of The Guardian reviewed that the book was "both fascinatingly different from much Indian writing in English, and provides a masterclass in crafting, particularly on the power of leaving things unsaid."

Eileen Battersby of The Irish Times labelled Ghachar Ghochar as "one of the finest literary works you will ever encounter"; she drew comparisons to the works of R. K. Narayan, Anton Chekhov and Machado de Assis and found the unnamed narrator to be reminiscent of the protagonist in Ivan Goncharov’s Russian novel Oblomov. Lucy Scholes of The Independent too took note of the comparisons to Chekhov and wrote that "brevity serves Shanbhag’s storytelling to great effect, not least because much of what makes the narrative so gripping lies in what he leaves unsaid." Reviewing the book for The Globe and Mail, Jade Colbert found the unnamed narrator to be "a superfluous man of the type Chekhov might recognize" and commended Shanbhag for subtlety conveying the troubled "gender dynamic" in India.

Preti Taneja of the New Statesman took note of the book's feminist themes and wrote, "Perur’s translation captures the heartbreaking achievement of Shanbhag’s writing: to present, in a line or two, a body and mind coming of age in a society that casts violence as tenderness, ownership as love." Writing for Hindustan Times, Prajwal Parajuly praised Shanbhag for finding emotional depth in his sparse prose.

The New York Times included Ghachar Ghochar in their literary critics' listing of the best books of 2017. The book was longlisted for the International Dublin Literary Award in 2017 and was a finalist for the Los Angeles Times Book Prize in 2018.

== Translations ==
Srinath Perur has translated the original Kannada Ghachar Ghochar by Vivek Shanbhag into English. Sudhakaran Ramanthali has translated it into Malayalam with same title. K Nallathambi has translated it into tamil with same title. Aparna Naigaonkar has translated it into Marathi with same title.
