= Alapadamba =

- village
- Location in Kerala, India Alapadamba (India)
- Coordinates: 12.191°N 75.235°E
- Country: India
- State: Kerala
- District: Kannur

Government
  - Type: Panchayati raj (India)
  - Body: Kankole-Alappadamba Grama Panchayat

Area
  - Total: 25.25 km^{2} (9.75 sq mi)

Population (2011)
  - Total: 8,660
  - Density: 343/km^{2} (888/sq mi)

Languages
  - Official: Malayalam, English
- Time zone: UTC+5:30 (IST)
- PIN: 670307
- ISO 3166 code: IN-KL
- Vehicle registration: KL-86

Alapadamba is a village situated in Payyanur taluk of Kannur district in the Indian state of Kerala.

== Demographics ==
As of 2011 India census, Alappadamba had total population of 8,660 where 4,173 are males and 4,487 are females. Alappadamba village spreads over an area of 25.25 km^{2} with 2,233 families residing in it. The sex ratio was 1,075, lower than state average of 1,084. In Alappadamba, Population of children under 6 years was 8.9%. Alappadamba had overall literacy of 93.5%, higher than national average of 59% and lower than state average of 94%.
