= Kookkanam Rahman =

Kookkanam Rahman (also known as M. T. P Abdul Rahman) is a social worker, writer, orator and retired teacher living in the South Indian state of Kerala.

== Early life ==
Rahman was born on 8 November 1950 in Kookkanam, a tiny hamlet of the Karivellur-Peralam Grama Panchayat in Kannur district. After receiving primary education at Olattu Aided Upper Primary School, he went on to study at Government High School at Karivellur (currently known as A.V. Smaraka Government Higher Secondary School), Government College at Kasaragod, Sree Narayana Teachers’ Training Institute at Nileshwaram and Government Training College at Thalassery.

== Teaching career ==
He began his career as a teacher at North Upper Primary School in Karivellur on 3 August 1970. Later, he served at Government Upper Primary School at Panappuzha (Kannur district), Government Lower Primary School at Mavila Kadappuram (Kasargod district), Government Upper Primary School at Padanna (Kasargod district), Government Fisheries High School at Cheruvathur (Kasargod district), Government High School at Kuttamath (Kasargod district) and Government High School at Pilicode (Kasargod district). In between, he worked as the Kasargod District Co-ordinator of the Total Literacy Campaign in 1990 that made Kerala the first Indian State to achieve 100 per cent literacy, Project Officer during the second phase of the literacy campaign, District Primary Education Programme (DPEP) trainer and Sarva Shiksha Abhiyan (SSA) programme officer in his 36-year long career.

== Social service ==
It was in 1978 that Rahman became active in social service when he came up with a novel initiative to conduct night classes for the working class youth who could not continue formal education owing to their poor financial background. The night class helped the youngsters, who worked either as Beedi rollers or weavers during the day to earn a living, earn formal education and pass the Grade 7 and Grade 10 examinations. The first batch saw 23 students clearing the Grade 10 examination. The initiative continued till 1985, helping approximately 200 youngsters attain formal education. The concept created ripples in Kerala, even as many students went on to achieve higher educational qualifications. Many of the successful students are now working various central and state government departments. Inspired by the activities of P.N. Panicker, P.T. Bhaskara Panicker and K. Sivadasan Pillai, three prominent social workers in Kerala, Rahman became active functionary of Kerala Association for Non-Formal Education and Development (KANFED), a voluntary organisation that spearheaded literacy and library movements in Kerala. He led the organisation’s activities in Kannur and Kasargod districts. During this period, he successfully coordinated the ‘Three-month Literacy Programme’ in Kinanur-Karindalam Panchayath and the Health and Education drive in the tribal hamlet of Badiyadukka. He launched People’s Association for Non Formal Training and Education (PANTECH) in 1996 with an aim to help unemployed youth to acquire technical skills in an informal way and earn a living. The organisation, based in Kasargod district, has been organising training in more than 40 vocational trades and helped more than 5,000 people to earn a living. Now, PANTECH volunteers work among the sex workers as part of Kerala State Aids Control Society’s Suraksha Project. The organisation also associates with Childline besides implementing a project for the migrant labourers. Rahman is a columnist with leading evening dailies in Kasargod district, including Latest, Karaval and KVartha. He also contributes articles for leading newspapers in Kerala, including Deshabhimani and Madhyamam.

== Office-bearer ==
Rahman is currently the chairman of KANFED Social Forum and General Secretary of PANTECH. He is also serving as the Kasargod District Director for the Suraksha Project of the Kerala State Aids Control Society and the Childline Support Organisation.

== Major awards ==
1. 2002 – Acharya Vinoba Bhave National Volunteer Award, India Foundation and United Nations
2. 2003 – Kerala State Teacher’s Award, Department of Education, Government of Kerala
3. 2003 – Excellence Award, Labour India Publications

== Published books ==
1. Sex, Samooham, Samskaram (Malayalam), 2008, Tulunad Publications, Kanhangad
2. Poymiukhangalude Ullarakal (Malayalam), 2009, Tulunad Publications, Kanghangad
3. Sthree Rodanathinte Kanappurangal (Malayalam), 2013, Tulunad Publications, Kanhangad
