= Thrikaripur =

Thrikaripur Trikaripur
- Census Town
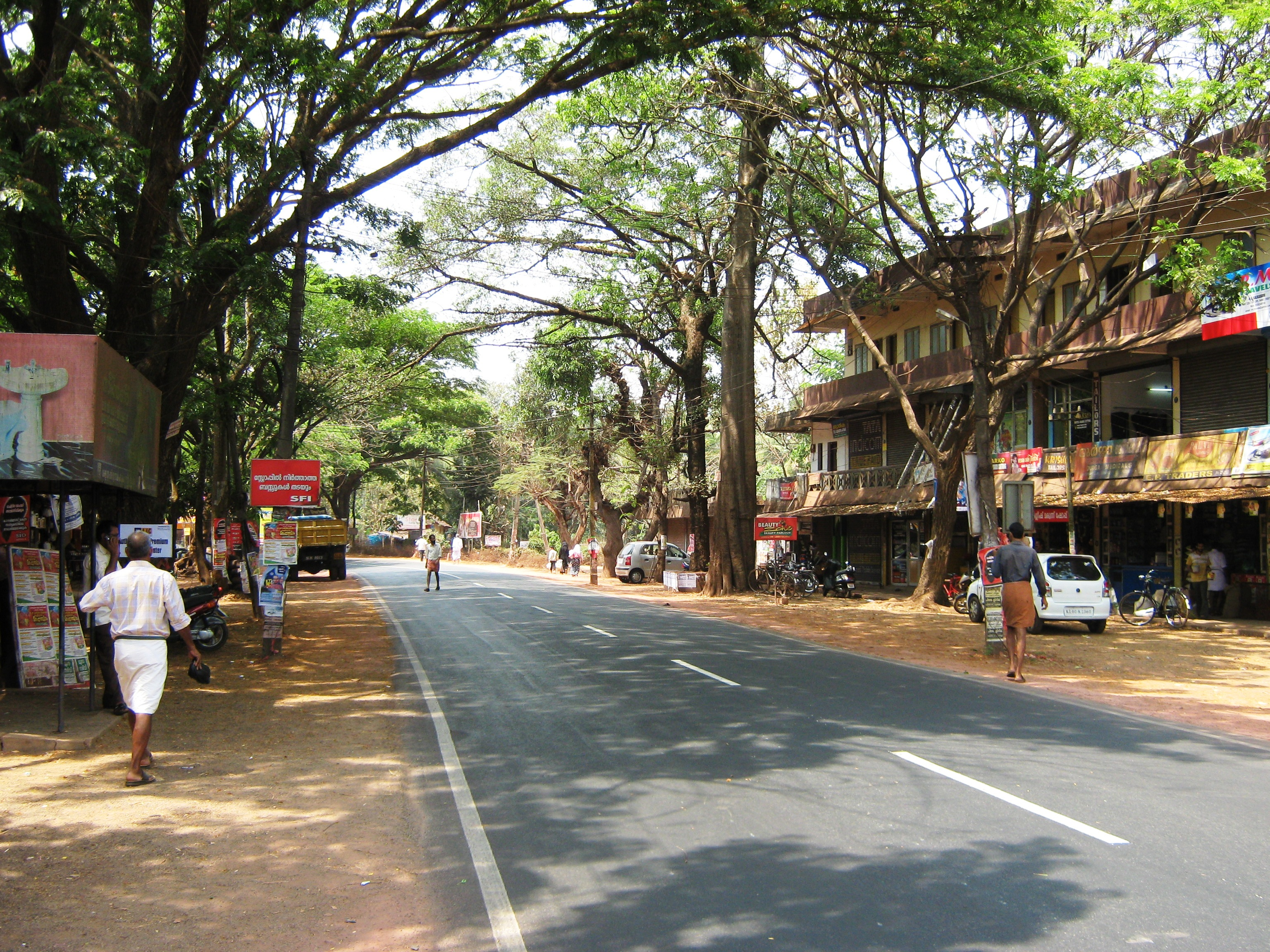
- Kallikkadavu Junction

- Location in Kerala, India Thrikaripur (India)
- Coordinates: 12°08′38″N 75°10′44″E
- Country: India
- State: Kerala
- District: Kasaragod
- Talukas: Hosdurg

Government
  - Type: Special grade panchayat
  - Body: Thrikaripur Grama Panchayat

Area
  - Total: 27.3 km^{2} (10.5 sq mi)

Population (2011)
  - Total: 41,201
  - Density: 1,510/km^{2} (3,910/sq mi)

Languages
  - Official: Malayalam, English
- Time zone: UTC+5:30 (IST)
- PIN: 671310
- Telephone code: 046722*****
- ISO 3166 code: IN-KL
- Vehicle registration: KL-14, KL-60
- Sex ratio: 1109 ♂/♀
- Literacy: 89.86%
- Lok Sabha constituency: Kasaragode
- Vidhan Sabha constituency: Thrikaripur
- Climate: pleasant (Köppen)
- Website: www.thrikaripur.com lsgkerala.in/trikaripurpanchayat/

Thrikaripur is a small town located in south part of Kasaragod District in the state of Kerala, India. Its southernmost end Olavara touches Payyannur, Kannur District.

== Demographics ==
The 2011 Census of India determined that the Trikaripur had a population of 41,201.

== Geography ==
Thrikaripur lies along the coast of Arabian Sea, at 12.15°N 75.15°E This Panchayat serves as the separating border for Kasaragod District and Kannur District.

== Educational Institutions ==
=== Colleges ===
- Rajiv Gandhi Institute of Pharmacy
- Trikaripur Arts & Science College (TASC)
- SMMKT School of Information Technology & Commerce (SMMKT SITC)

== Places of worship ==
- Sri Chakrapani Temple, Thrikaripur, temple dedicated to Vishnu.

== Notable people ==
- Arya (Jamshad Cethirakath)
- Asif Kottayil
- Muhammed Rafi
- Muttah Suresh
- Sathya (Shahir Cethirakath)

== See also ==
- Payyannur 8 km from Thrikaripur
- Peringome 21 km from Payyanur
- Ezhimala 12 km from Payyanur
- Kunhimangalam 5 km from Payyanur
- Kavvayi Island 3 km from Payyanur
- Koyonkara
- Ramanthali 7 km from Payyanur
- Karivellur 10 km from Payyanur
- Pilathara 7 km from Payyanur
- Mettammal
