= T. I. Madhusoodanan =

Indian politician

Member of the Kerala Legislative Assembly for Payyanur
- In office 24 May 2021 – 21 May 2026

Personal details
- Born: Payyanur
- Education: Payyanur College

T. I. Madhusoodanan is an Indian politician belonging to the CPI(M) who served as the MLA of the Payyanur constituency from May 2021 to May 2026. With a vote percentage of 62.49%, Madhusoodanan won the election with the highest vote percentage in the Kerala Assembly Elections, 2021. In the 2026 Kerala Legislative Assembly election, Madhusoodanan lost to UDF-backed rebel candidate V. Kunhikrishnan by a margin of 7,487 votes, marking the first defeat of the LDF in the Payyanur constituency.
