= Payyanur =

- Municipality
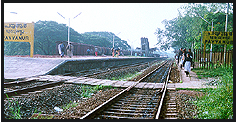
- Payyanur Railway Station

- Location in Kerala, India Payyanur (India)
- Coordinates: 12.1076100°N 75.1943590°E
- State: Kerala
- District: Kannur
- Taluk: Payyanur
- Municipality: 1990

Government
  - Type: Grade 1 Municipality
  - Body: Payyanur Municipality
  - Municipal chairman: Adv. Sareen Sasi
  - MLA: V. Kunhikrishnan
  - Deputy Superintendent of Police: Vinod Kumar K

Area
  - Total: 54.63 km^{2} (21.09 sq mi)
- Elevation: 14 m (46 ft)

Population (2011)
  - Total: 72,111
  - Rank: 16th in Kerala
  - Density: 1,320/km^{2} (3,419/sq mi)

Languages
  - Official: Malayalam, English
- Time zone: UTC+5:30 (IST)
- PIN: 670307
- Telephone code: +91 4985
- ISO 3166 code: IN-KL
- Vehicle registration: KL-86
- Nearest city: Kannur (36 km)
- Sex ratio: 1159 ♂/♀
- Literacy: 94.08%
- Assembly constituency: Payyanur
- Lok Sabha constituency: Kasaragod
- Website: payyanurmunicipality.lsgkerala.gov.in/en

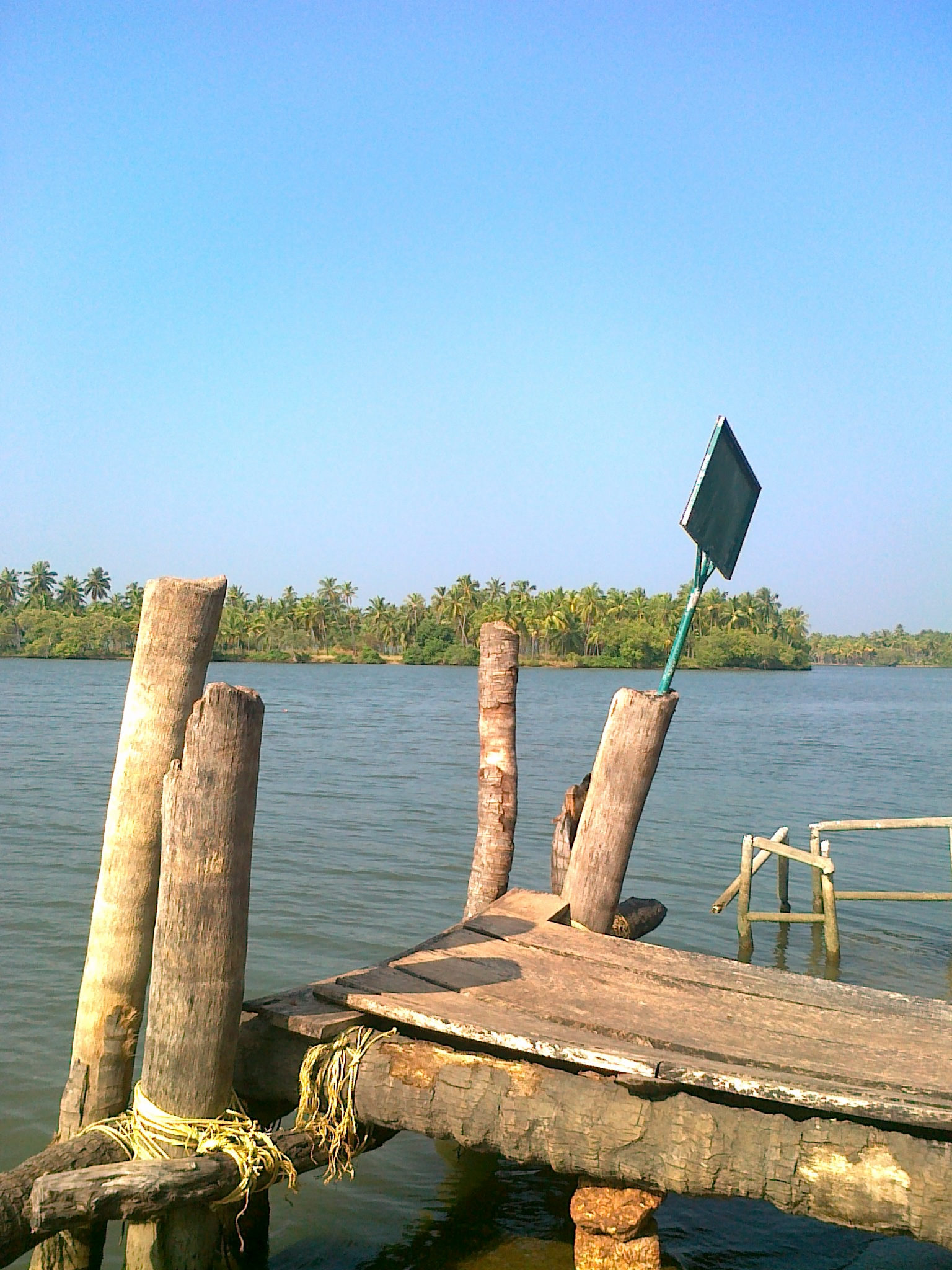
Backwaters in Payyannur

Payyanur (Malayalam: [pɐjːɐnːuːr]) is a municipal town and a taluk, a sub-district administrative unit, in the Kannur district of Kerala, India. Payyanur is the first municipality in Kerala to establish libraries in all its wards. On 10 March 2018, Kerala Chief Minister Pinarayi Vijayan inaugurated Payyanur as the fifth taluk in the district. Payyanur taluk comprises 22 villages including 16 de-linked from the Taliparamba taluk and six from the Kannur taluk. The town is situated on the banks of the Perumba River.

== Location ==
Payyanur town lies on NH 66 in the coastal plains of Kannur district. It is located approximately 36 km (22 mi) north of the district headquarters Kannur via Pilathara–Pappinisseri road and 56 km (35 mi) south of Kasaragod. The Payyanur–Rajagiri major district road and Payyanur–Mathamangalam road serve as major routes to the midland and highland regions bordering Western Ghats of the district. The town lies by the side of three rivers - Perumba River, Punnakka river (Payyanur river) and Kavvayi river (Thattar river).

== Demographics ==
Religions in Payyanur Municipality(2011)
Religion	Percent(%)
Hindu	80.06%
Muslim	17.52%
Christian	2.22%
Sikh	0.00%
Buddhist	0.02%
Jain	0.00%
Unclassified	0.03%
Not stated	0.14%

As of 2011 census, Payyanur had a population of 72,111, with males constituting 46% of the population and females 54%. Payyanur has an average literacy rate of 94.08%. This is higher than the state average of 94.00%. Male literacy is 97.02%, and female literacy is 91.60%. In Payyanur, 10% of the population is under 6 years of age.

== Etymology ==
Payyan is an appellation of the Hindu deity Kartikeya and ooru means town or place. Thus Payyanur means the land of Lord Kartikeya derived from the presence of the Sri Subramany Swamy temple here.

During the Renaissance era, Payyanur was known to English sailors as Delyn, named after the nearby hill of Ezhimala.

== Geography ==
Payyanur is located at coordinates 12.1°N 75.2°E. It has an average elevation of 16 metres (51 feet).

== History ==
Payyanur is one of several extant ancient civilized places in Kerala. The northern town of Kerala claims a rich recorded history. The archaeological remains excavated from Payyanur and nearby places prove the existence of a city in this area centuries ago.

The earliest known mention of this town is in the Brahmanda Purana, when Garga Muni talks about this place to the Pandavas during their exile.

Several notable travelers have described this area in their writings. Ibn Battuta visited Ezhimala in AD 1342 and wrote about the large seaport and the Chinese ships anchored here. Abul Fida in AD 1273, Marco Polo in AD 1293, the Italian explorer Niccolò de' Conti in the 15th century and the Portuguese scholar and traveler Barbosa all visited this place and gave extensive accounts of Ezhimala port, which was then known as "Heli". The scholar and author Hermann Gundert and William Logan, the Malabar District Collector during the British Colonial rule, who wrote Malabar Manual, also visited Payyanur and studied the rich heritage of the area.

Centuries back, Payyanur was a part of the Ezhimala/Mushika/Kolathiri Kingdom.Book named Mushikavamsha written by Atula mention this place. King Nandan was well known as a great warrior and ruler. The books written during the Sangam period describe the area and King. Ezhimala was also under the rule of the Cheras. A famous ruler there was Pazhassi Raja.

Payyanur Pattu, the ballad written by an unknown person belonging to the Chettiar community sometime during the 13th or 14th century, was set here.

=== Evolution of Payyanur ===
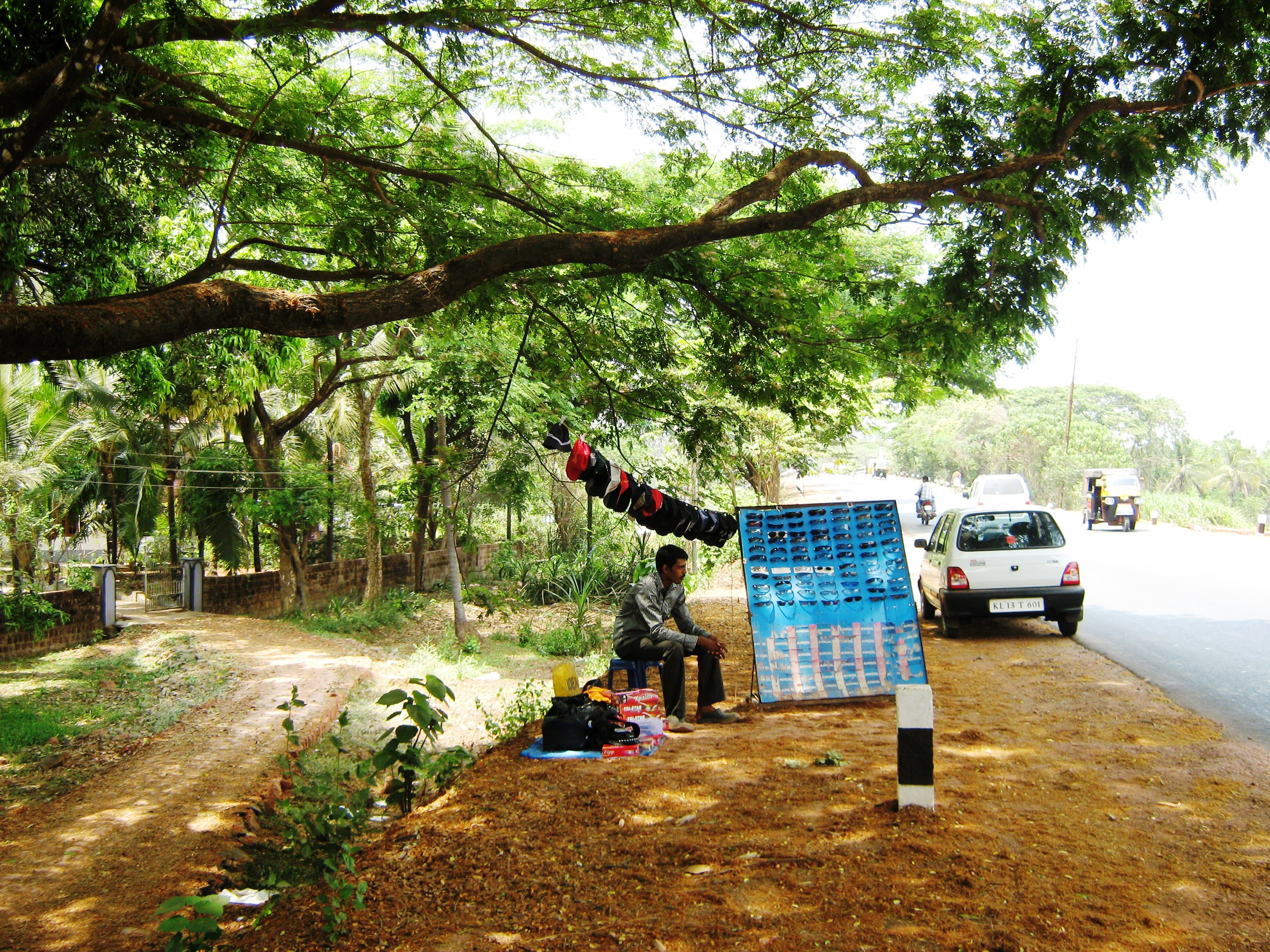
Payyannur Highway

In the past, the city of Kachil Patanam (presently Kavvayi) was the main town due to the proximity of waterways through Kavvayi River and its large seaport. It was both the administrative and business center during that time. According to historians, the ships from China and other countries used to visit this port and were anchored in the nearby river Changoorichal. Kavvayi retained its position during the rule of British East India Company also. They established the first Magistrate's court and Registrar's Office in Kavvayi.

Later, Kokkanisseri became the city center. The main road, which starts from Perumba in the east, up to old post office in the west and Kunhimangalam Mana in the south to government hospital in the north is called Kokkanisseri. The south of this town was called Payyanur village and the north of Kokkanisseri is called Moorikkovval village. The business center was called Kokkanisseri Bazaar. Later, the name Payyanur became common and thus the developed city of today came into existence.

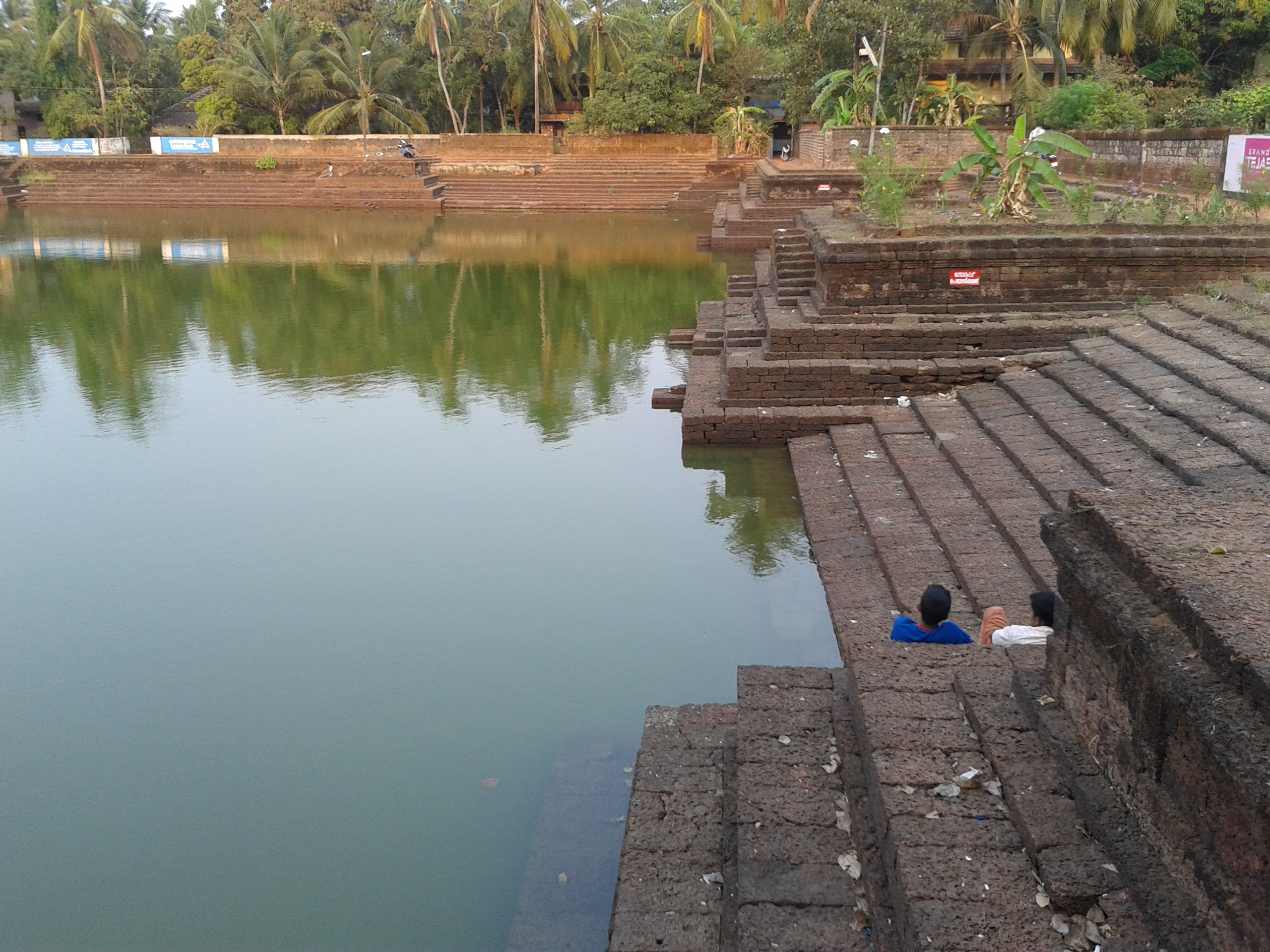
Subrahmanya swamy Temple pond Kokannisseri Kannangattu Temple Pond

During the regime of the Kolathiri Dynasty, Payyanur was a part of Kolathu Nadu, ruled by the Kolathiri Rajas based in Chirakkal near Kannur. During British rule, Payyanur was considered as a "farka" which in turn is a part of the Chirakkal Taluk. Until the formation of Kerala State in 1957, Payyanur remained in the Malabar District of the Madras State.

== Education ==
Colleges in Payyanur

- Ampere Institute of Engineering and Private ITI.
- AWH- al-badar special college Payyanur. Department of psychology
- College of Engineering and Technology, Payyanur
- Govt. Residential women's polytechnic college Payyanur
- Gurudev Arts & Science College, Mathil
- NEST College Payyannur
- Payyanur College, Edat.
- Sree Narayana Guru College of Engineering & Technology.
- Sree Sankaracharya University of Sanskrit Regional Centre, Payyanur
- Swami Anandatheertha Campus, Payyanur

== Hospitals ==
- Baby Memorial Hospital
- Govt HQ Taluk Hospital
- BKM Memorial Hospital
- Payyanur Co-operative Hospital
- Mukunda Hospital
- Saba Hospital
- Payyanur Eye Foundation
- Meenakshiamma Memorial Hospital
- Dr. VC Nayanar Memorial Hospital
- Priyadarshini Hospital

== Administration ==
Payyanur Taluk is one among the five taluks in Kannur district which has administration over 22 villages.

Payyanur Municipality is divided into 46 wards covering an area of 54.63 km^{2} (21.09 sq mi) for which the elections are held every five years. The current ruling party is CPI(M).

Payyanur Assembly constituency is part of Kasaragod Loksabha constituency. The current Payyanur MLA is V. Kunhikrishnan

== Law and Order ==
The municipality comes under the jurisdiction of Payyanur police station, established on 13 January 1881 during the British Raj.

Payyanur is also headquarters of one among the four sub divisions in Kannur rural police district formed on 18.02.2021. It is situated about 500 m west of National Highway 66. The sub division has jurisdiction over five police stations and one control room viz Payyanur, Pazhayangadi, Pariyaram medical college, Peringome and Cherupuzha. Indian Naval Academy at Ezhimala and Central Reserve Police Force Training Camp near Peringome, Pariyaram Govt Medical college and Govt Ayurveda Medical college are situated in Payyanur subdivdison limit.

Court complexes in Payyanur

- Sub Court, Payyanur
- Commercial Court, Payyanur
- Munsiff Court, Payyanur
- Judicial First Class Magistrate Court, Payyanur

== Transportation ==
The National Highway 66 passes through Perumba junction. Goa and Mumbai can be accessed on the northern side and Cochin and Thiruvananthapuram can be accessed on the southern side. National Highway 66 is given node for construction of 6 lane road on Payyanur and other stretches of Kerala.

Payyanur has several private and KSRTC buses plying places inside and outside the district. Payyanur is well-connected to its suburbs through several bus services. Payyanur town has three bus terminals — KSRTC Bus terminal, Payyanur on NH-66 road, Old Bus Stand, Payyanur and New Bus Stand, Payyanur on the Main road, Payyanur.

Payyanur is one of the major station that lies in the Shoranur-Mangalore Section of Southern Railway and comes under A category stations under Palakkad division. The station has 3 platforms and 4 tracks.

The nearest Airport Kannur is 57 km (35 mi) away and Mangalore of 115 km (71 mi) away.

== Social Service ==
Orator and freedom fighter KP Kunhirama Poduval, who founded Sanjayan Smaraka Grandhalayam at Annur (Sanjayan Memorial Library), is from here. Kelappan Service Center (perhaps the only institution built in memory of K Kelappan, also known as "Kerala Gandhi") and Payyanur Co-operative Stores are among a number of social organizations in the area.

== Culture ==
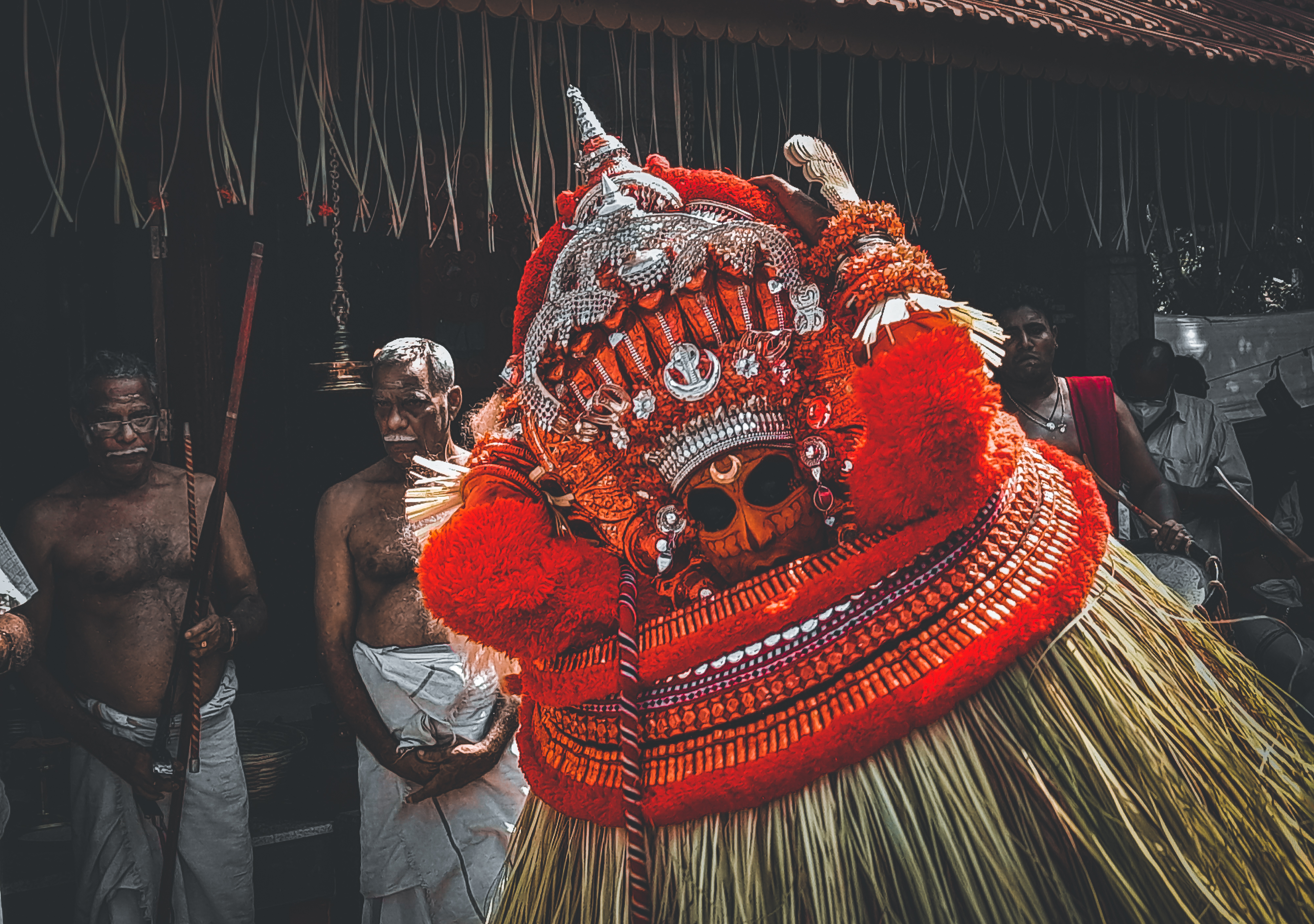
Vishnumoorthi Theyyam at Payyannur Bali Theyyam

A Masjid at Payyanur

Theyyam and religious festivals (Kaliyattam) of various temples attract people to Payyanur. Poorakkali and Kolkali are the major traditional dance ritual performances. Architect Kunhimangalam Narayanan, dancer Vannadil Pudiyaveettil Dhananjayan, and the Sanskrit scholar E. Sreedharan are all from the area. The native place of legendary Kathakali master Kalamandalam Krishnan Nair is not far from this town. Kandoth in Payyanur is famous for pottery. The weaver's streets of various villages around Payyanur contribute to the fame of the handlooms of Kannur.

=== Pavithra Mothiram ===
Payyanur Pavithram, or Pavithra Mothiram is a particular ring worn during performing Vedic or holy rituals or during the "pithrubali" (ceremony performed for the well-being of the ancestors or departed souls) in the Hindu tradition. The traditional Pavitram is usually made of dharba grass. The formation of Payyanur Pavitram is closely related to Payyanur Sree Subrahmanya Swami Temple.

== Notable people ==
=== Film and media ===
- Harimurali, film actor
- Madhu Kaithapram, film director
- V. P. Krishnakumar, award-winning sound engineer
- Mohan Kupleri, film director
- Santhosh Mada, film maker
- Anuraj Manohar, film director
- K. U. Mohanan, cinematographer
- Malavika Mohanan, film actress
- Parvathy Nambiar, film actress
- Kaithapram Damodaran Namboothiri, lyricist
- Kaithapram Viswanathan Namboothiri, music director
- K. Padmanabhan Nair, film director
- Unnikrishnan Namboothiri, film actor
- Chidambaram S. Poduval, film director
- Ganapathi S. Poduval, film actor
- Ratheesh Balakrishnan Poduval, film director
- Abhiram Radhakrishnan, film actor
- Anaswara Rajan, film actress
- Subeesh Sudhi, film actor

=== Politics & law ===
- T. Govindan, politician
- C. Krishnan, politician
- P. V. Kunhikrishnan, judge of Kerala High Court
- V. Kunhikrishnan, politician
- T. I. Madhusoodanan, politician
- V. P. Appukutta Poduval, freedom fighter
- K. C. Venugopal, politician
- M. Vijin, politician

=== Science ===
- V. P. Balagangadharan, space scientist
- Felix Bast, phycologist
- P. Kunhikrishnan, space scientist

=== Writers ===
- C. V. Balakrishnan, writer
- Payyannur Kunhiraman, writer
- Karivellur Murali, poet and lyricist
- Satheesh Babu Payyannur, writer
- E. V. Ramakrishnan, writer and poet
- Sudhakaran Ramanthali, writer
- A. C. Sreehari, writer

=== Miscellaneous ===
- Dhananjayans, classical dancers- Padma awardee
- M. V. Vishnu Namboothiri, folklore researcher
- Kookkanam Rahman, social worker and writer
- Nawab Rajendran, social activist and journalist
- Sahal Abdul Samad, professional footballer

== See also ==
- Kavvayi Island, 3 km from Payyannur
- Kandankali
- Valiyaparamba Backwaters, 15 km from Payyannur
- Kunhimangalam village, 8 km from Payyannur town
