= North Malabar =

Geographical and historical region

- Geographical and historical area
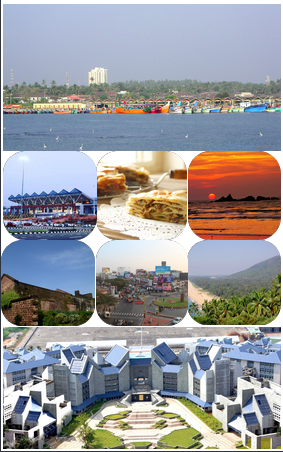
- Clockwise from top: Mappila Bay harbour, Muzhappilangad Beach, Ezhimala, Indian Naval Academy, St. Angelo Fort, Kannur International Airport, Thalassery cuisine, Caltex Junction (South Bazar)
- Interactive map of North Malabar
- Coordinates: 11°45′N 75°30′E
- Country: India
- State: Kerala; Puducherry

Government
  - Body: Northern Range, Kerala; Mahé Sub-Division, Puducherry

Area
  - Total: 4,200 km^{2} (1,600 sq mi)

Population (2001)(approx.)
  - Total: 4,800,000
  - Density: 819/km^{2} (2,120/sq mi)

Languages
  - Official: Malayalam
- Time zone: UTC+5:30 (IST)
- PIN: 670***, 671*** and 673***
- ISO 3166 code: IN-KL
- Vehicle registration: KL-13, KL-14, KL-18, KL-56, KL-58, KL-59, KL-60, KL-72, KL-77, KL-78, KL-79, KL-86 & PY-03
- Literacy: 94.52%%
- Vidhan Sabha constituency: 24
- Civic agency: Northern Range, Kerala; Mahé Sub-Division, Puducherry

North Malabar refers to the geographic area of southwest India covering the state of Kerala's present day Kasaragod and Kannur districts, Mananthavady taluk of the Wayanad district, the taluks of Vatakara and Koyilandy in the Kozhikode district, and the entire Mahe district of the Puducherry UT. The Korapuzha River or Elathur River in north Kozhikode serves as the border separating North and South Malabar. Manjeswaram marks the northern border between North Malabar and Dakshina Kannada.

The North Malabar region is bounded by Dakshina Kannada (Mangalore) to north, the hilly regions of Kodagu and Mysore Plateau to east, South Malabar (Korapuzha) to south, and Arabian Sea to west. The greater part of North Malabar (except Mahé) remained as one of the two administrative divisions of the Malabar District (an administrative district of British India under the Madras Presidency) until 1947 and later became part of India's Madras State until 1956. Mahé remained under French jurisdiction until 13 June 1954. On 1 November 1956, the state of Kerala was formed by the States Reorganisation Act, which merged the Malabar District with Travancore-Cochin apart from the four southern taluks, which were merged with Tamil Nadu, and the Kasaragod taluk of South Kanara District. During British rule, North Malabar's chief importance laid in producing Thalassery pepper and coconuts.

North Malabar begins at Korapuzha in the south and ends at Manjeshwaram in the north of Kerala and traditionally comprises the erstwhile princely principalities and chiefdoms of Kolathu Nadu, Kingdom of Kottayam, Kadathanadu and southern part of Tulu Nadu. Wayanad, which forms a continuation of Mysore Plateau, was the only plateau in North Malabar as well as Kerala. Indian Naval Academy at Ezhimala is Asia's largest, and the world's third-largest, naval academy. Muzhappilangad beach is the longest drive-in beach in Asia and is featured among the top 6 best beaches for driving in the world. North Malabar is home to several forts which include Arikady Fort, Bekal Fort, Chandragiri Fort, Hosdurg Fort, St. Angelo Fort, and Tellicherry Fort. Bekal Fort is the largest fort in Kerala.

== Etymology ==
Until the arrival of British, the term Malabar was used in foreign trade circles as a general name for Kerala. Earlier, the term Malabar had also been used to denote Tulu Nadu and Kanyakumari which lie contiguous to Kerala in the southwestern coast of India, in addition to the modern state of Kerala. The people of Malabar were known as Malabars. Still the term Malabar is often used to denote the entire southwestern coast of India. From the time of Cosmas Indicopleustes (6th century CE) itself, the Arab sailors used to call Kerala as Male. The first element of the name, however, is attested already in the Topography written by Cosmas Indicopleustes. This mentions a pepper emporium called Male, which clearly gave its name to Malabar ('the country of Male'). The name Male is thought to come from the Dravidian word Mala ('hill'). Al-Biruni (AD 973 - 1048) must have been the first writer to call this state Malabar. Authors such as Ibn Khordadbeh and Al-Baladhuri mention Malabar ports in their works. The Arab writers had called this place Malibar, Manibar, Mulibar, and Munibar. Malabar is reminiscent of the word Malanad which means the land of hills. According to William Logan, the word Malabar comes from a combination of the Dravidian word Mala (hill) and the Persian/Arabic word Barr (country/continent).

== History ==
=== Ezhimala kingdom ===
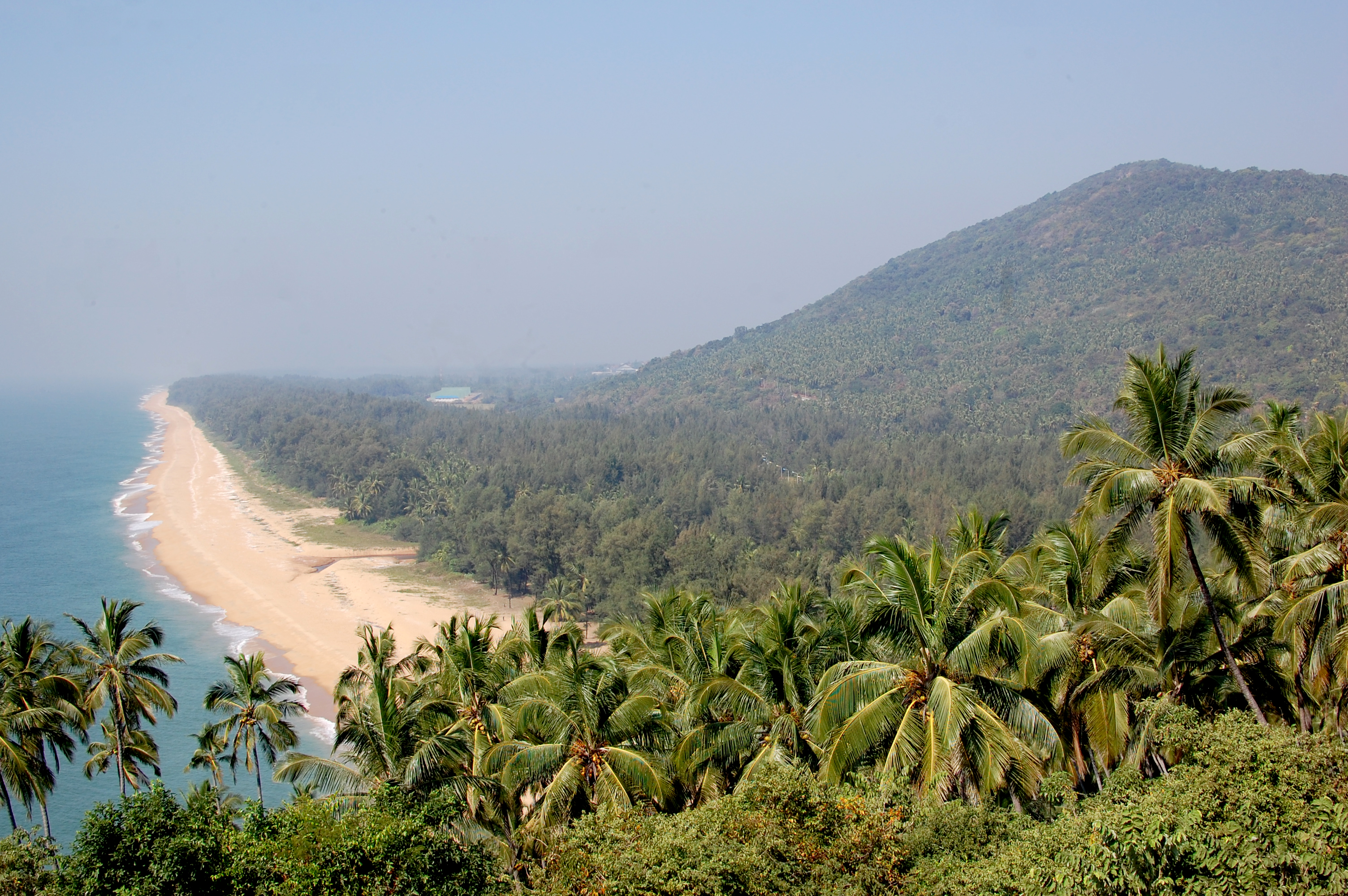
Ezhimala was once the headquarters of a powerful ancient kingdom.

The ancient port of Naura, which is mentioned in the Periplus of the Erythraean Sea as a port somewhere north of Muziris is identified with Kannur.

Pliny the Elder (1st century CE) states that the port of Tyndis was located at the northwestern border of Keprobotos (Chera dynasty). The North Malabar region, which lies north of the port at Tyndis, was ruled by the kingdom of Ezhimala during Sangam period. According to the Periplus of the Erythraean Sea, a region known as Limyrike began at Naura and Tyndis. However the Ptolemy mentions only Tyndis as the Limyrike's starting point. The region probably ended at Kanyakumari; it thus roughly corresponds to the present-day Malabar Coast. The value of Rome's annual trade with the region was estimated at around 50,000,000 sesterces. Pliny the Elder mentioned that Limyrike was prone by pirates. The Cosmas Indicopleustes mentioned that the Limyrike was a source of peppers.

The Ezhimala dynasty had jurisdiction over two Nadus - The coastal Poozhinadu and the hilly eastern Karkanadu. According to the works of Sangam literature, Poozhinadu consisted much of the coastal belt between Mangalore and Kozhikode. Karkanadu consisted of Wayanad-Gudalur hilly region with parts of Kodagu (Coorg). It is said that Nannan, the most renowned ruler of Ezhimala dynasty, took refuge at Wayanad hills in the 5th century CE when he was lost to Cheras, just before his execution in a battle, according to the Sangam works. Ezhimala kingdom was succeeded by Mushika dynasty in the early medieval period, most possibly due to the migration of Tuluva Brahmins from Tulu Nadu. The Kolathunadu (Kannur) Kingdom at the peak of its power, reportedly extended from Netravati River (Mangalore) in the north to Korapuzha (Kozhikode) in the south with Arabian Sea on the west and Kodagu hills on the eastern boundary, also including the isolated islands of Lakshadweep in the Arabian Sea.

North Malabar was a hub of Indian Ocean trade during the era. According to Kerala Muslim tradition, the kingdom of Ezhimala was home to several oldest mosques in the Indian subcontinent. According to the Legend of Cheraman Perumals, the first Indian mosque was built in 624 AD at Kodungallur with the mandate of the last the ruler (the Cheraman Perumal) of Chera dynasty, who left from Dharmadom to Mecca and converted to Islam during the lifetime of Muhammad (c. 570–632). According to Qissat Shakarwati Farmad, the Masjids at Kodungallur, Kollam, Madayi, Barkur, Mangalore, Kasaragod, Kannur, Dharmadam, Panthalayani, and Chaliyam, were built during the era of Malik Dinar, and they are among the oldest Masjids in the Indian subcontinent. It is believed that Malik Dinar died at Thalangara in Kasaragod town. Most of them lies in the erstwhile region of Ezhimala kingdom. The Koyilandy Jumu'ah Mosque contains an Old Malayalam inscription written in a mixture of Vatteluttu and Grantha scripts which dates back to the 10th century CE. It is a rare surviving document recording patronage by a Hindu king (Bhaskara Ravi) to the Muslims of Kerala.

=== Mushika dynasty ===
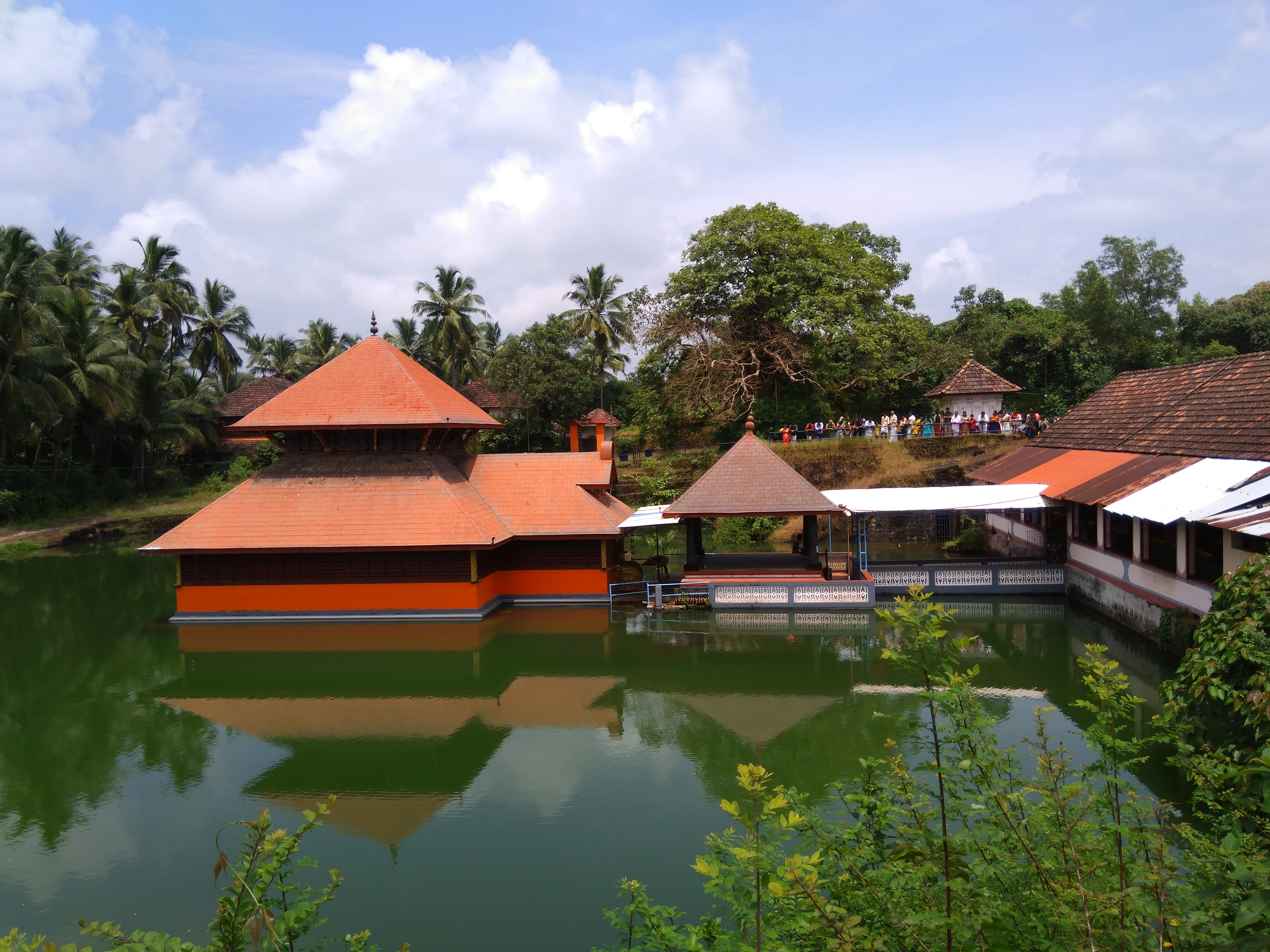
Ananthapadmanabhaswamy temple at Ananthapura, Kumbla

Between the 9th and 12th centuries, a dynasty called "Mushaka" controlled the Chirakkal areas of northern Malabar (the Wynad-Tellichery area was part of the Second Chera Kingdom). The Mushakas were probably the descendants of the ancient royal family of Nannan of Ezhi mala and were perhaps a vassal of the Cheras. The Kolla-desam (or the Mushika-rajya) came under the influence of the Chera/Perumals kingdom during eleventh century AD. The Chola references to several kings in medieval Kerala confirms that the power of the Chera/Perumal was restricted to the country around capital Kodungallur. The Perumal kingship remained nominal compared with the power that local rulers (such as that of the Mushika in the north and Venatu in the south) exercised politically and militarily. Medieval Kolla-desam stretched on the banks of Kavvai, Koppam and Valappattanam rivers. An Old Malayalam inscription (Ramanthali inscriptions), dated to 1075 CE, mentioning king Kunda Alupa, the ruler of Alupa dynasty of Mangalore, can be found at Ezhimala (the former headquarters of Mushika dynasty) near Cannanore, Kerala. The Arabic inscription on a copper slab within the Madayi Mosque in Kannur records its foundation year as 1124 CE. In his book on travels (Il Milione), Marco Polo recounts his visit to the area in the mid 1290s. Other visitors included Faxian, the Buddhist pilgrim and Ibn Batuta, writer and historian of Tangiers. The Mushika-vamsha Mahakavya, written by Athula in the 11th century, throws light on the recorded past of the Mushika royal family up until that point.

==== Old Malayalam inscriptions related to Mushika dynasty ====
- Validhara Vikkirama Rama (c. 929 AD) - mentioned in the Ezhimala-Narayankannur inscription.
- Kantan Karivarman alias Iramakuta Muvar (c. 1020 AD) - mentioned in an Eramam inscription of Chera/Perumal Bhaskara Ravi Manukuladitya (962–1021 AD).
- Mushikesvara Chemani/Jayamani (c. 1020 AD) - Tiruvadur inscription.
- Ramakuta Muvar (as a donor to the Tiruvalla temple in Tiruvalla Copper Plates/Huzur Treasury Plates).
- Utaiya-varma alias Ramakuta Muvar (early 12th century AD) - mentioned in the Kannapuram inscription.

Inscription	Location	Notes
Ramanthali/Ezhimala-Narayankannur inscription (929 AD)	Ramanthali, near Ezhimala.; A single granite slab in the courtyard of the Narayankannur Temple.	Mentions Mushika Validhara Vikrama Rama.; The so-called Agreement of Muzhikkulam is quoted in the record.; Merchant guild manigramam is appointed as the guardian of the Narayankannur Temple.; Mentions king Kunda Alupa, the ruler of Alupa dynasty of Mangalore.
Panthalayani Kollam inscription (973 AD)	Single stone slab in the upper frame of the srikoyil (central shrine) entrance in Tali temple.	Name of the king – probably Bhaskara Ravi Manukuladitya (962–1021 AD) – is built over by the present structure.
Koyilandy Jumu'ah Mosque inscription (10th century AD)	On the granite blocks built into the steps of the ablution tank of the Koyilandy Jumu'ah Mosque	A rare surviving document recording patronage by a Hindu king (Bhaskara Ravi) (961-1021 AD) to the Mappila Muslims of Kerala. It also mentions about a merchant guild.
Eramam inscription (1020 AD)	Eramam, near Payyanur.; A single slab in the site of the ruined Chalappuram Temple.	
Pullur Kodavalam inscription (1020 AD)	Pullur, near Kanhangad.	Engraved on a single stone slab in the courtyard of the Pullur Kodavalam Vishnu Temple; Mentions Chera/Perumal king Bhaskara Ravi Manukuladitya (962–1021 AD).; Identified king Manukuladitya with king Bhaskara Ravi.
Tiruvadur inscription (c. 1020 AD)	Partly in the courtyard of the temple on either side of the sopana.; Partly in the sanctum sanctorum of the temple.	Creation and endowment of a grama (Brahmin settlement) with members chosen from some old grama settlements from central Kerala (Vaikom, Paravur, Avittathoor, Irinjalakuda and Peruvanam).; The engraver is mentioned as Rama Jayamani, the "royal goldsmith of the Mushika king [Jayamani]".
Trichambaram inscription (c. 1040 AD)	Three blocks of granite on the base of the central shrine of the temple.	Mentions Chera/Perumal king Raja Raja (c. 1036–1089 AD).; Mentions Chera/Perumal king Bhaskara Ravi Manukuladitya (962–1021 AD) and Iramakuta Muvar Kantan Karivarman (Srikantha Kartha) (c.1020 AD).; Mentions the merchants guilds of Valanchiyar and Nanadeyar.; Mentions Rajendra Chola Samaya Senapati from Katappa Palli.
Maniyur inscription (c. 11th century)	Single stone slab outside the prakara (outer wall) of the temple.	Maniyur inscription Confirms the extension of the so-called Agreement of Muzhikkulam to Mushika country.
Kinalur inscription (c. 1083 CE)	Both sides of a single granite slab in site of the ruined (now lost) Kinalur Jain Temple near Kozhikode.; The estampage can be found in Government Epigraphist's Office, Mysore.	Mentions Arappan Kunchi, the chief of Kurumbranad.; Arappan Kunchi, the chief of Kurumbranad, donated lands to Kunavaynallur (Jain temple) and leased them out to Chathan Arukkadi of Tiruvanchikkalam, and Kuntan Chirunankai and Chathan Chirukanthan.; Manukulai-chekara-nallur (Jain temple) is mentioned.; Munnutruvar, the Three Hundred (probably the second Hundred of Kurumbranad), and Muvayiravar (the Three Thousand) are mentioned.
Panthalayani Kollam inscription (c. 1089 AD)	Single granite slab in the courtyard of the Panthalayani Kollam Bhagavati temple.; The record was destroyed.	Mentions Chera/Perumal king Rama Kulasekhara (1089–1122 AD).; The location given as "Kollathu Panthalayani".
Tiruvalla Copper Plates (Huzur Treasury Plates) (10th-11th centuries AD)	Tiruvalla	Presence of a Ramakuta Muvar (as a donor to the Tiruvalla temple).
Kannapuram inscription (beginning of the 12th century)	Single stone slab fixed on a platform outside the prakara (outer wall) of the Kannapuram temple.	Ramakuta Muvar Udaya Varma is mentioned.

=== Kolathunadu ===
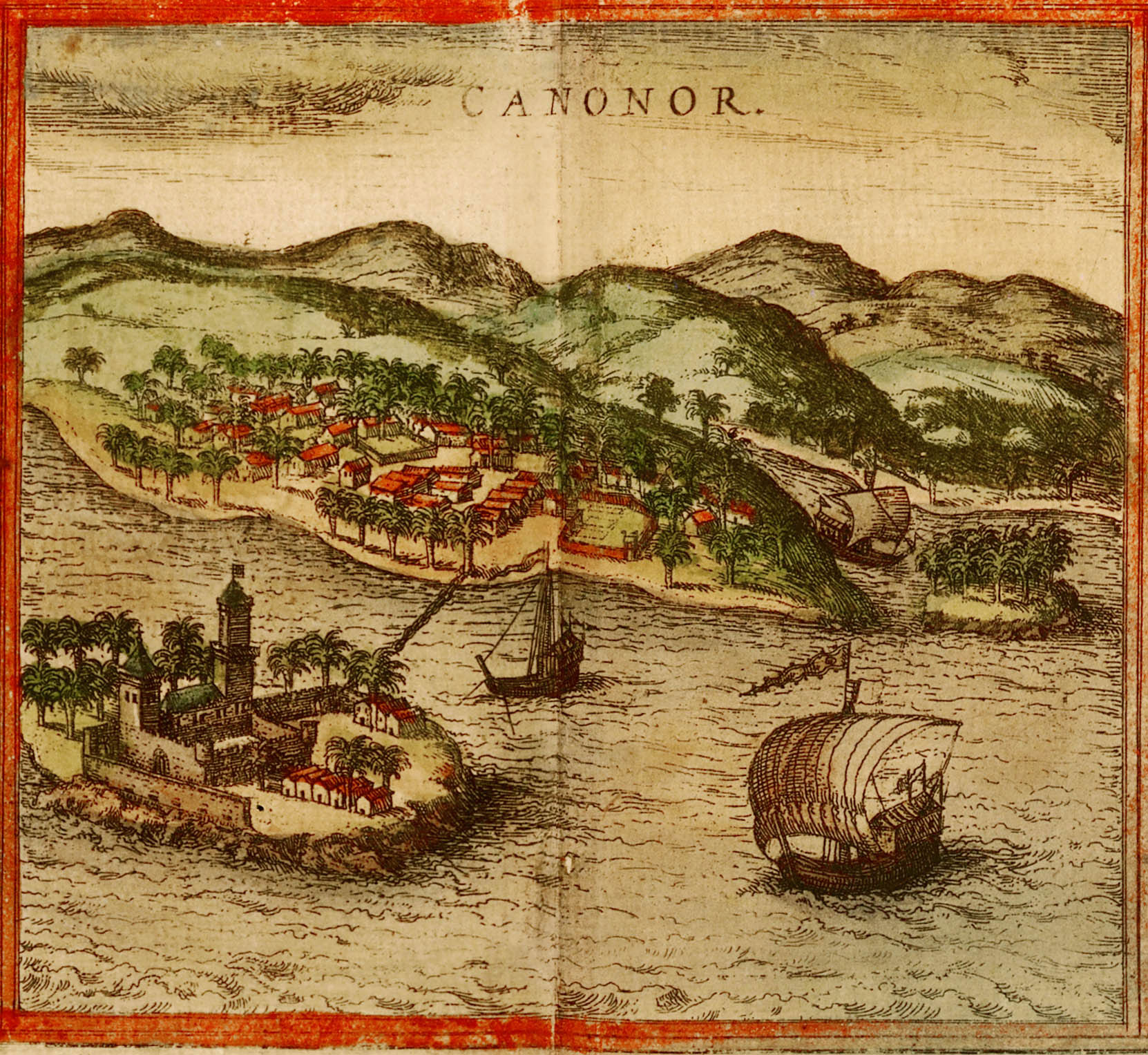
A portrait of Kannur drawn in 1572, from Georg Braun and Frans Hogenberg's atlas Civitates orbis terrarum, Volume I

Kolathunadu (Kingdom of Kannur) was one of the 4 most powerful kingdoms on the Malabar Coast during the arrival of Portuguese Armadas to India, the others being Zamorin, Kingdom of Cochin and Quilon. Kolattunādu had its capital at Ezhimala and was ruled by Kolattiri royal family and roughly comprised the North Malabar region of Kerala state in India. Traditionally, Kolattunādu is described as the land lying between Perumba river in the north and Putupattanam river in the south. The ruling house of Kolathunādu, also known as the Kolathiris, were descendants of the Mushaka royal family, (which was an ancient dynasty of kerala)and rose to become one of the major political powers in the Kerala region, after the disappearance of the Cheras of Mahodayapuram and the Pandyan dynasty in the 12th century AD. The Kolathiris trace their ancestry back to the ancient Mushika kingdom (Ezhimala kingdom, Eli-nadu) of the Tamil Sangam Age. The Indian anthropologist Ayinapalli Aiyappan states that a powerful and warlike clan of the Bunt community of Tulu Nadu was called Kola Bari and the Kolathiri Raja of Kolathunadu was a descendant of this clan.

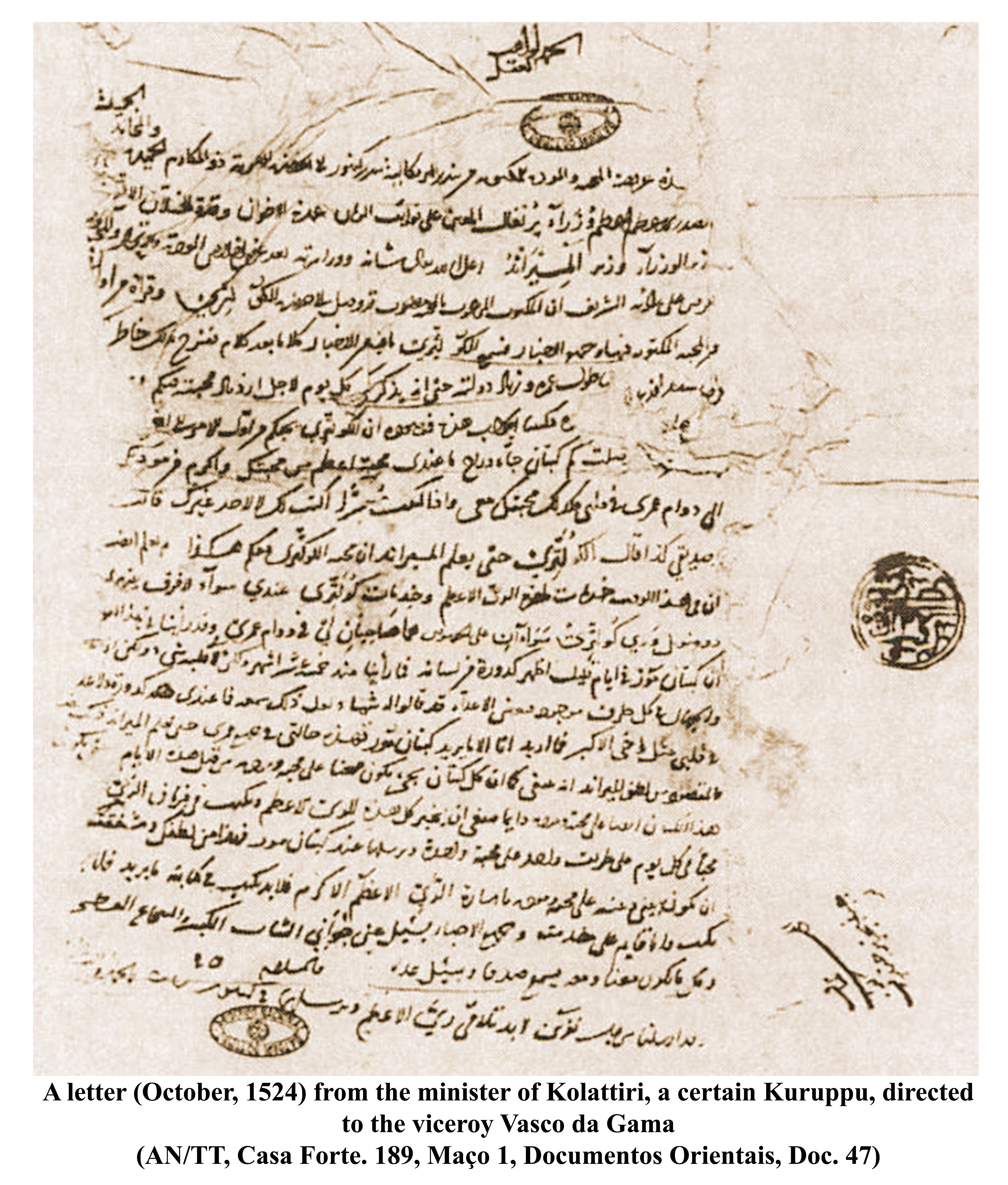
Kolattiri Raja's (the ruler of Kannur) minister Kuruppu's Arabic letter to Vasco da Gama (1524)

Until the 16th century CE, Kasargod town was known by the name Kanhirakode (may be by the meaning, 'The land of Kanhira Trees') in Malayalam. The Kumbla dynasty, who swayed over the land of southern Tulu Nadu wedged between Chandragiri River and Netravati River (including present-day Taluks of Manjeshwar and Kasaragod) from Maipady Palace at Kumbla, had also been vassals to the Kolathunadu, before the Carnatic conquests of Vijayanagara Empire. The Kumbla dynasty had a mixed lineage of Malayali Nairs and Tuluva Brahmins. They also claimed their origin from Cheraman Perumals of Kerala. Francis Buchanan-Hamilton states that the customs of Kumbla dynasty were similar to those of the contemporary Malayali kings, though Kumbla was considered as the southernmost region of Tulu Nadu.

The Zamorin of Calicut, who was actually the ruler of South Malabar and became the most powerful ruler on Malabar Coast, conquered many regions of North Malabar including Koyilandy (Panthalayini Kollam). By the 15th century CE, Kolathiri Rajas came under the influence of Zamorin just like the other kingdoms of Kerala. The Kolathiri Dominion emerged into independent 10 principalities i.e., Kadathanadu (Vadakara), Randathara or Poyanad (Dharmadom), Kottayam (Thalassery), Nileshwaram, Iruvazhinadu (Panoor), Kurumbranad etc., under separate royal chieftains due to the outcome of internal dissensions. The Nileshwaram dynasty on the northernmost part of Kolathiri dominion, were relatives to both Kolathunadu as well as Zamorin of Calicut, in the early medieval period. The Portuguese arrived at Kappad Kozhikode in 1498 during the Age of Discovery, thus opening a direct sea route from Europe to South Asia. The St. Angelo Fort at Kannur was built in 1505 by Dom Francisco de Almeida, the first Portuguese Viceroy of India. The Dutch captured the fort from the Portuguese in 1663. They modernized the fort and built the bastions Hollandia, Zeelandia, and Frieslandia that are the major features of the present structure. The original Portuguese fort was pulled down later. A painting of this fort and the fishing ferry behind it can be seen in the Rijksmuseum Amsterdam. The Dutch sold the fort to king Ali Raja of Arakkal in 1772.

During the 17th century, Kannur was the capital city of the only Muslim Sultanate in Kerala, known as Arakkal, who also ruled the Laccadive Islands in addition to Kannur. The island of Dharmadom near Kannur, along with Thalassery, was ceded to the East India Company as early as 1734, which were claimed by all of the Kolattu Rajas, Kottayam Rajas, and Arakkal Bibi in the late medieval period, where the British initiated a factory and English settlement following the cession.

=== Colonial era ===
Malabar District during 1951 Census

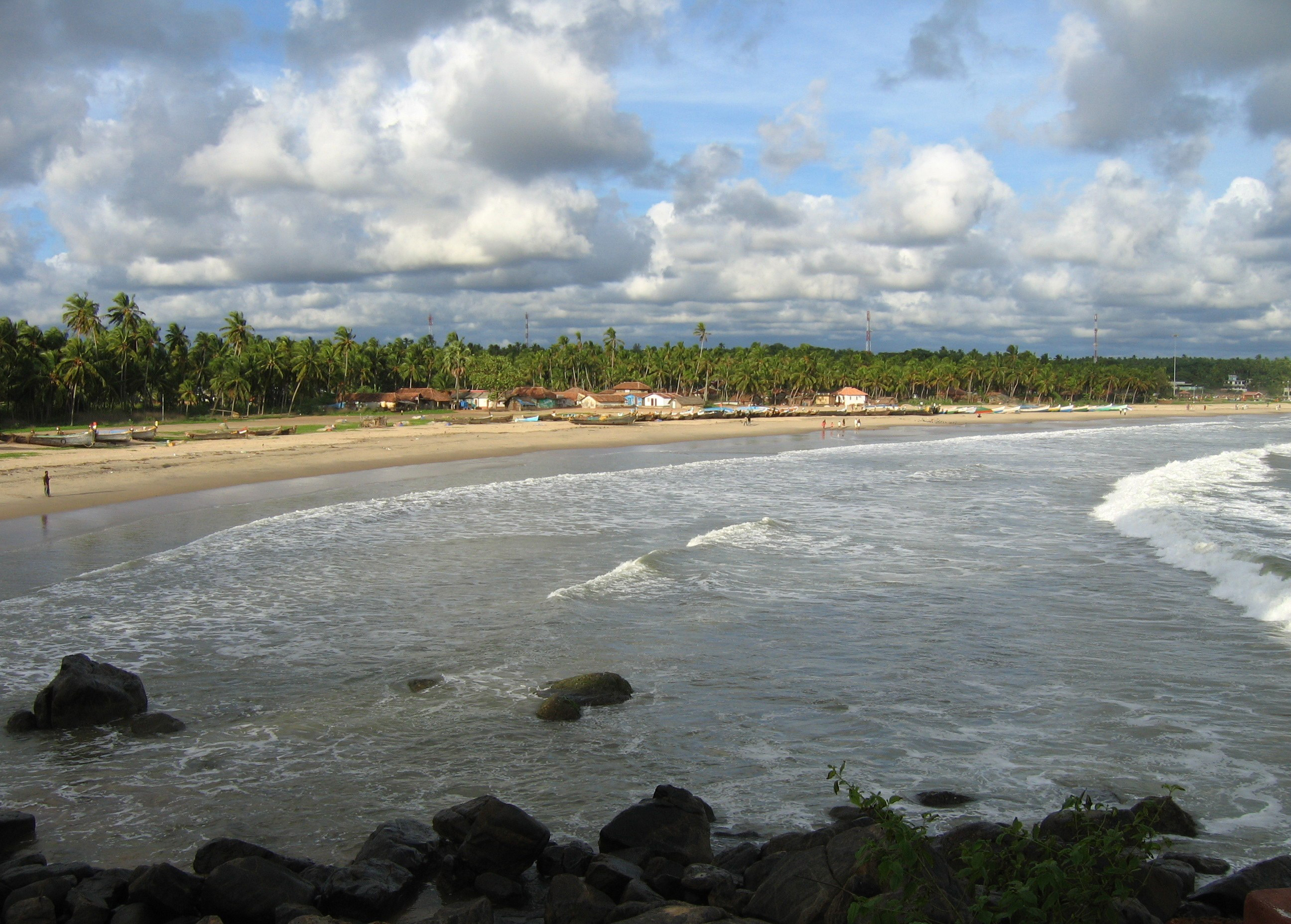
A view of Bekal Fort at Kasaragod built in 1650 CE, which is also the largest fort in Kerala

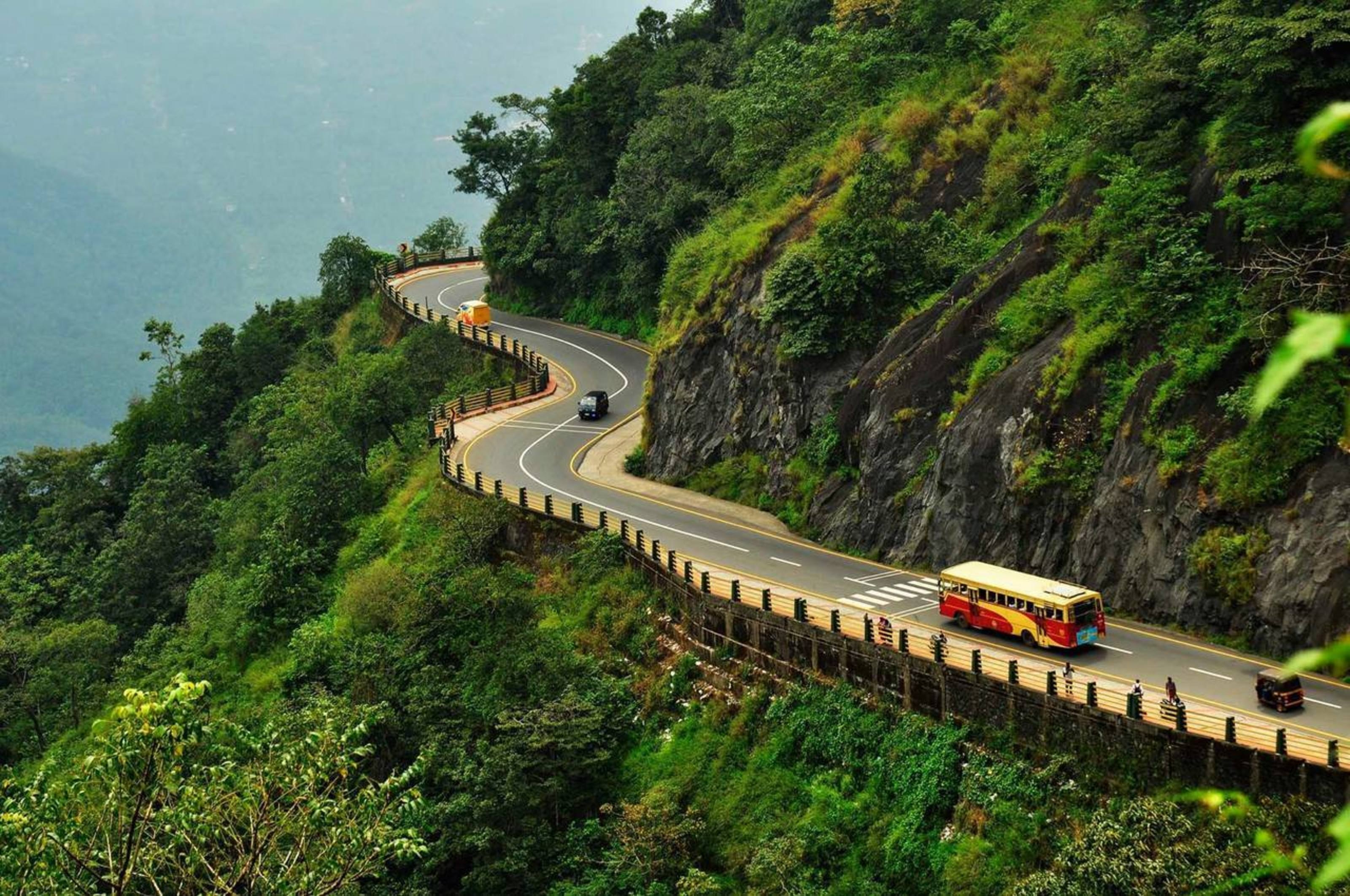
Thamarassery Churam was laid in the 18th century by Tipu Sultan, the ruler of Mysore.

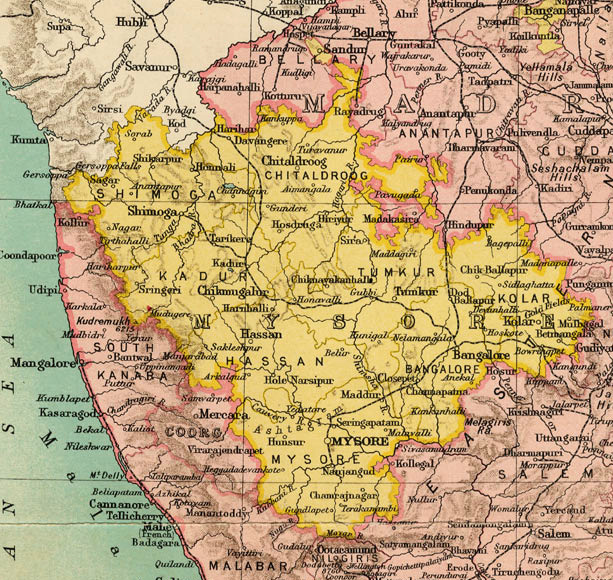
North Malabar in 1909 (the southwestern region)

In 1761, the British captured Mahé, and the settlement was handed over to the ruler of Kadathanadu. The British restored Mahé to the French as a part of the 1763 Treaty of Paris. In 1779, the Anglo-French war broke out, resulting in the French loss of Mahé. In 1783, the British agreed to restore to the French their settlements in India, and Mahé was handed over to the French in 1785.

The northern parts of Kerala was unified under Tipu Sultan during the last decades of eighteenth century CE. When he was defeated by the East India Company through Third Anglo-Mysore War, the Treaty of Seringapatam was agreed and the regions included in Tipu's kingdom was annexed with the East India Company. After the Anglo-Mysore wars, the parts of Malabar Coast, those became British colonies, were organized into a district of British India. They divided it into North Malabar and South Malabar on 30 March 1793 for administrative convenience. Though the general administrative headquarters of Malabar was at Calicut in South Malabar, the special headquarters of South Malabar was decided to be at Cherpulassery, which was then replaced to Ottapalam. South Malabar was the centre of the Malabar Rebellion in 1921. On 1 November 1956, this region was annexed with the Indian state of Kerala.

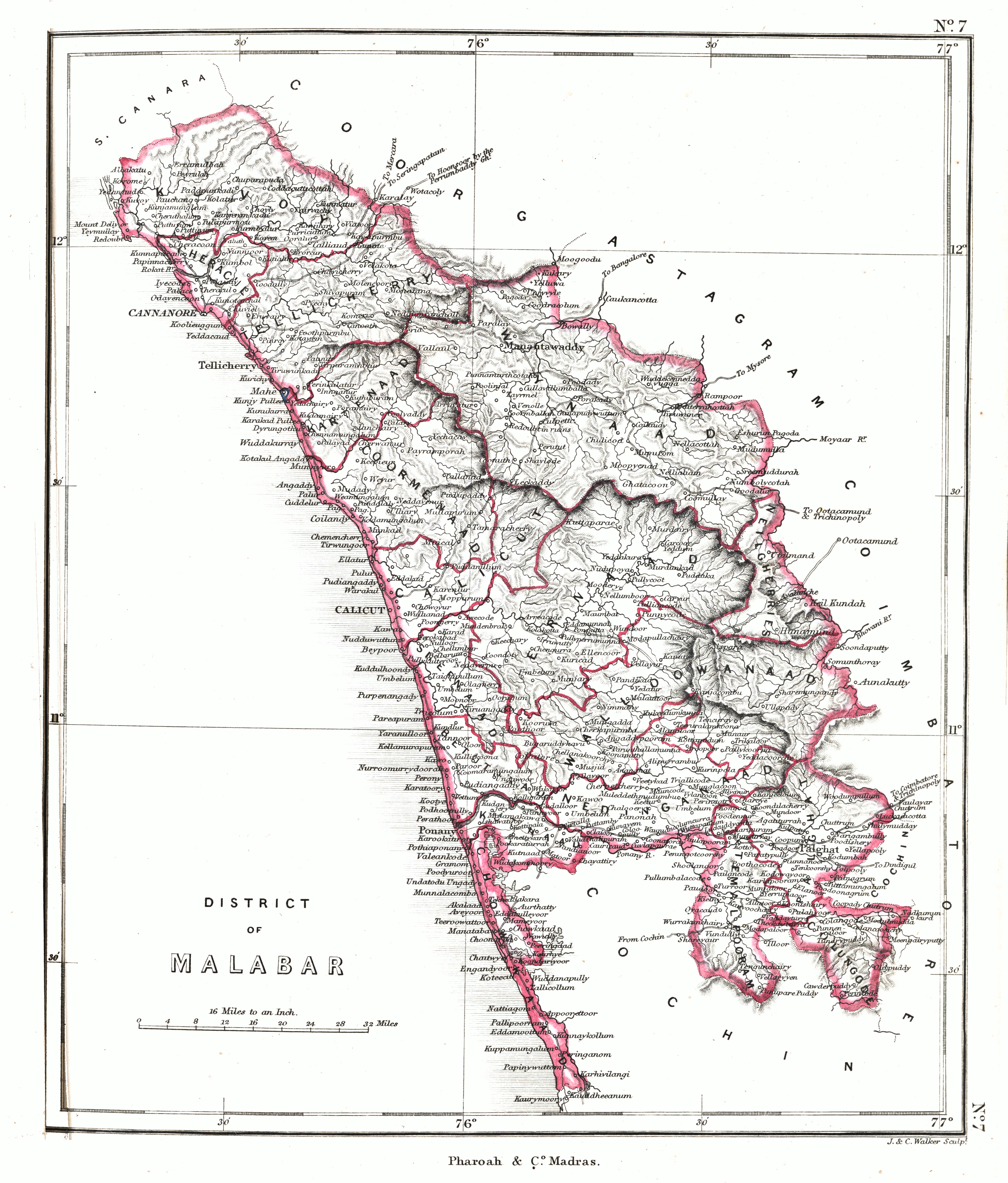
An old map of Malabar District (1854). Note that the taluks Pandalur, Gudalur, and Kundah in present-day Nilgiris district were parts of Wayanad Taluk (North Malabar) in 1854. The taluks of Malabar were rearranged in 1860 and 1877.

The East India Company captured the fort Kannur in 1790 and used it as one of their major military stations on the Malabar Coast. Initially the Malabar was placed under Bombay Presidency. Later in 1799-1800 year, Malabar along with South Canara was transferred to Madras Presidency. During the period of British colonial rule, Kannur was part of the Madras province in the Malabar District. The municipalities of Kannur and Thalassery were formed on 1 November 1866 according to the Madras Act 10 of 1865 (Amendment of the Improvements in Towns act 1850) of the British Indian Empire, along with the municipalities of Kozhikode, Palakkad, and Fort Kochi, making them the first modern municipalities in the modern state of Kerala.

Initially the British had to suffer local resistance against their rule under the leadership of Kerala Varma Pazhassi Raja, who had popular support in Thalassery-Wayanad region. The guerrilla war launched by Pazhassi Raja, the ruler of Kottayam province, against the East India Company had a huge impact on the history of Kannur. Changes in the socio-economic and political sectors in Kerala during the initial decades of the 20th century created conditions congenial for the growth of the Communist Party. Extension of English education initiated by Christian missionaries in 1906 and later carried forward by government, rebellion for wearing a cloth to cover upper parts of body, installing an idol at Aruvippuram in 1888, Malayali Memorial in 1891, establishment of SNDP Yogam in 1903, activities, struggles etc. became factors helpful to accelerate changes in Kerala society during a short time. These movements eventually coalesced into the Indian independence movement.

== Culture and people ==
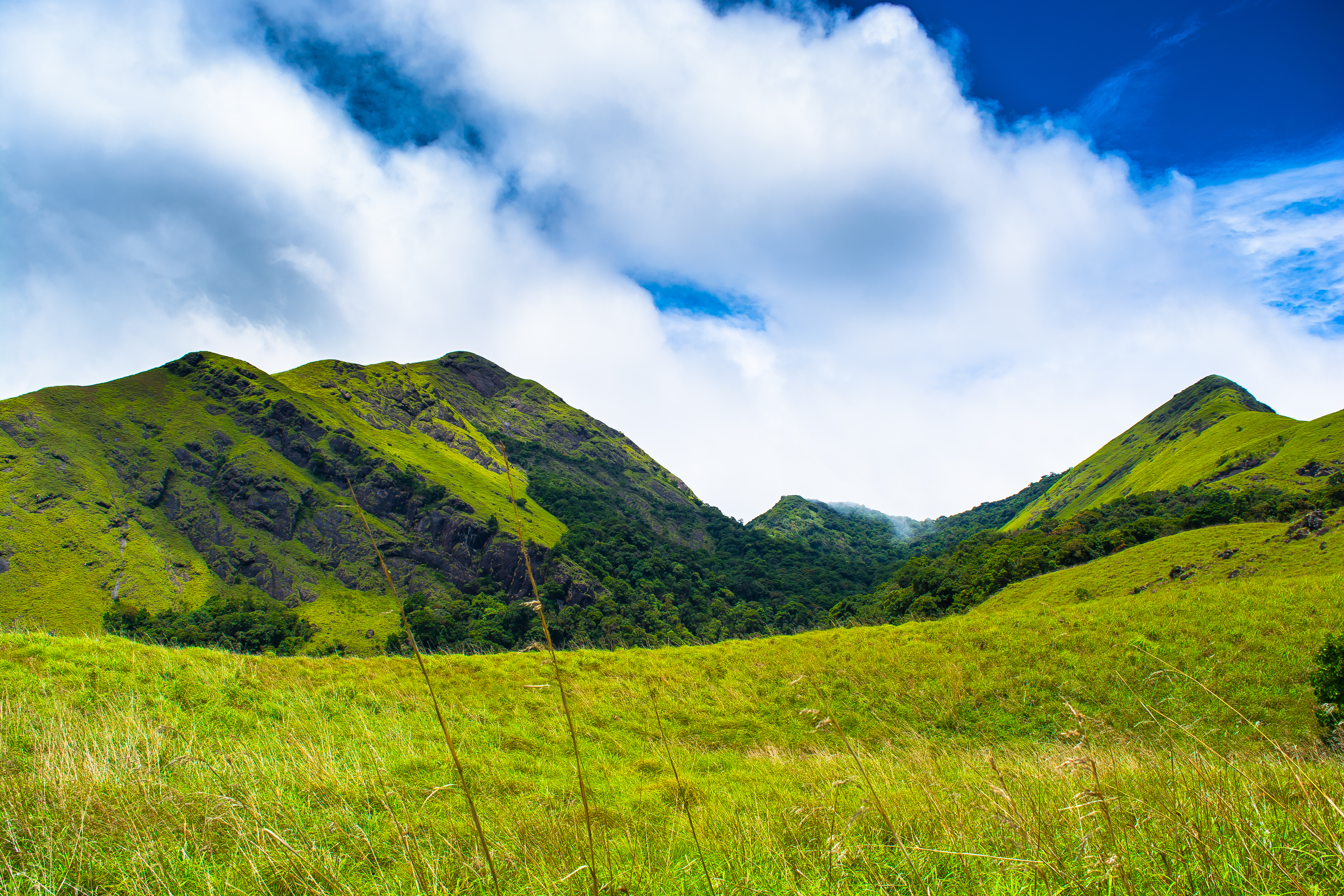
Wayanad in North Malabar is the only plateau region in Kerala.

The socio-cultural background and geography of this area has some distinctions compared to the rest of Kerala. The population consists of native Hindus, native Mappila-Muslims, native Jains and migrant-Christian communities and is characterized by distinct socio-cultural customs and behavior. The people of North Malabar have striven to preserve their distinct and unique identity and heritage since ancient times, through colonial times into modern political India. From the seventeenth century onward, until the early twentieth century, there were cultural taboos among certain communities from North Malabar, which forbade their women marrying people of the same respective communities, from the South Malabar. Even in modern times it is not uncommon to see "alliances from North Malabar region preferred" in newspaper matrimonial announcements placed by native North Malabar families, irrespective of their ethno-religious background. Traditionally North Malabar has remained the source of an erstwhile aristocracy for many of the southern territories of Kerala through displacement and adoptions including the Travancore royal family. Northern Malabar identity and pride is often possessively guarded by its natives of all ethnic and religious backgrounds.

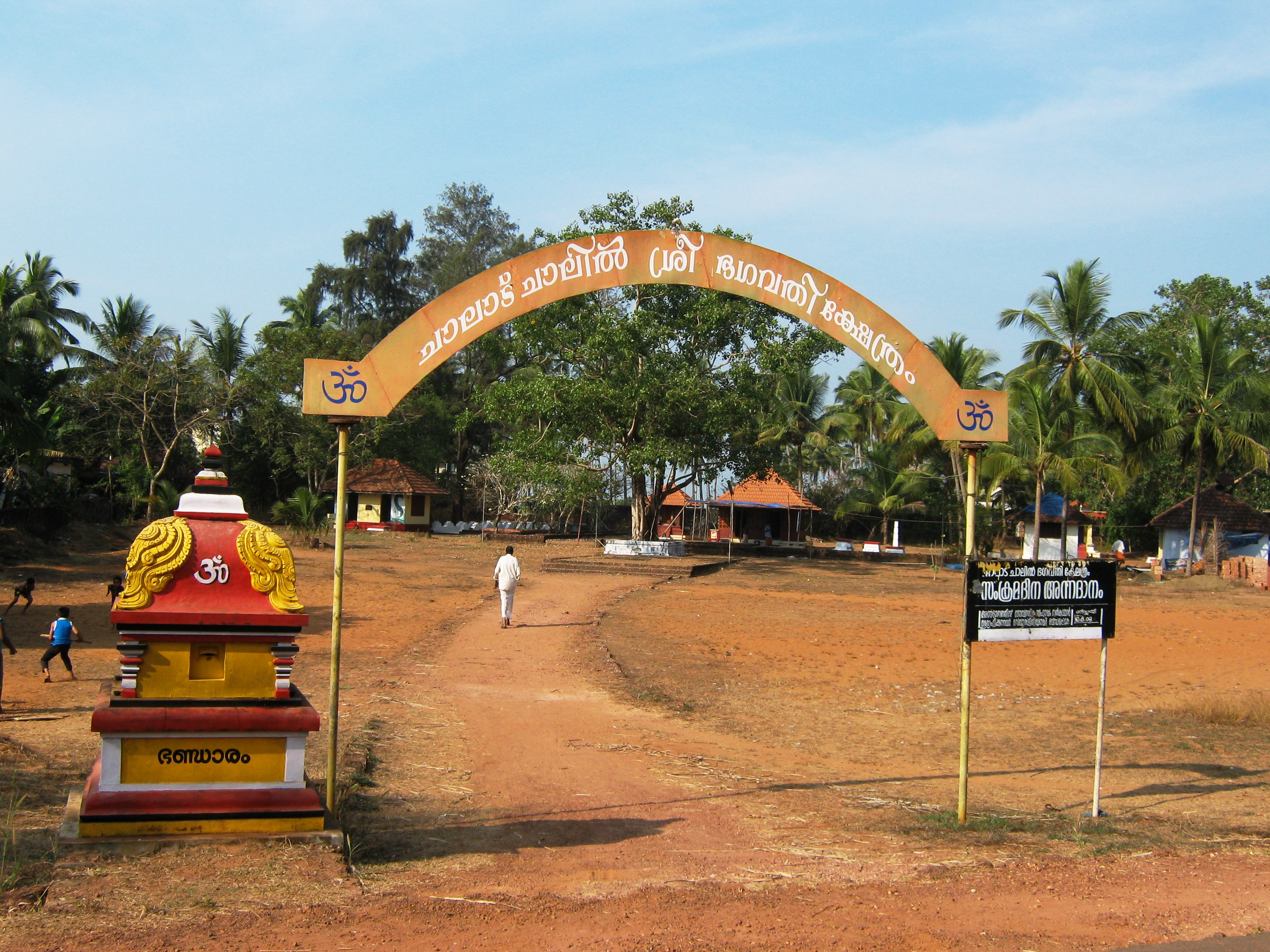
Chalad Chalil Bhagavathi Temple

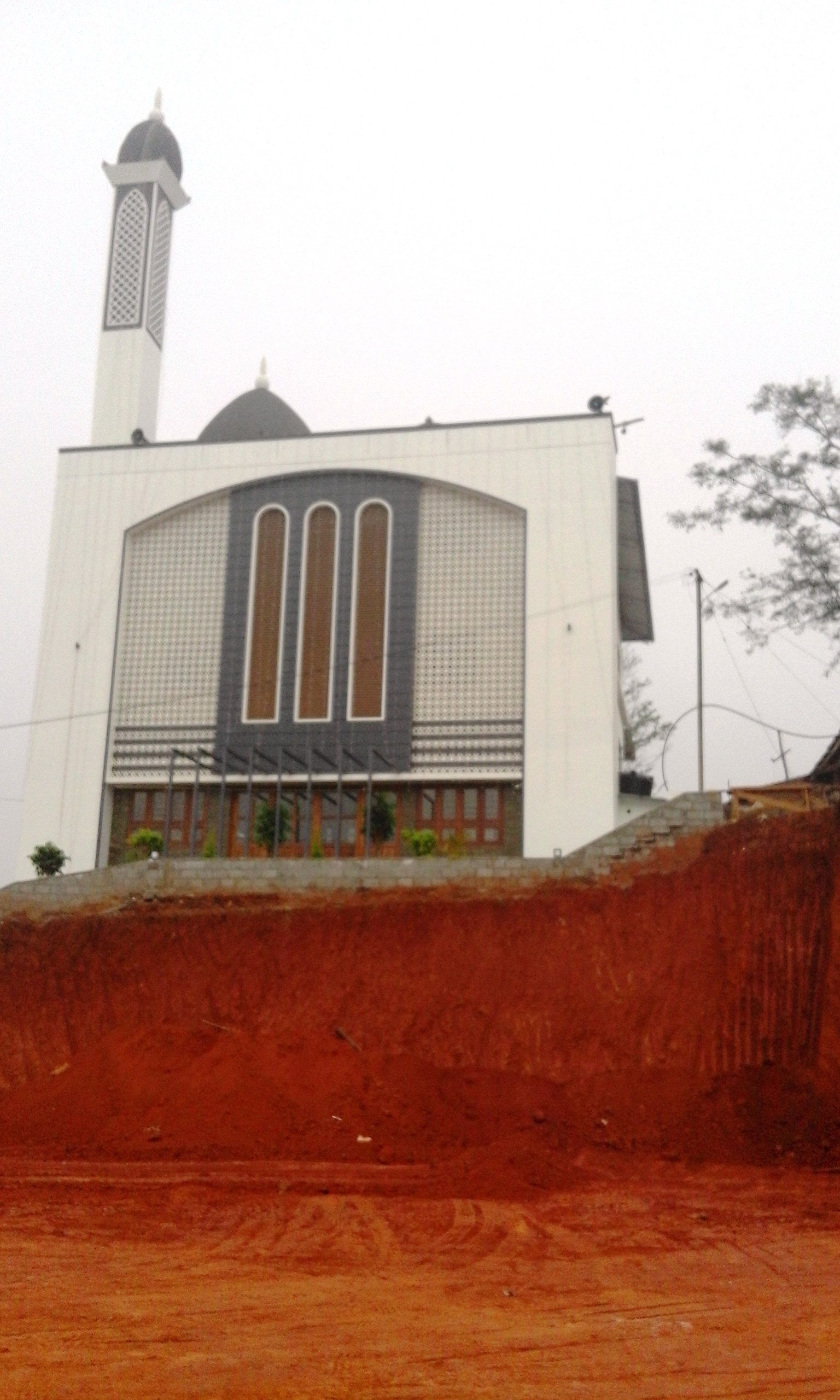
Sunni Mosque in Mananthavady

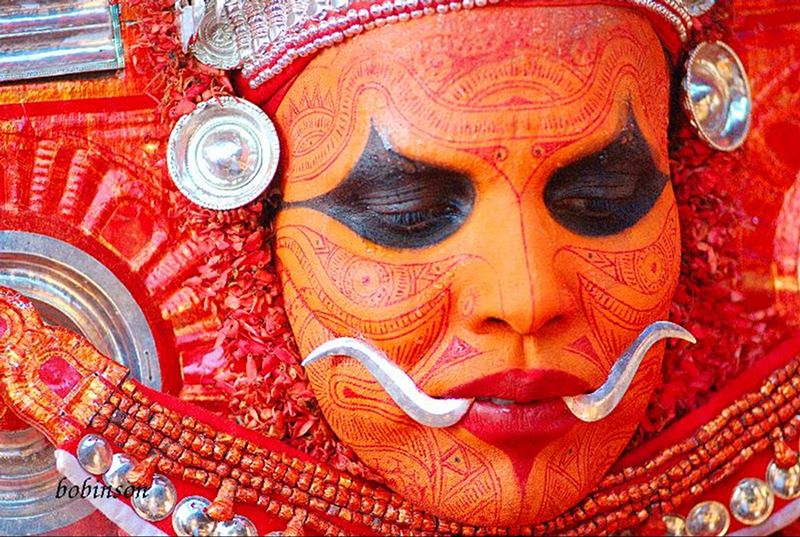
Theyyam - the ancient ritual art of North Malabar

=== Kottiyoor Utsavam ===
Kottiyoor Vysakha Mahotsavam is a 27-day yearly pilgrimage commemorating the mythology of Daksha Yaga, which attracts thousands of Hindu pilgrims from the Malabar region.

=== Social, cultural and historical features ===
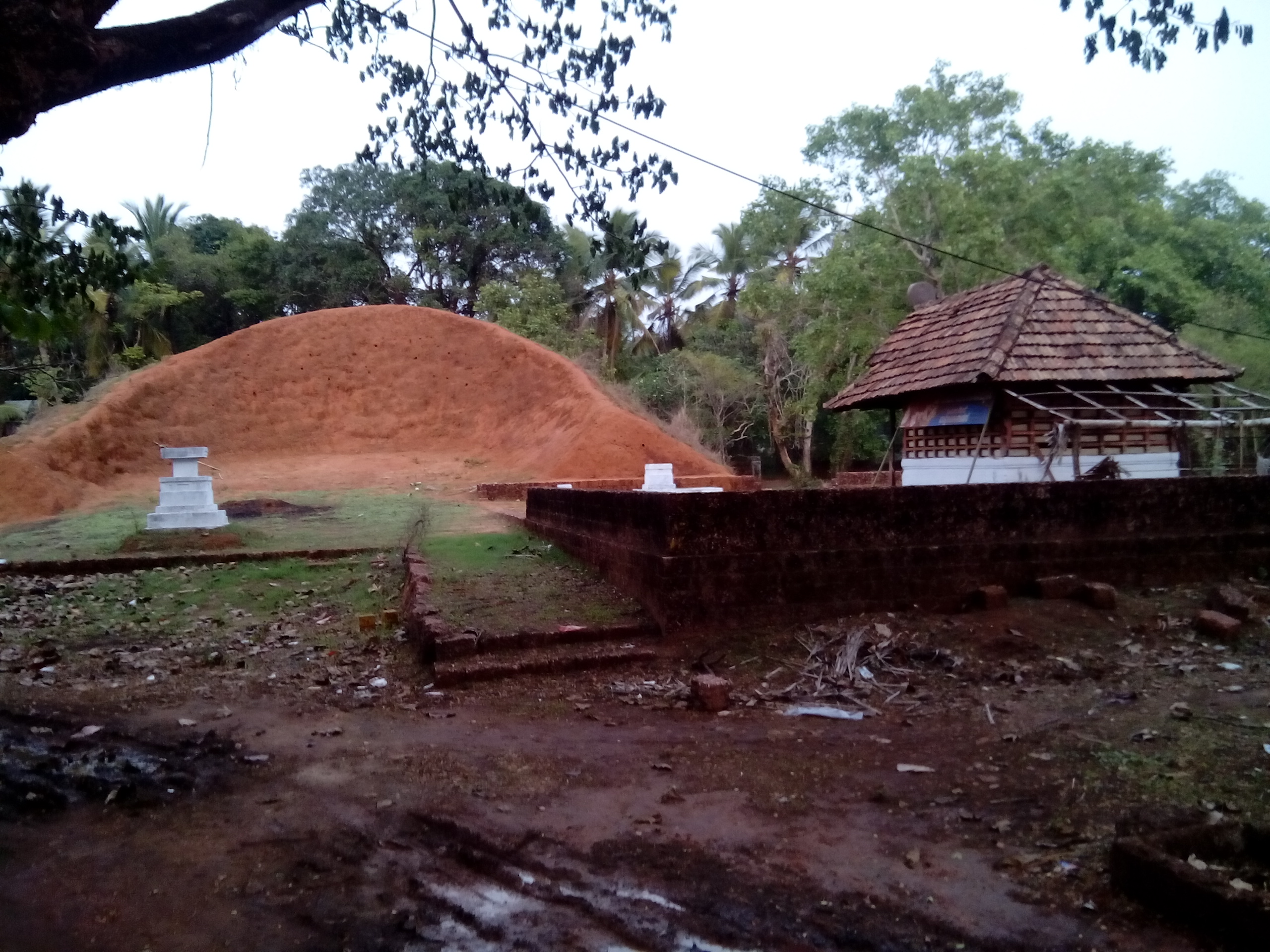
A Madappura (stand alone Kovil) where Theyyam rituals are performed seasonally. All the Muthappan Madappuras are built in similar style. These structures are found mainly in the North Malabar region of Kerala

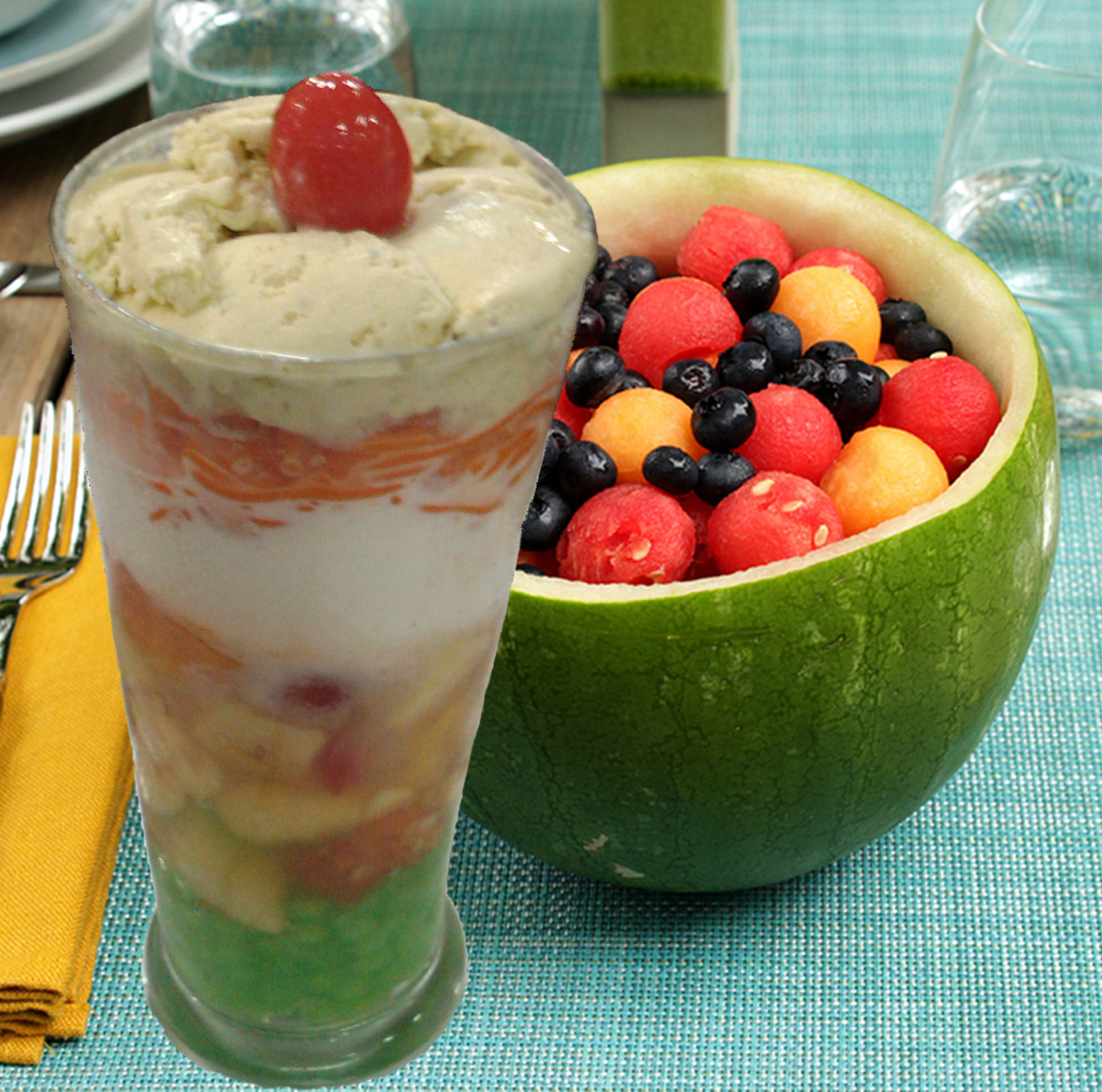
Thalassery in North Malabar is notable for Thalassery cuisine.

In the pre-democratic era, Marumakkathayam-matriliniality was widely prevalent among the natives of North Malabar and included both the Muslim and Nambudiri communities of Payyanur, in addition to other traditional matrilineal communities such as the Nair and Thiyyas. Marumakkathayam was also practiced by the Nair, Nambudiri, and Mappila communities in the Ponnani region of South Malabar.The practice of matrilineality was distinctly different and was predominantly virilocal with married couples residing with or near the husband's parents. Unlike other parts of erstwhile matrilineal-Kerala, polyandry was a strict taboo in North Malabar and exceptional customs such as Putravakaasham (purse/estate grants to children of male members) were occasionally allowed.

Landlords in Malabar during colonial and pre-colonial times were the largest landlords of Kerala and during this time political authority remained decentralized in contrast to that of the southern principalities. The royal position of Kolathiri, although immensely respected, was politically titular. In North Malabar, the Kolathiri Kings had the ritualistic status of Perumaal such that their official designates or sthanis retained their jurisdiction all over Kerala except for the Rajarajashwara Temple at Taliparamba.

The major festival observed by Hindus in this region is Vishu rather than Onam, which remains the major celebration for Hindus in the remainder of Kerala. In North Malabar, Vishu is celebrated as New Year. Because, the Kollavarsham month Medam - which is parallel to first Tamil month Chithirai - is the first month of the year for natives of North Malabar. The Vishu festival is spread over two days and comprises the Cheriya or small Vishu and the Valiya, or main Vishu. Unlike in the rest of Kerala it is not uncommon to see Hindu natives of this region cook and eat non-vegetarian food during their festivals including Vishu and Onam and sometimes even in marriage households.

People from all religions participate in major festivals at temples, mosques and churches. Some examples include: Nadapuram Mosque, Mahe Church, Moonnu Pettumma Palli Pappinisseri and Theyyam ritual art.

Unlike Travancore, but like the rest of Malabar and Cochin, natives of North Malabar mix coconut paste with sambar, the most common dish of South India.

North Malabar cuisine is noted for its variety of dishes including chutneys, pancakes, steamed cakes and various dishes such as kalathappam, kinnathappam, uruttu chammanthi, poduthol, pathiri, chatti pathiri and moodakadamban. Bakery-cuisine is well developed in the area and has led to large numbers of natives operating popular bakeries in Chennai, Bangalore, Mumbai, Coimbatore, Mysore, Pune and Southern Kerala.

People from this area are characterized by a stronger sense of socio-political aspirations often leading to large outbreaks of political violence.

Textiles, beedi, hand-weaving, plywood and coir represent important industries while cashew, cinnamon (North Malabar is home to Asia's largest cinnamon farm) and pepper are important cash crops.

North Malabar represents one of the earliest and largest pockets of exposure to other cultures in Kerala through Chalukyas, Hoysalas, Tuluvas, Rashtrakutas, Kodavas, Tulus, Arabs, Persians, Portuguese, Dutch, French, British, and through early employment and migrations in government and military services from the time of its incorporation into the Madras Presidency. Nevertheless, its people are conservatively possessive of its identity, preferring a "geographical endogamy" culture.

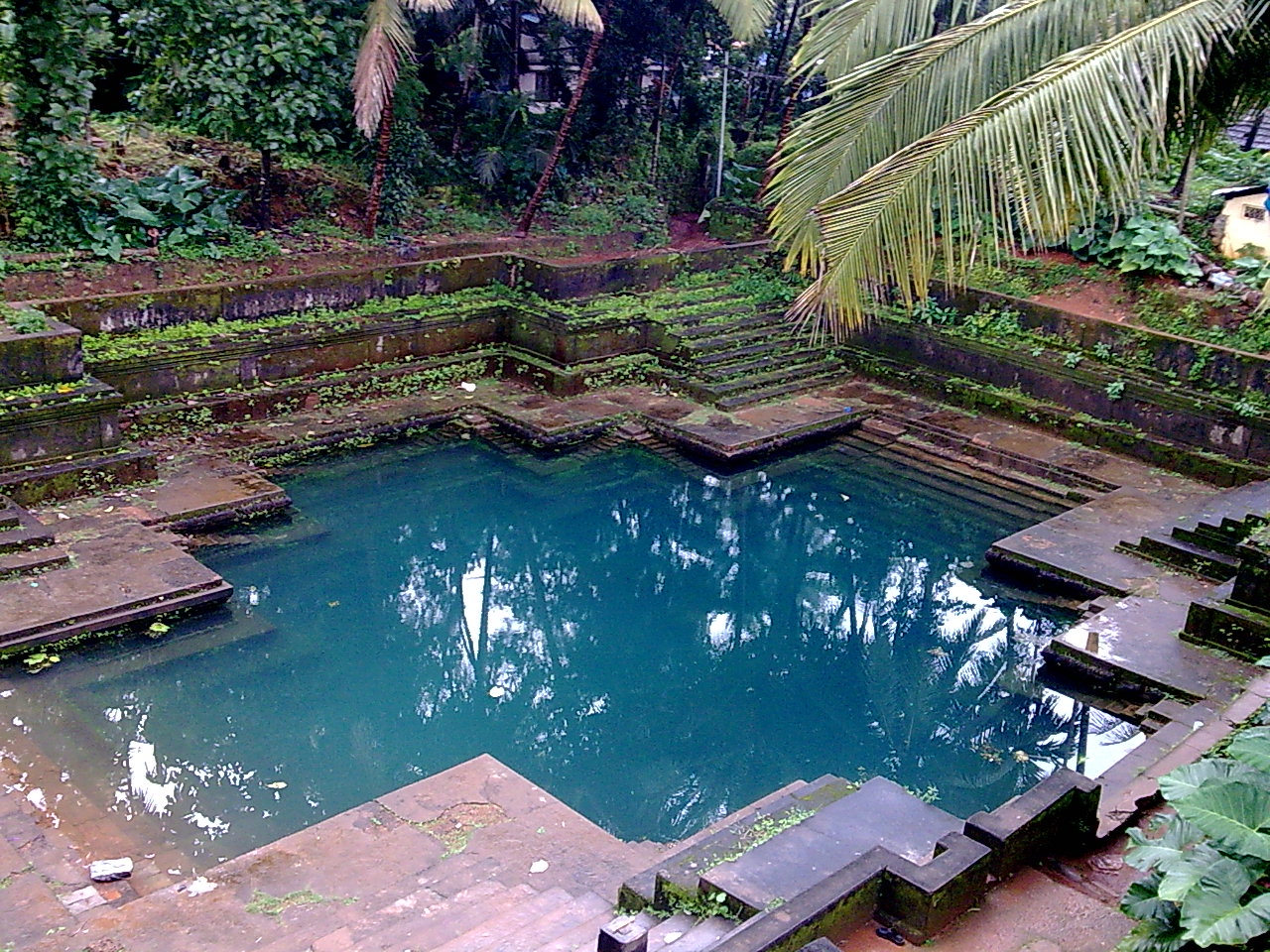
Nadapuram Masjid Pond - an indigenous designed pool

== Main cities/towns ==
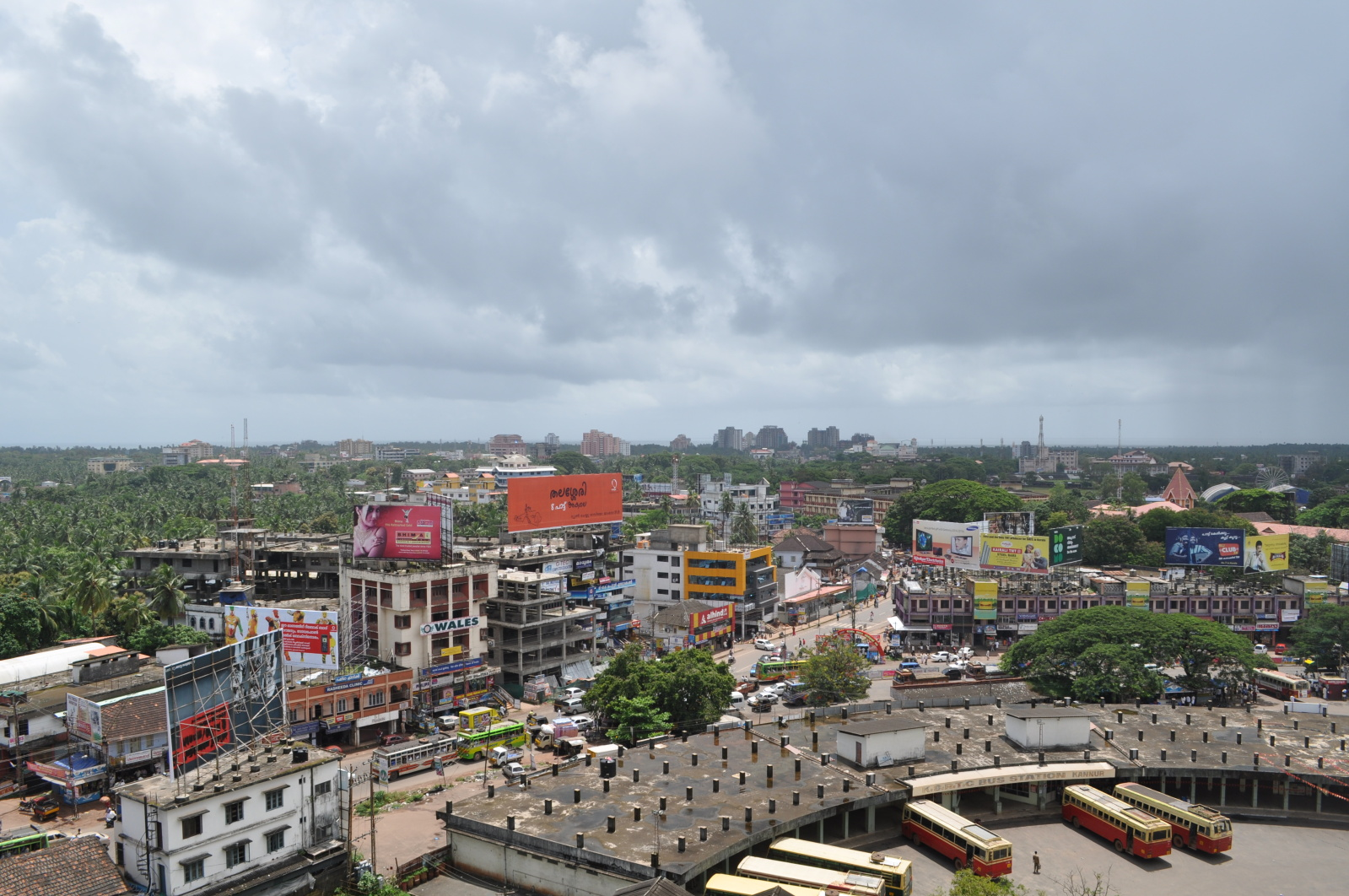
Kannur

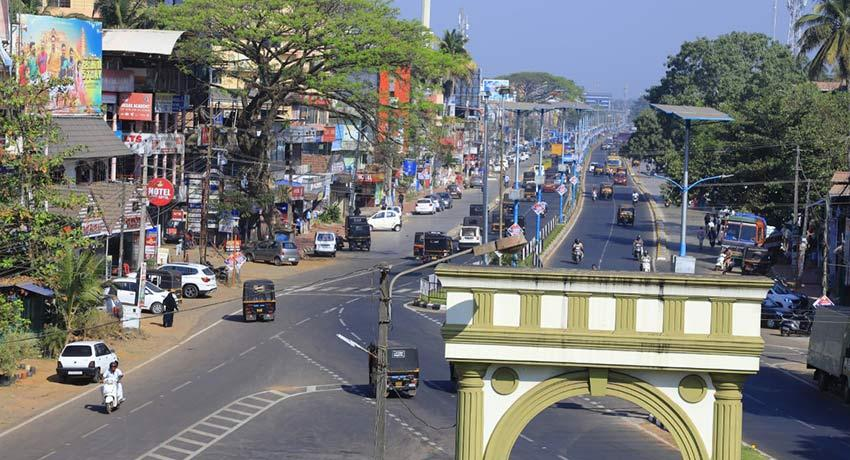
Kasaragod

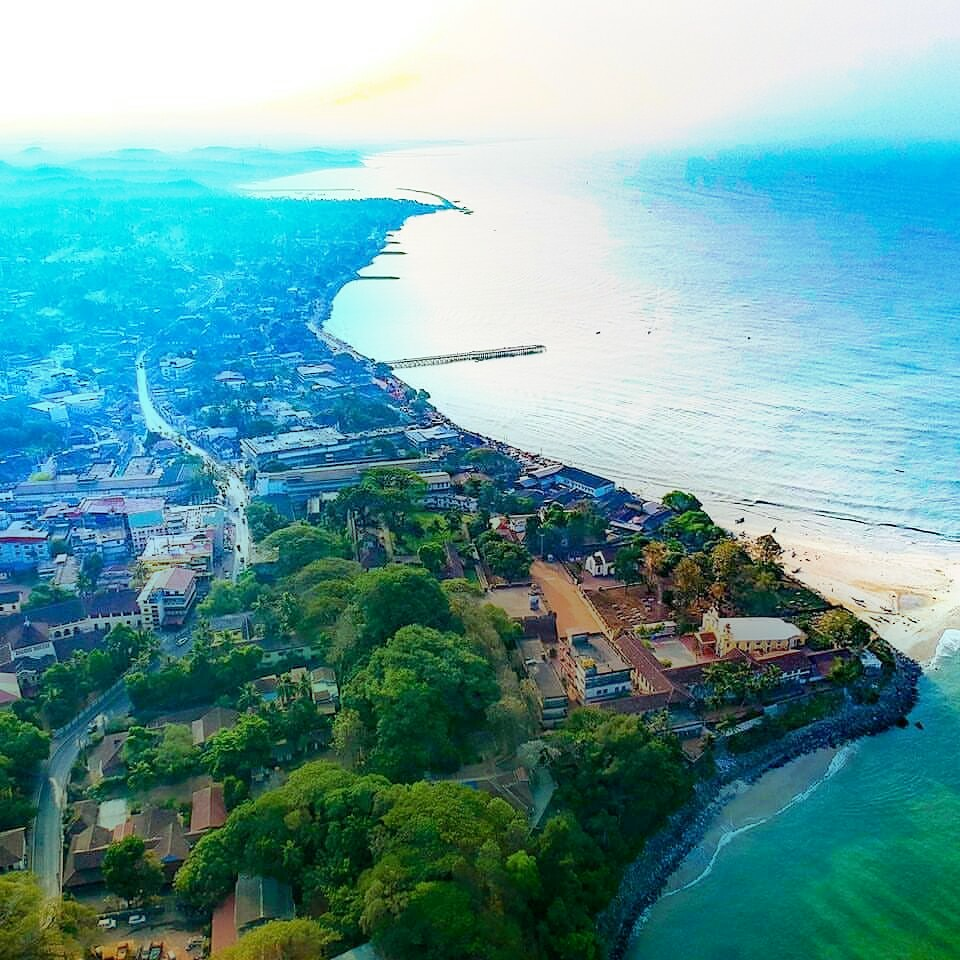
Thalassery

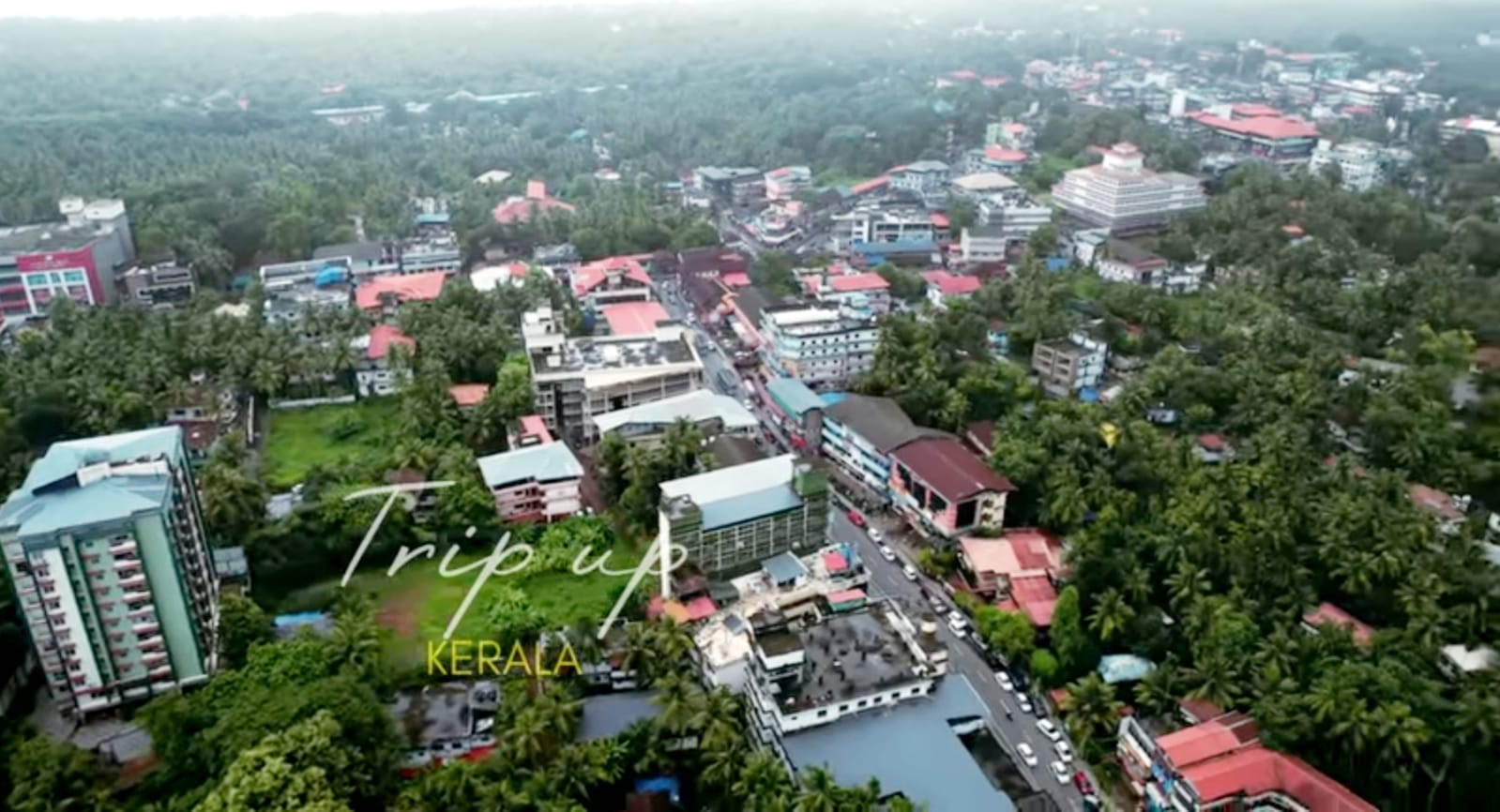
Vadakara

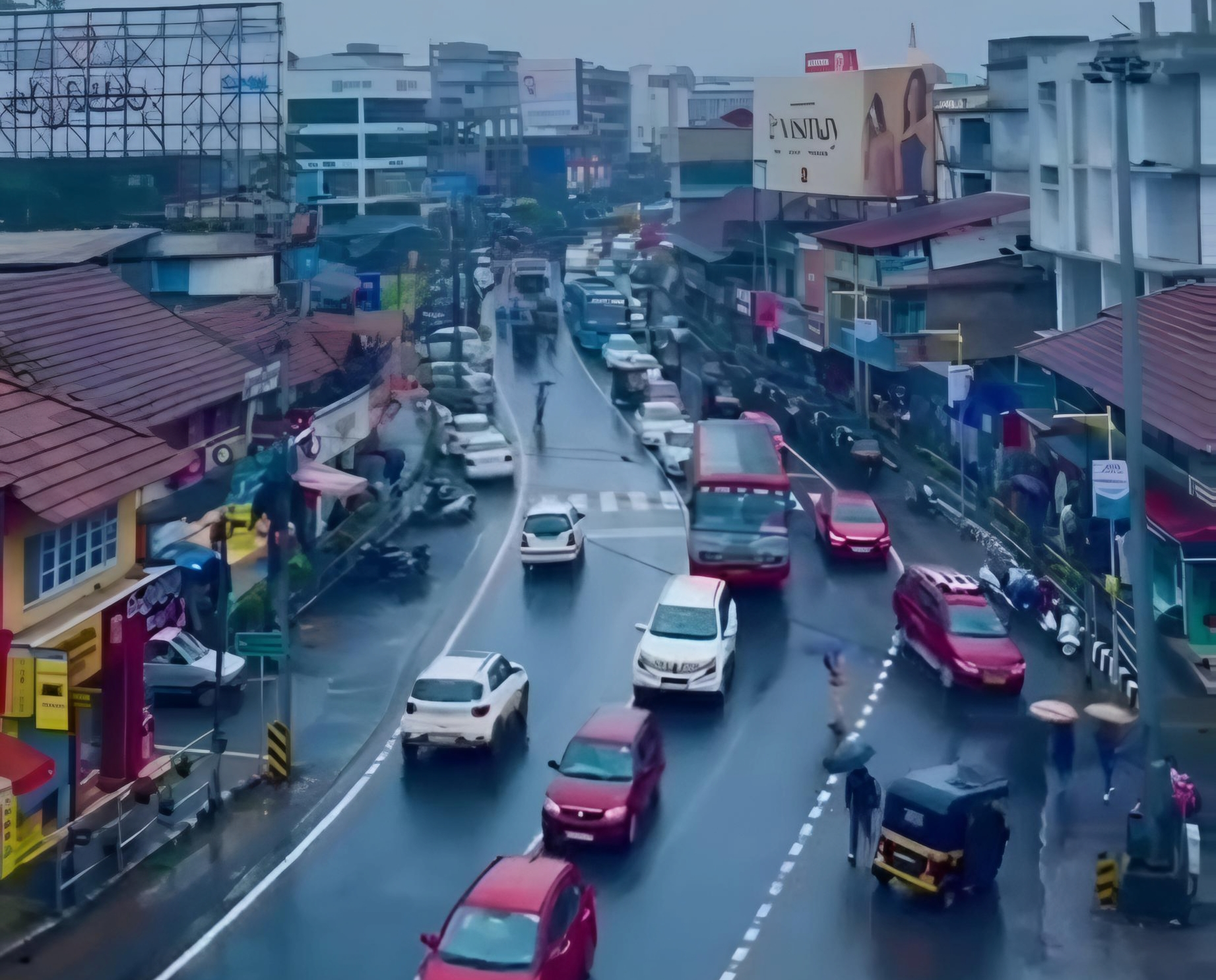
Kalpetta

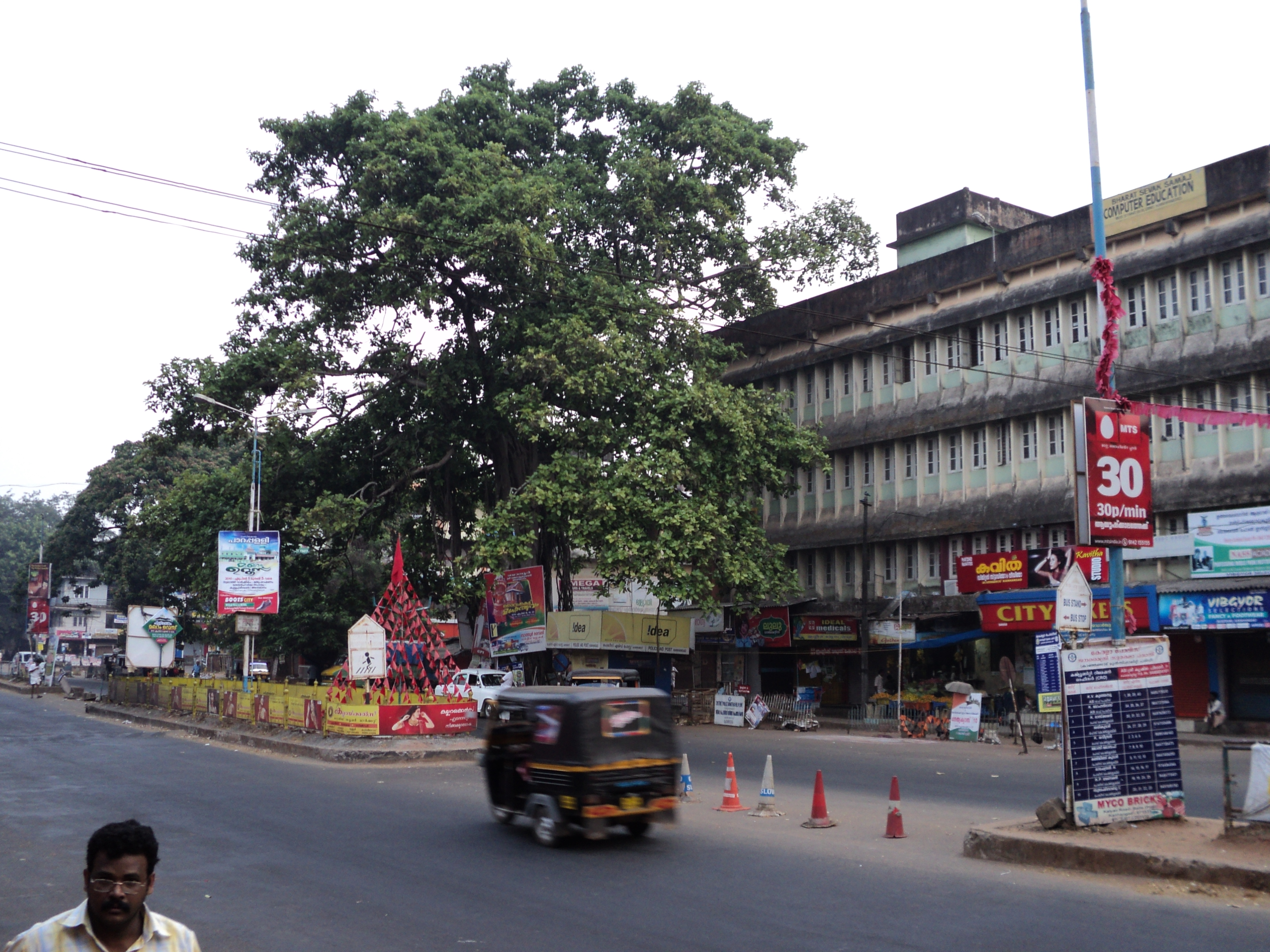
Kanhangad

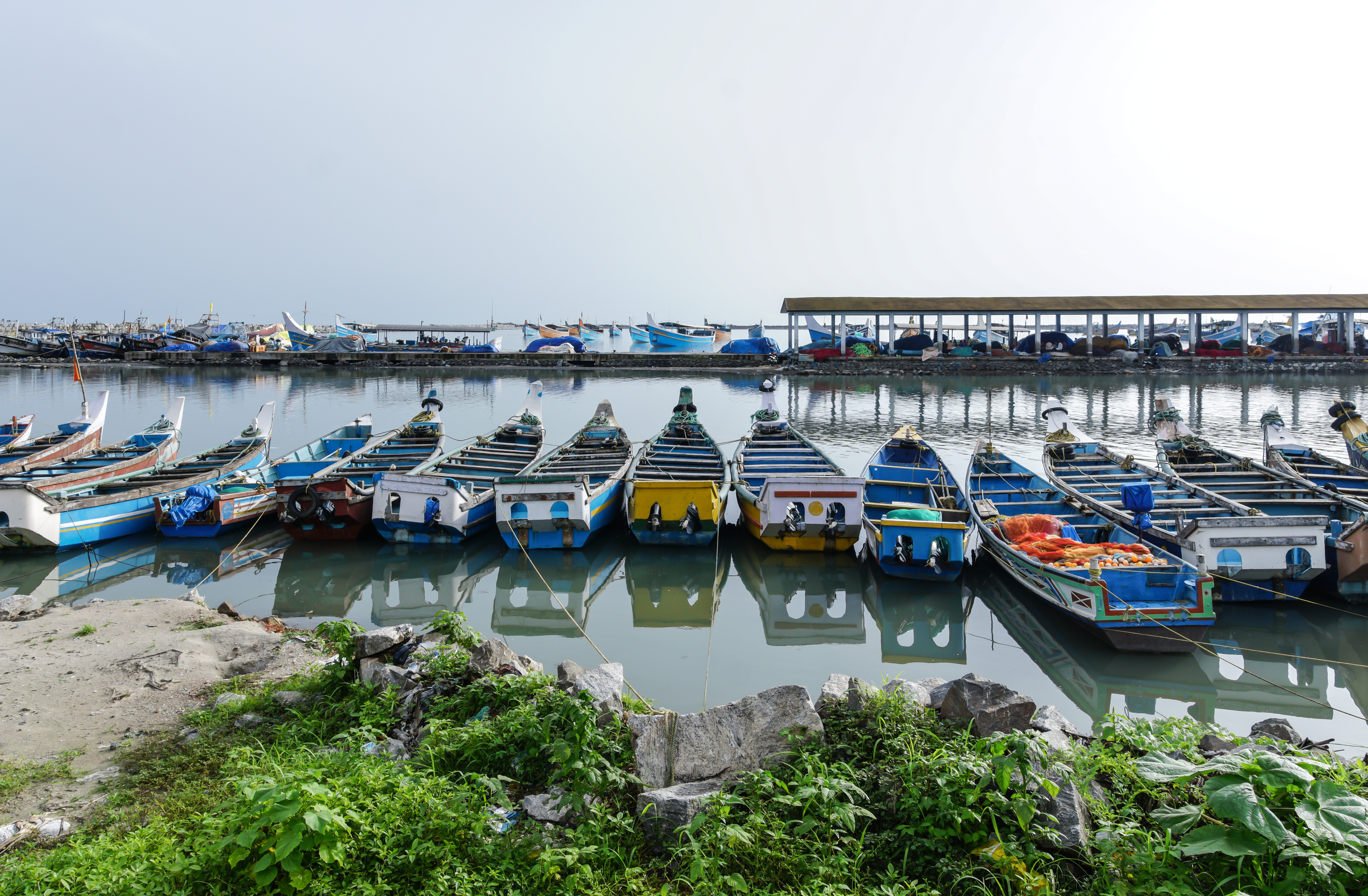
Koyilandy

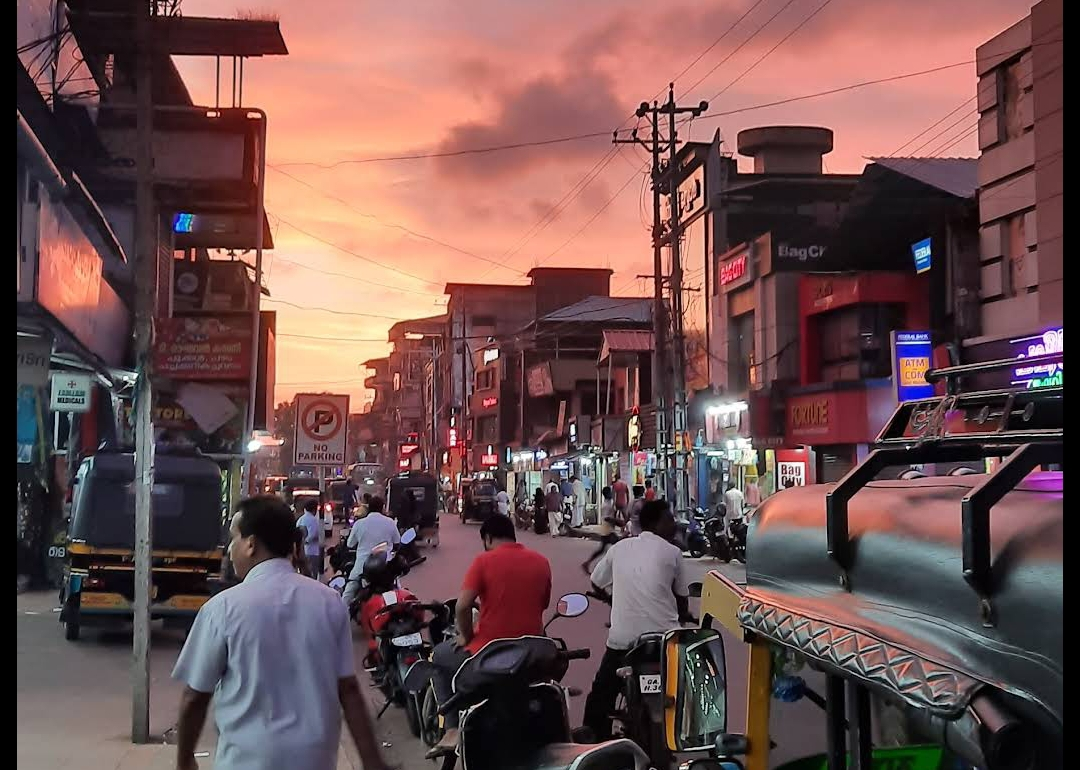
Payyanur

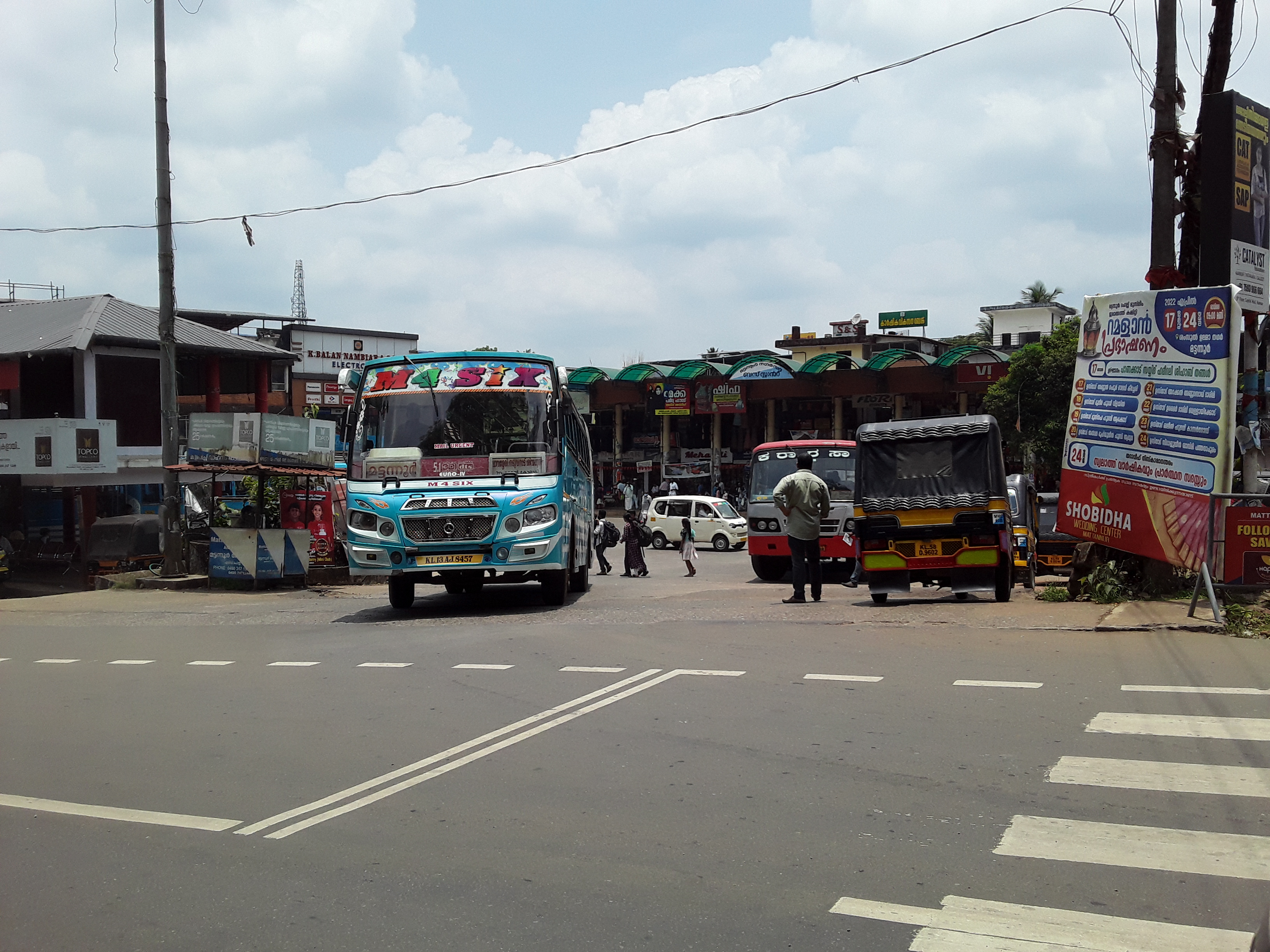
Mattanur

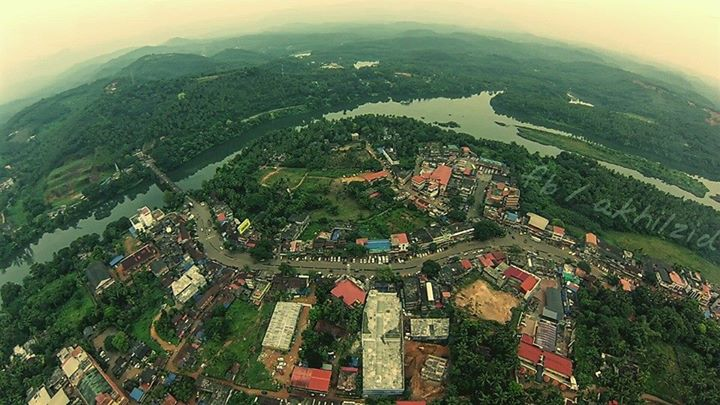
Iritty

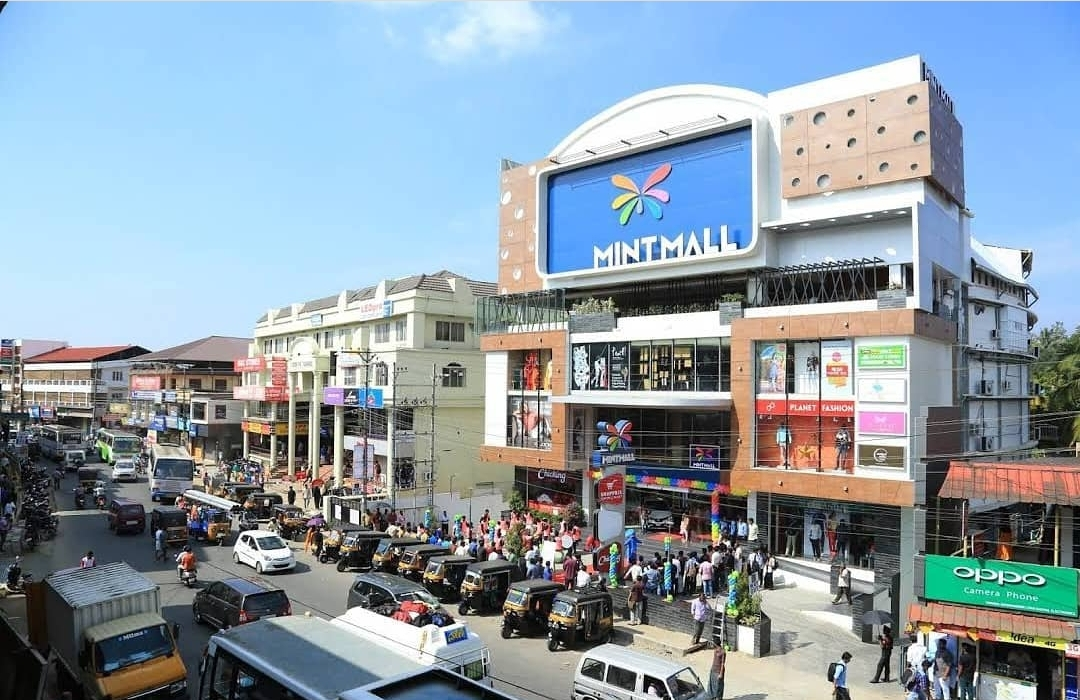
Sultan Bathery

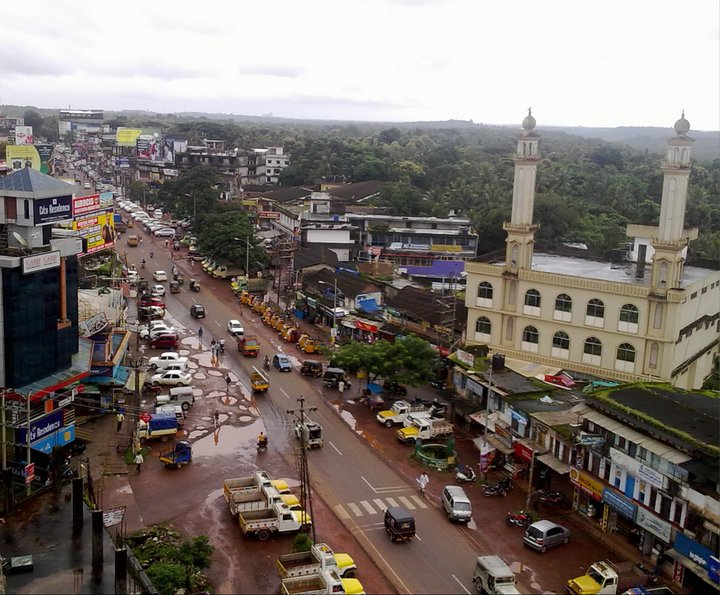
Taliparamba

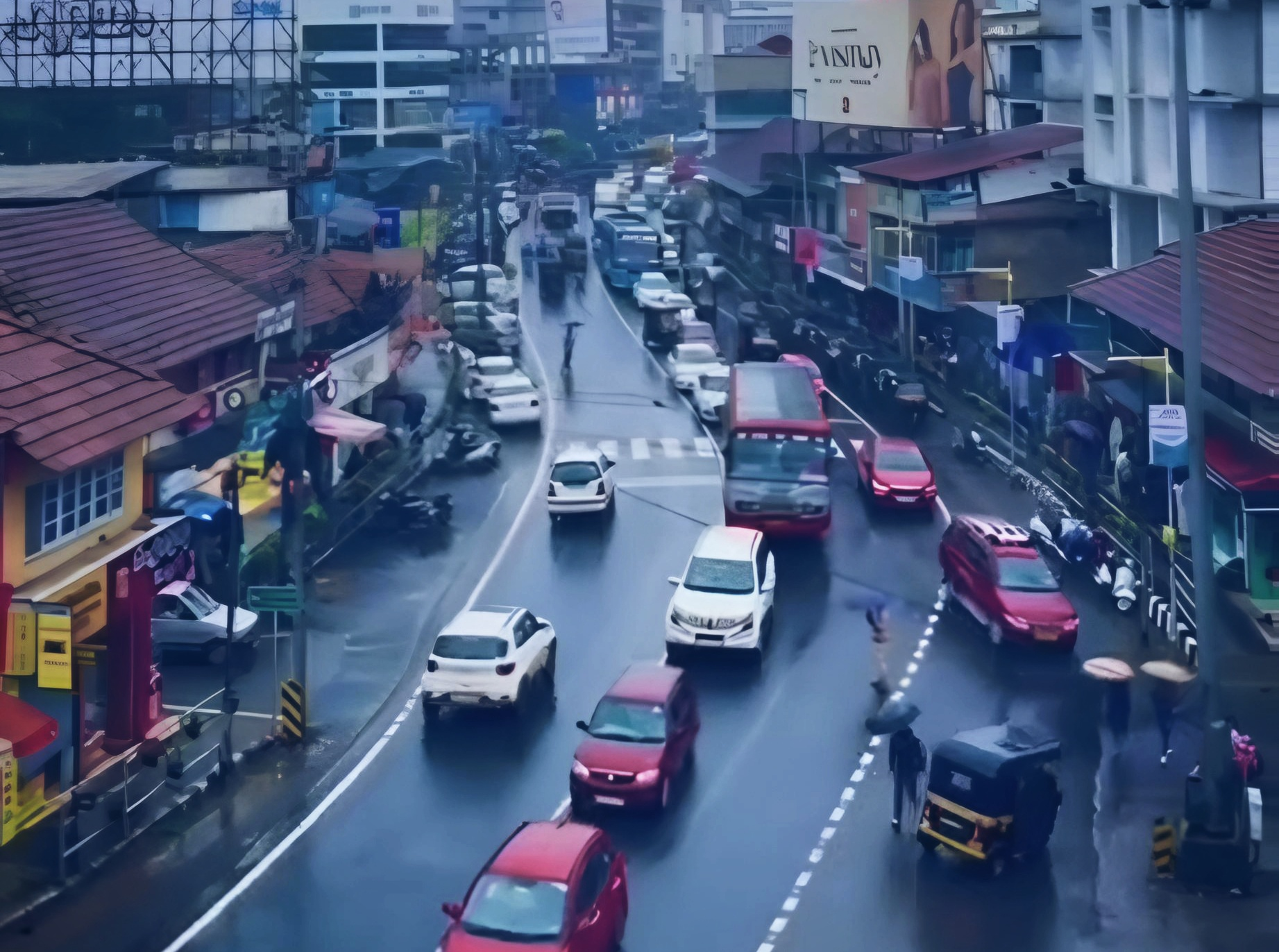
Mananthavady

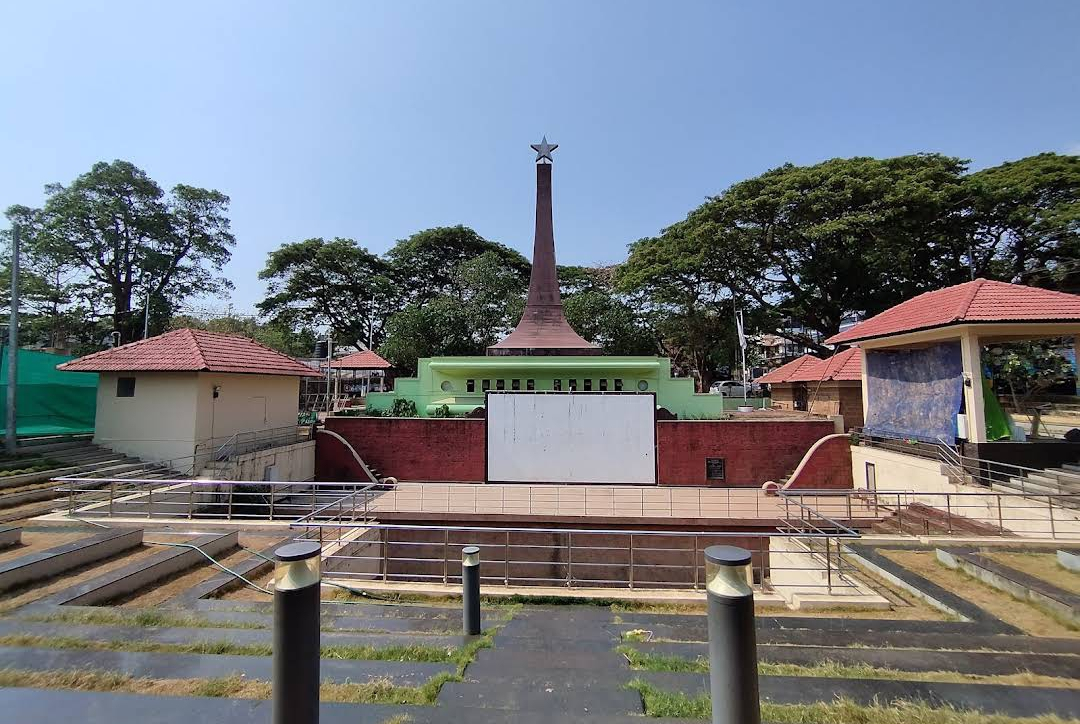
Kuthuparamba

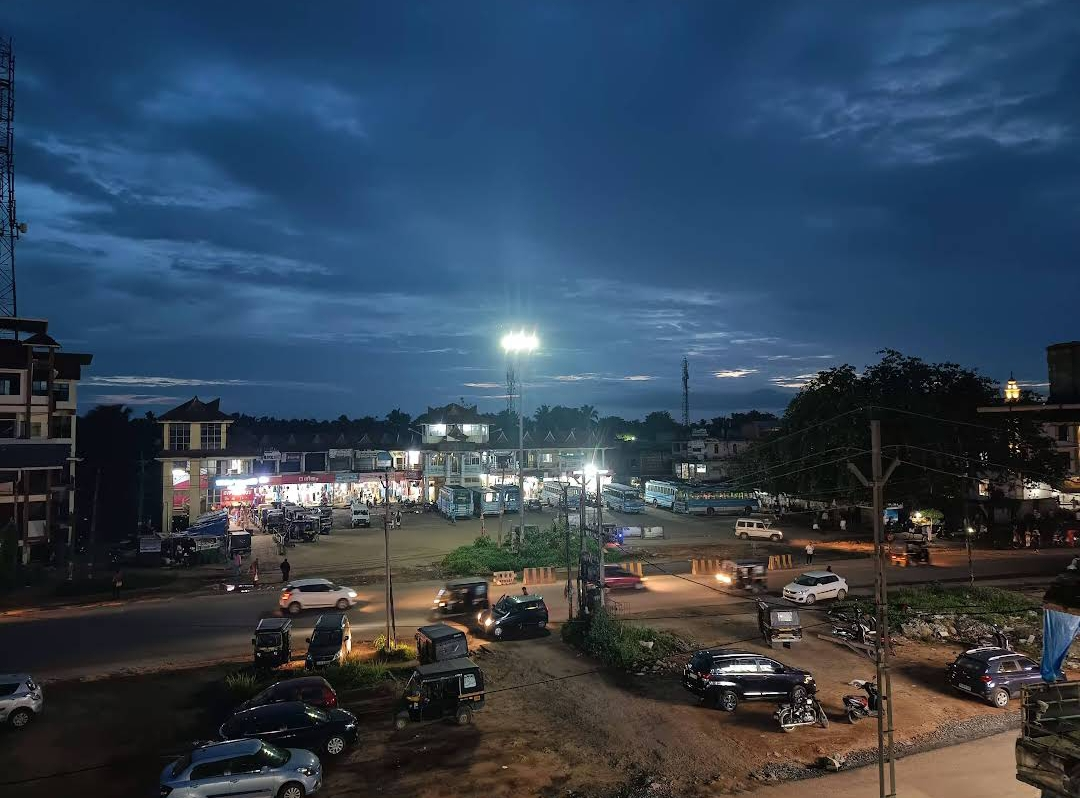
Payyoli

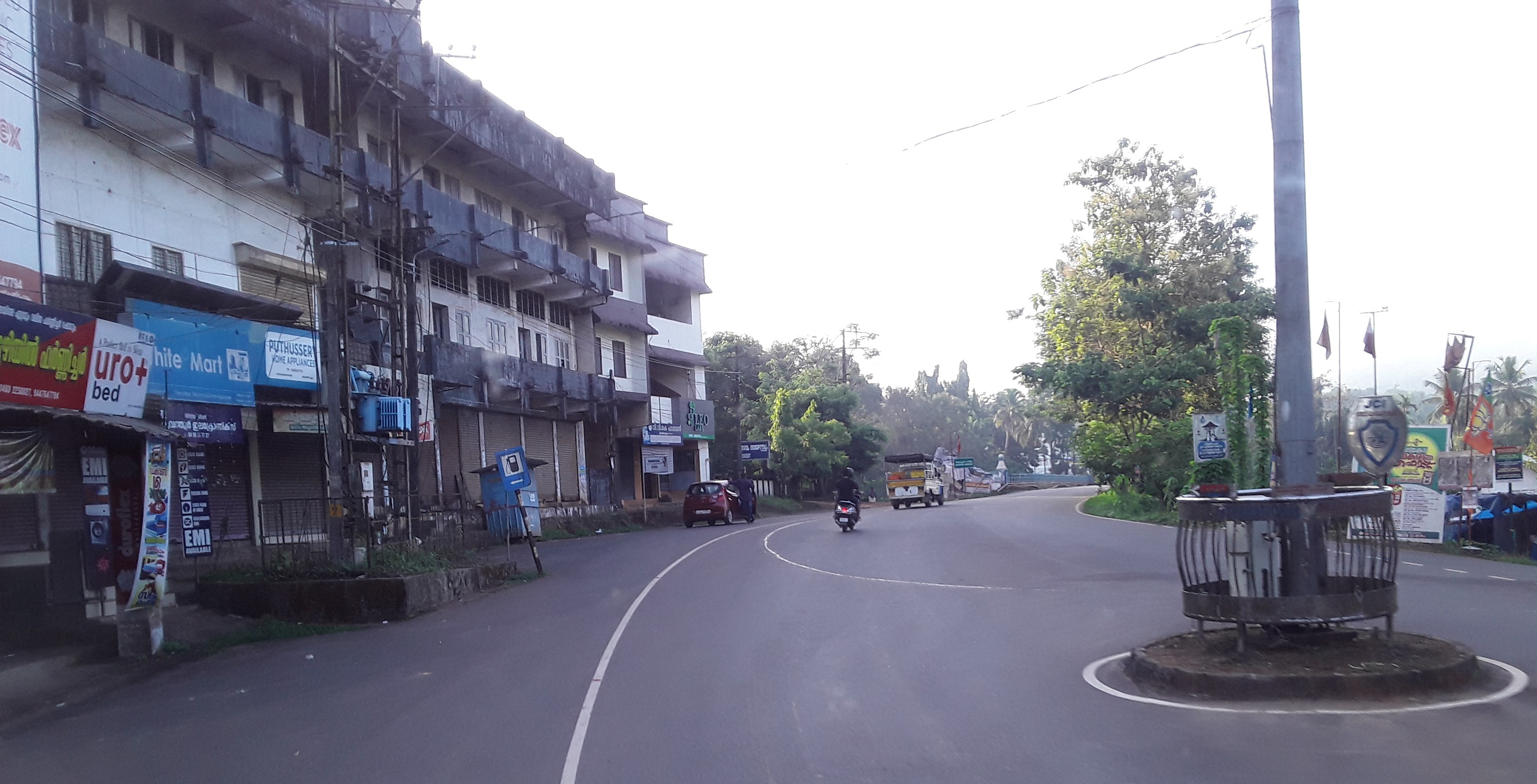
Sreekandapuram

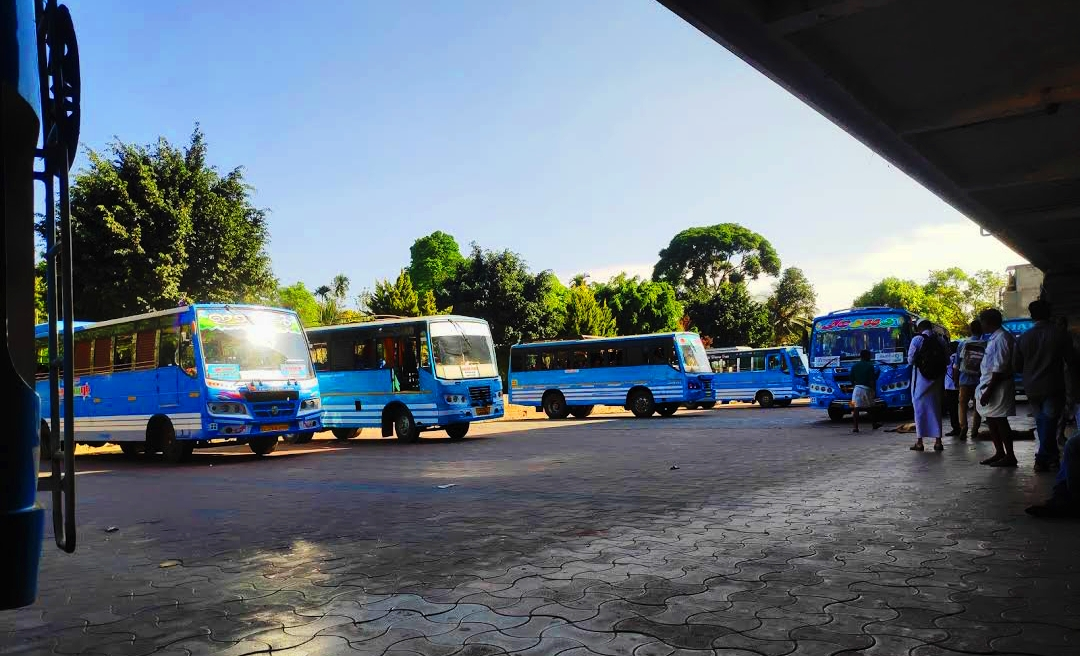
Meenangadi

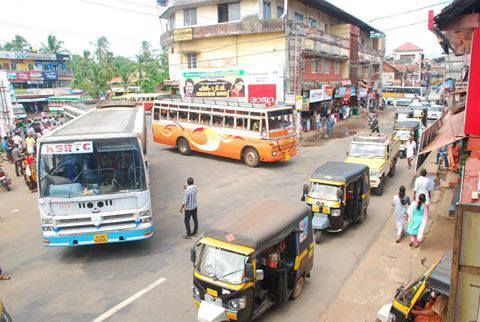
Nileshwaram

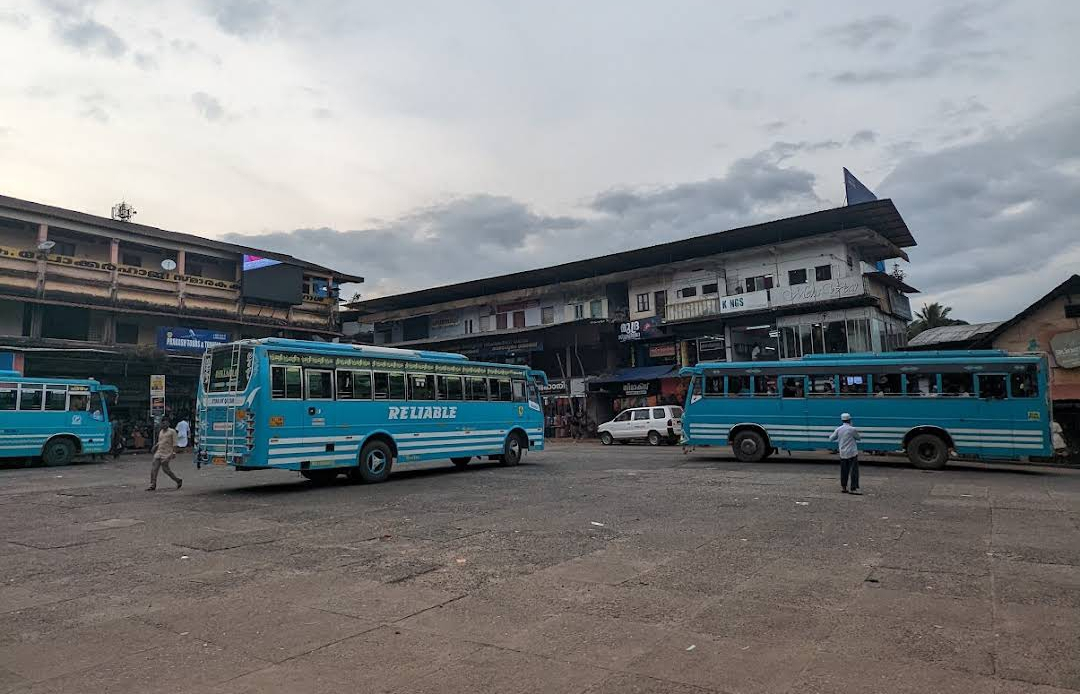
Nadapuram

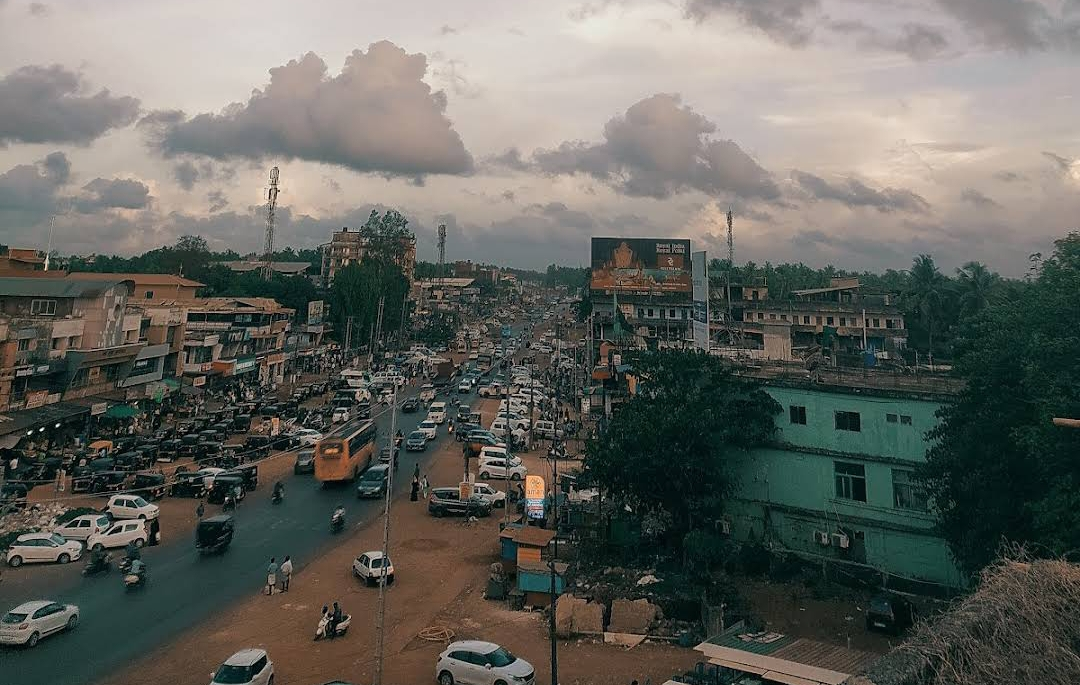
Uppala

Vellamunda

== Calendar system ==
The version of the Malayalam calendar or Kollavarsham used in central and south Kerala begins on August 25, 825 AD. The year commences with Simha-raasi (Leo) and not in Mesha-raasi (Aries) as in other Indian calendars. However, in North Malabar and Kolathunadu the start of the Kollam era is reckoned from the month of Kanya-rasi (Virgo), which begins on 25 September. This variation has two accounts associated with it.

Kerolopathi, a traditional text dealing with the origins of Malabar, attributes the introduction of the Kollam era to Shankaracharya. Translation of the phrase Aa chaa rya vaa ga bhed ya (meaning Shankaracharya's word/law is unalterable) into numbers in the Katapayadi notation produces 0 6 1 4 3 4 1 and these written backwards give the age of the Kali Yuga in the first year of the Kollam era. Kali, day 1,434,160, would work out to be September 25, 825 AD, which corresponds to the beginning of the Kollam era in North Malabar, i.e. the first day of the month of Kanya-raasi (Virgo) .

== Dialects ==
There are several dialects of the Malayalam language prevalent in North Malabar. Loan words, excluding the significant number of words from Sanskrit, originated mostly due to centuries long interactions between the native population of North Malabar and the horse and spice traders of the world. These included trading contacts with Arabia, Persia, Israel, China and European colonial powers for several centuries. Examples of these dialects include Kasaragod Malayalam and Mappila Malayalam. However, the majority of the young-adult Keralites from other provinces who are ignorant of the rich melting-pot culture of Malabar dialects are uncomfortable with these forms of Malayalam.

Some influences are enumerated
Loaned from	Usages
Hebrew	Shalom/salaam aayi meaning died (lit. entered the state of peace).
Arabic	Bejaar meaning anxiety; matlab meaning consequence; barkat/varkkat meaning value are few examples
Portuguese	Veeppa meaning "basket“; 'maesha' meaning "table“; 'jenela' meaning "window“
Cryptic Sanskrit tendencies	In North Malabar fish curry is referred to as malsya-curry (from the Sanskrit word matsya for fish) rather than southern usage of meen-curry. Similarly, feeling hungry is paikkunnu rather than southern usage of vishakkunnu. Other examples are annam instead of choru (cooked rice), dhani instead of kaashukaaran (rich man), the word amba (mother) for cow, gauli (lizard) etc.

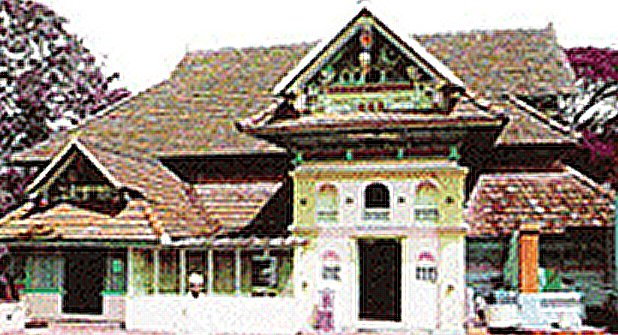
Malik Deenar Mosque

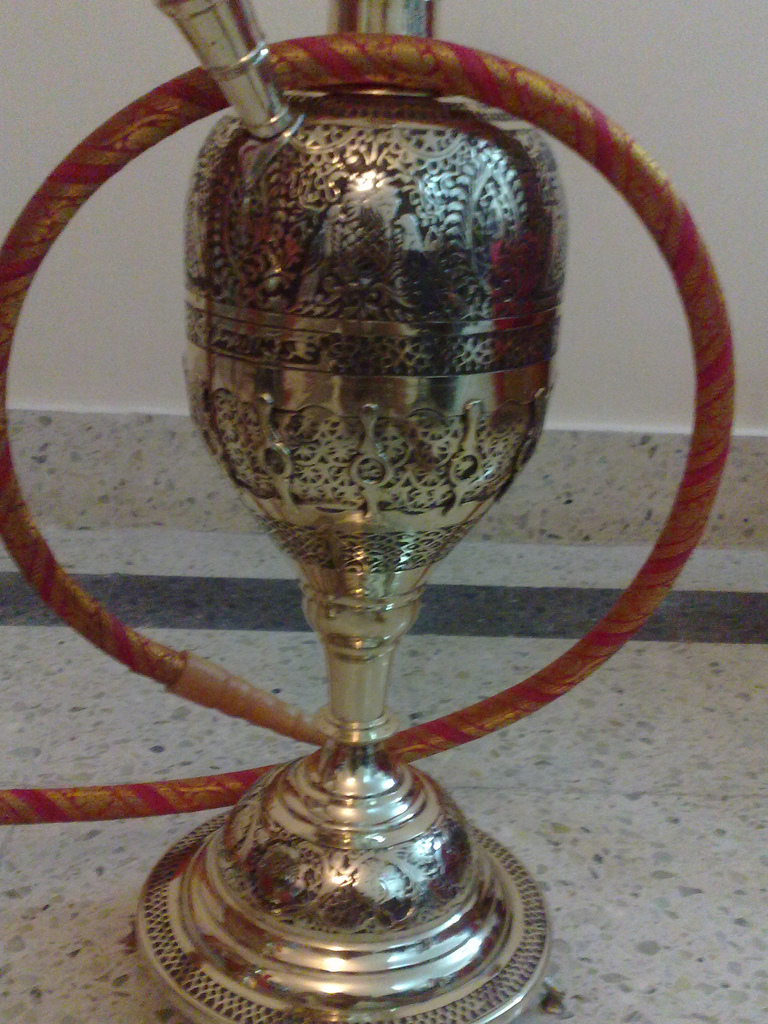
The intricate work on a North Malabar hookah

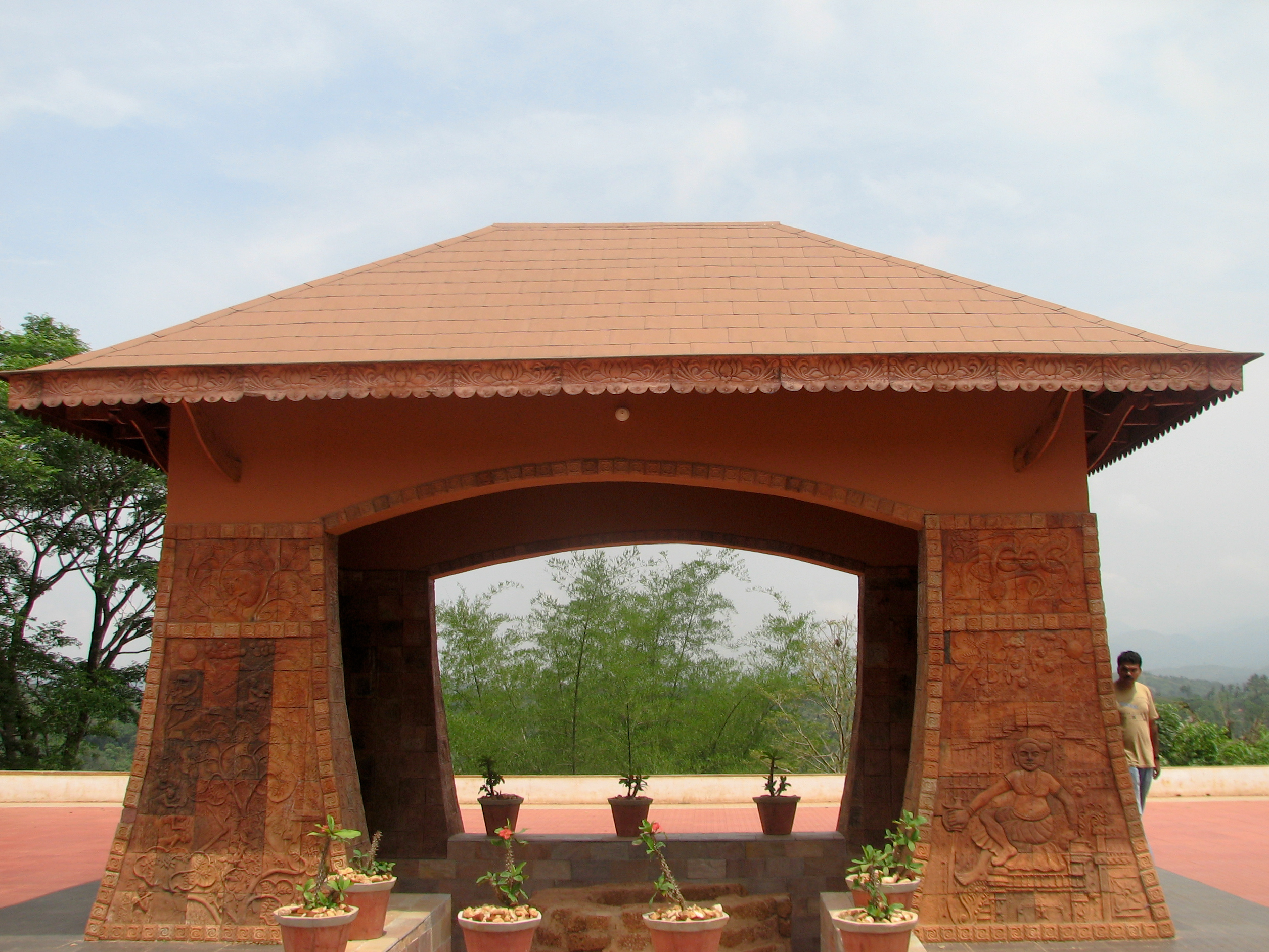
Pazhassi Kudeeram in Mananthavadi

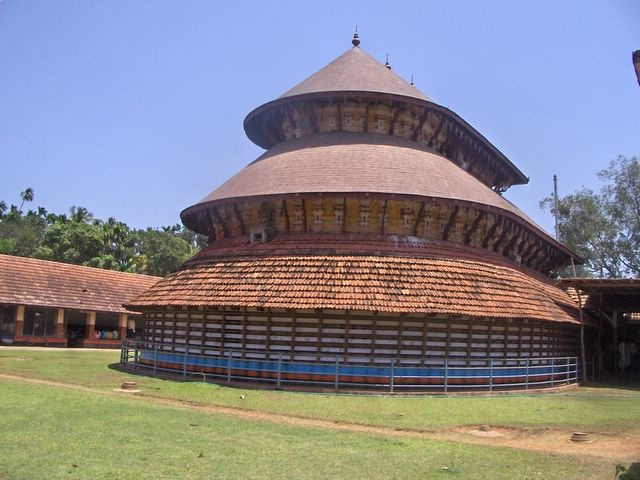
Madhur Temple

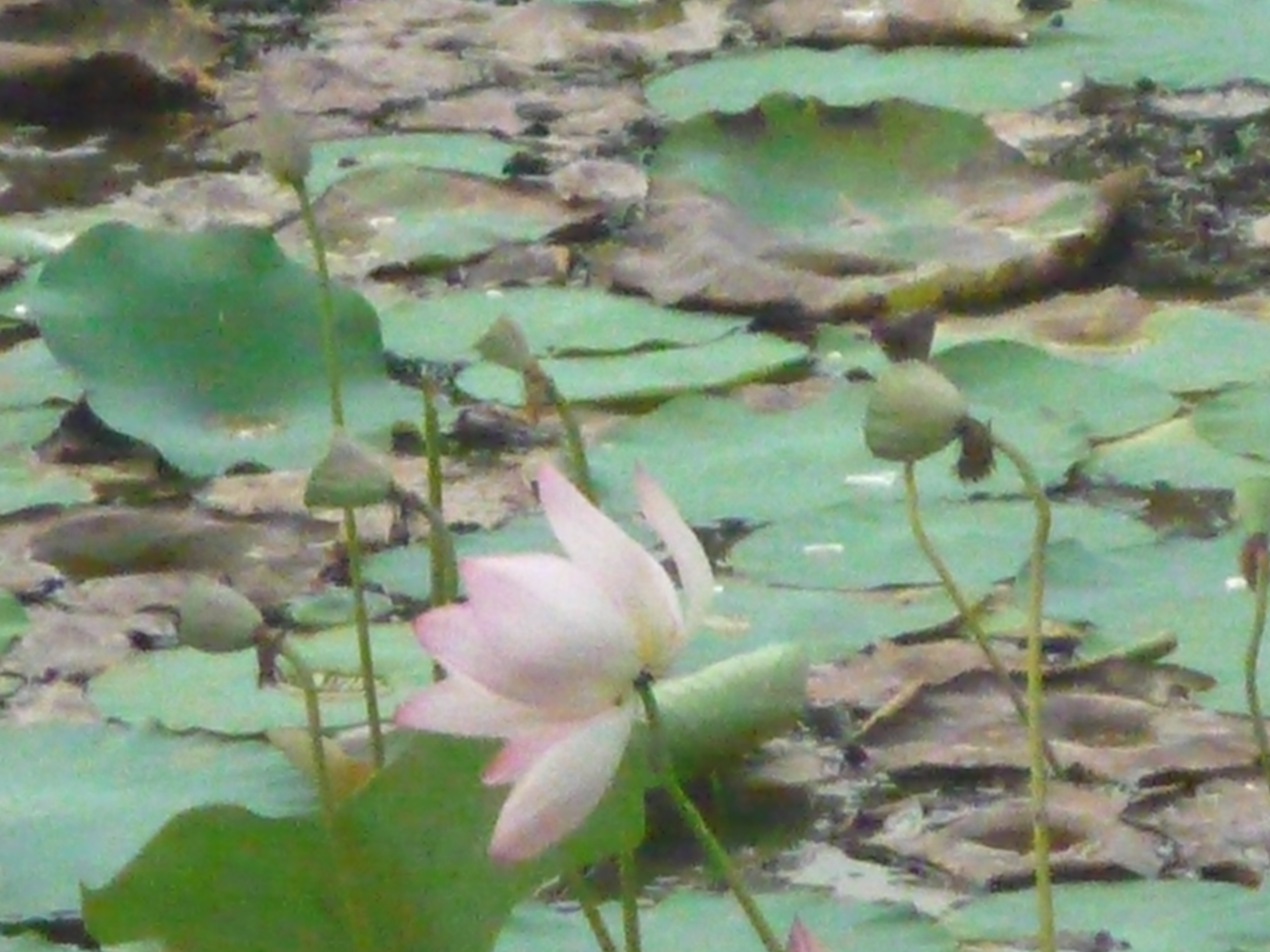
A lotus pond in Purameri

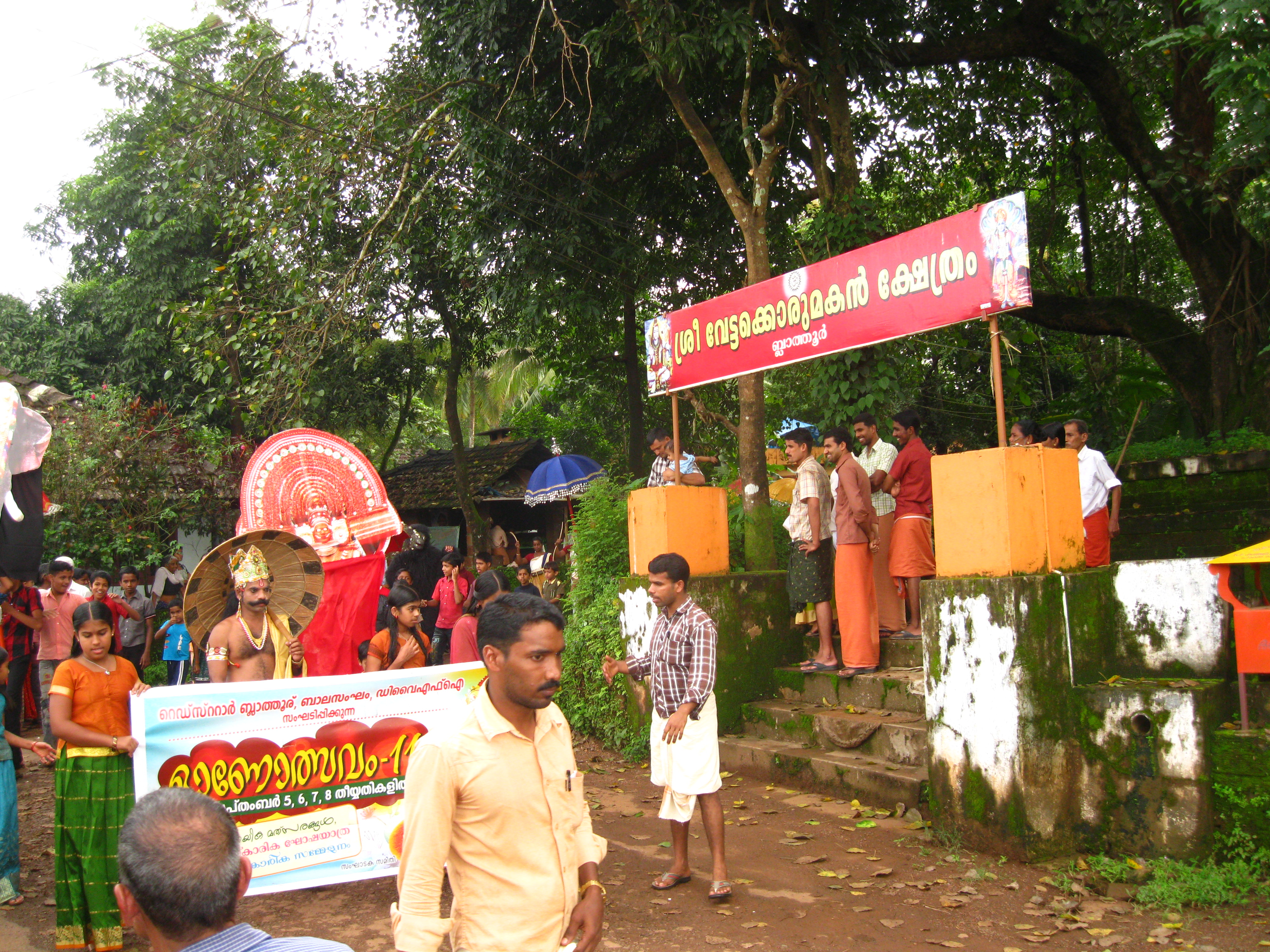
Temple in Blathur

== Historic immigrations into North Malabar ==
=== Tulu Brahmin immigration ===
In 1617, the Kolathiri Raja Udayavarman, wished to attain the higher status of kshatriya by undergoing the Hiranyagarbham ritual in honour of Hiranyagarbha, the creator of the universe. Since the Nambudiri Brahmins were not prepared for the ceremony, Udayavarman brought 237 families of Shivalli Brahmins from Gokarna in Coastal Karnataka and settled them in the five counties of Cheruthazham, Kunniriyam, Arathil, Kulappuram and Vararuchimangalam in North Malabar. The Sree Raghavapuram temple (Hanuman Kavu) at Pilathara was assigned to the 237 families for worship, and it became their village temple. The 93 Edukunchi families displaced as a result received the hereditary trusteeship of the Sreekrishnapuram temple in Cheruthazham, 62 Gunavantham families that of Arathil Sreebhadrapuram temple and the 82 Vilakkoor families that of Udayapurath Haripuram temple. These 237 families adopted the customs of local Nambudiri Brahmins and came to be referred to as Embranthiris.

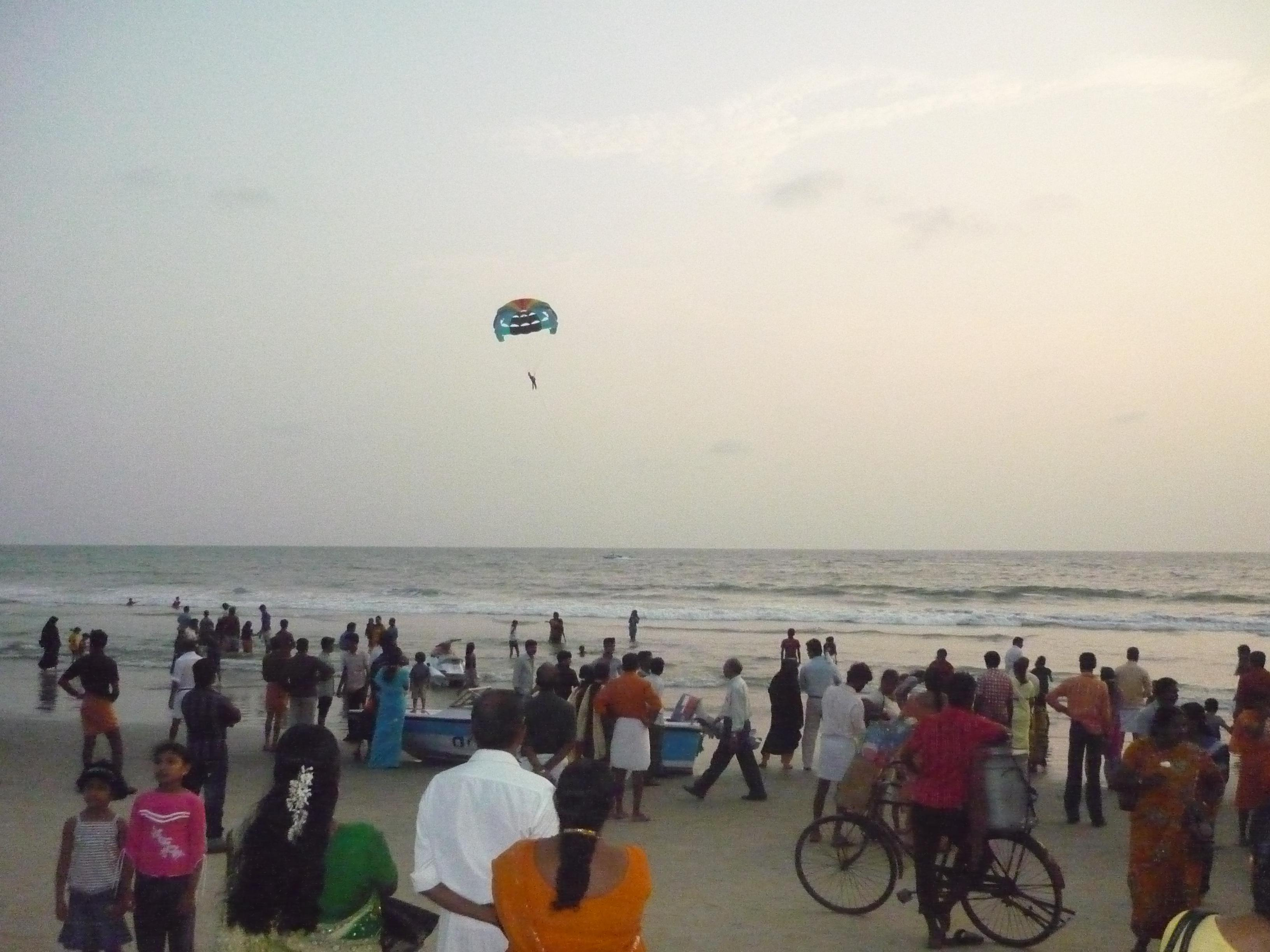
Para-sailing in progress at Payyambalam - a new initiative

=== Nasrani migration ===
The Malabar Migration refers to the large-scale migration of Syrian Christians (Nasranis) from the Travancore region to the Malabar area of northern Kerala in the 20th century. The migration started in the decades of the 20th century and continued well into the 1970s and 1980s. This migration had a significant demographic and social impact as the Syrian Christian population of Malabar increased 15-fold from 31,191 in 1931 to 442,510 in 1971.

Central Travancore had experienced a steep increase in population in the early 20th century while pressure on arable land increased. At the same time, people recognised the potential of the large uncultivated lands in the northern regions called Malabar, which was then part of the Madras Presidency under British Rule. Migration initially started in trickles with land bought from the local rulers. Huge tracts of uncultivated forest and waste land were later converted into farms and plantations. Against the odds, the community thrived, which attracted more migrants. This migration reached its peak in the 1950s.

These migrants came mostly from present day Kottayam, Idukki, Muvattupuzha and Kothamangalam with migrations happening across the entire Malabar region (north Kerala) including into the following districts of present-day Kerala (some key migration centres are also mentioned):

- Kasaragod - Malom, Kallar, Chittarikkal, Vellarikundu, Panathady, Panathur
- Kannur - Alakkode, Chemperi, Cherupuzha, Kudianmala, Iritty, Peravoor, Payyavoor, Chempanthotty
- Calicut - Thiruvambady, Kuttiady
- Malapuram - Nilambur, Edakkara, Chungathara
- Wayanad - Pulpally

The Syro-Malabar Catholic Church gave significant support to the migration by providing churches, discipline, schools, hospitals and other infrastructure.

Overall, hundreds of thousands of people moved to North Kerala. The percentage of Christian residents in these districts was small before the migration but since 1950 this settler community has formed a significant part of the population in the hill areas of these districts.

==== Immigration of Knanaya Christians ====
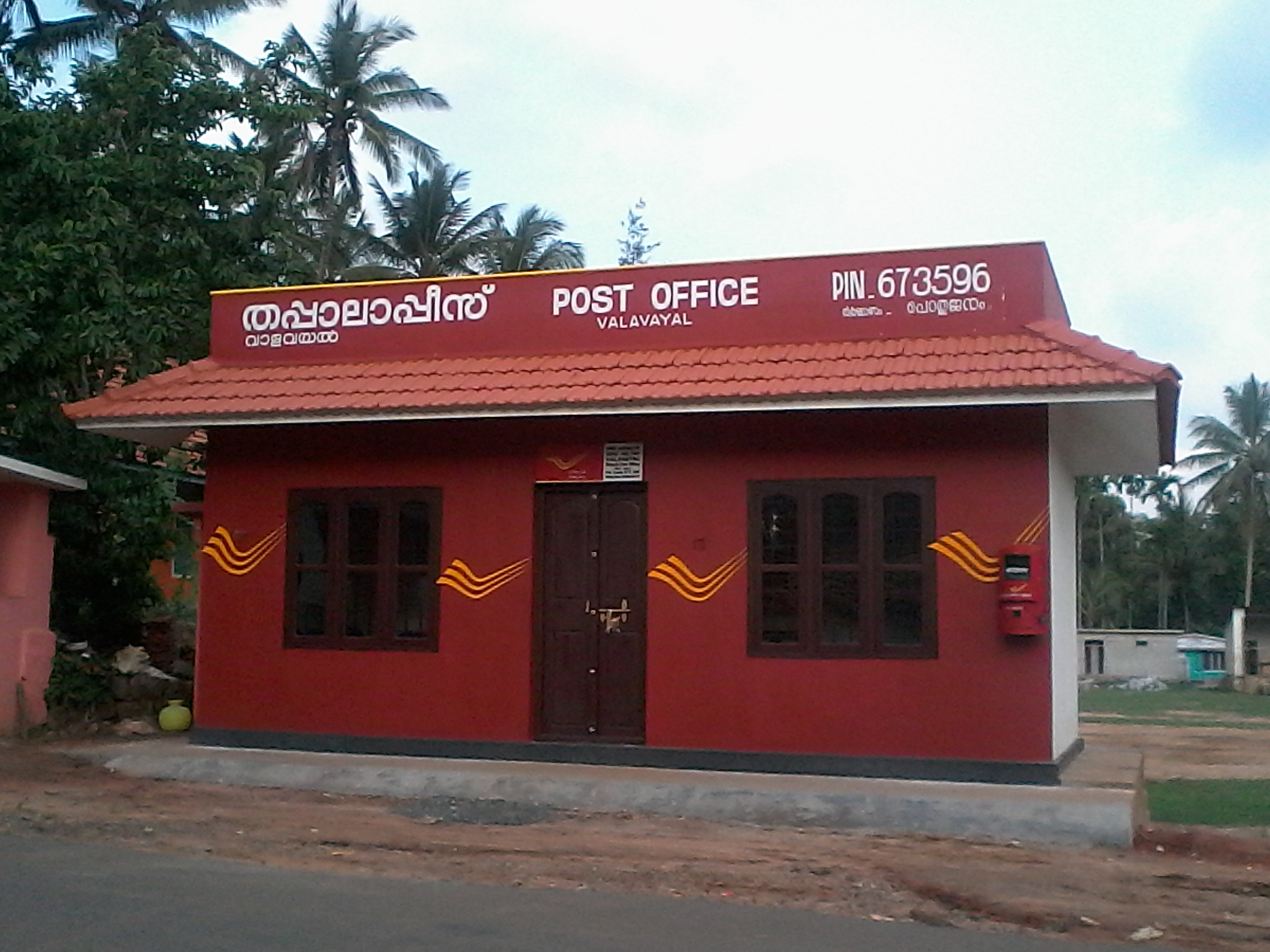
Valavayal Post Office, Wayanad

Historically, the North Malabar landlords were the largest land-holders in Kerala, but the introduction of the Kerala Land Reforms Bill in 1957 resulted in their panic selling of farm and forest land. This was followed by immigration of Christians from Knanaya into the North Malabar Region in search of virgin land to cultivate and to seek relief from the poverty and financial strain caused by the Second World War. Under the direction of Prof. V.J. Joseph Kandoth and Bishop Mar Alexander Chulaparambil, the Diocese of Kottayam bought 1,800 acres (7.3 km^{2}) of land in the Kasargod area in 1942. The new venture was announced in all the parishes of southern Kerala. Applications were invited and each family was allotted 11.5 acres (47,000 m^{2}) of land 1943. The emigrants from all southern Kerala parishes reached Cochin by boat and from there travelled by train to Shornur and Kanhangad. A team of priests, especially of the O.S.H. Society and laymen were sent ahead to prepare the ground and to receive them on their arrival. The name of the local area was changed from Echikkol to Rajapuram. In the same way, the diocese organized another settlement at Madampam near Kannur. The Diocese bought 2,000 acres (8.1 km^{2}) of land and 100 families migrated to the new area on 3 May 1943. The settlement was called Alexnagar after Bishop Mar Alexander Chulaparambil. Madathumala in Kasargod District at its eastern border with the Karnataka state was the venue of a third settlement of 45 families. The land was purchased on 26 September 1969 and the Ranipuram settlement inaugurated on 2 February 1970 dedicated to the Virgin Mary. Although there were initial difficulties due to wild animals, Ranipuram gradually prospered and today there is also a Government tourist center at Ranipuram. The Diocese of Kottayam made also arrangements with the Latin Ordinaries to have pastoral ministry and liturgical celebrations according to their own Syro-Malabar Rite. Presently, one third of the Knanaya Catholic population is in the Malabar area.

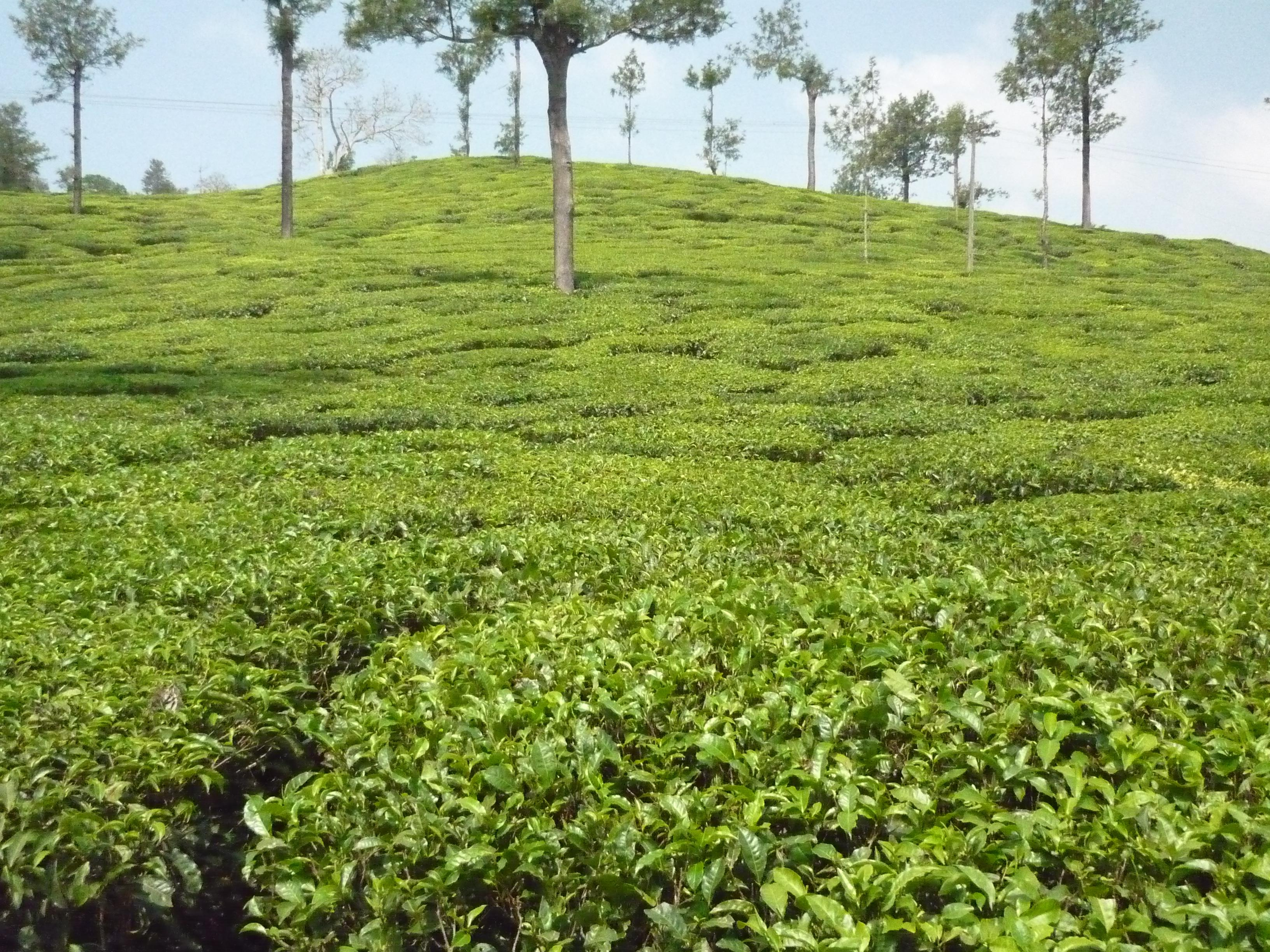
A tea estate in Mananthavady

In addition, taking advantage of the selling spree of landlords of Malabar in general and more particularly the larger landlords of North Malabar, several other Travancore Christian families immigrated into Malabar to pursue agriculture. These migrations peaked during 1960–71.

=== Immigration of teachers ===
The number of large land owning private-Tharavad-owned schools in North Malabar expanded in the first half of the twentieth century partly due to the availability of government grant-in-aid for such enterprises from 1939 onwards. Furthermore, corporate expansion of land owning Tharavads and a decrease in European engineered proletysing of the depressed classes also contributed to the growth pattern. These schools often had teaching staff from educated families. In democratic Kerala however, many of these schools evolved as public and government enterprises, which led to the recruitment of teachers from the southern provinces and the subsequent immigration of teaching staff of all ethno-religious backgrounds, many of whom preferred to settle in the area permanently.

== Historic emigrations to Southern Kerala ==
Historically significant emigration from North Malabar occurred in three phases.

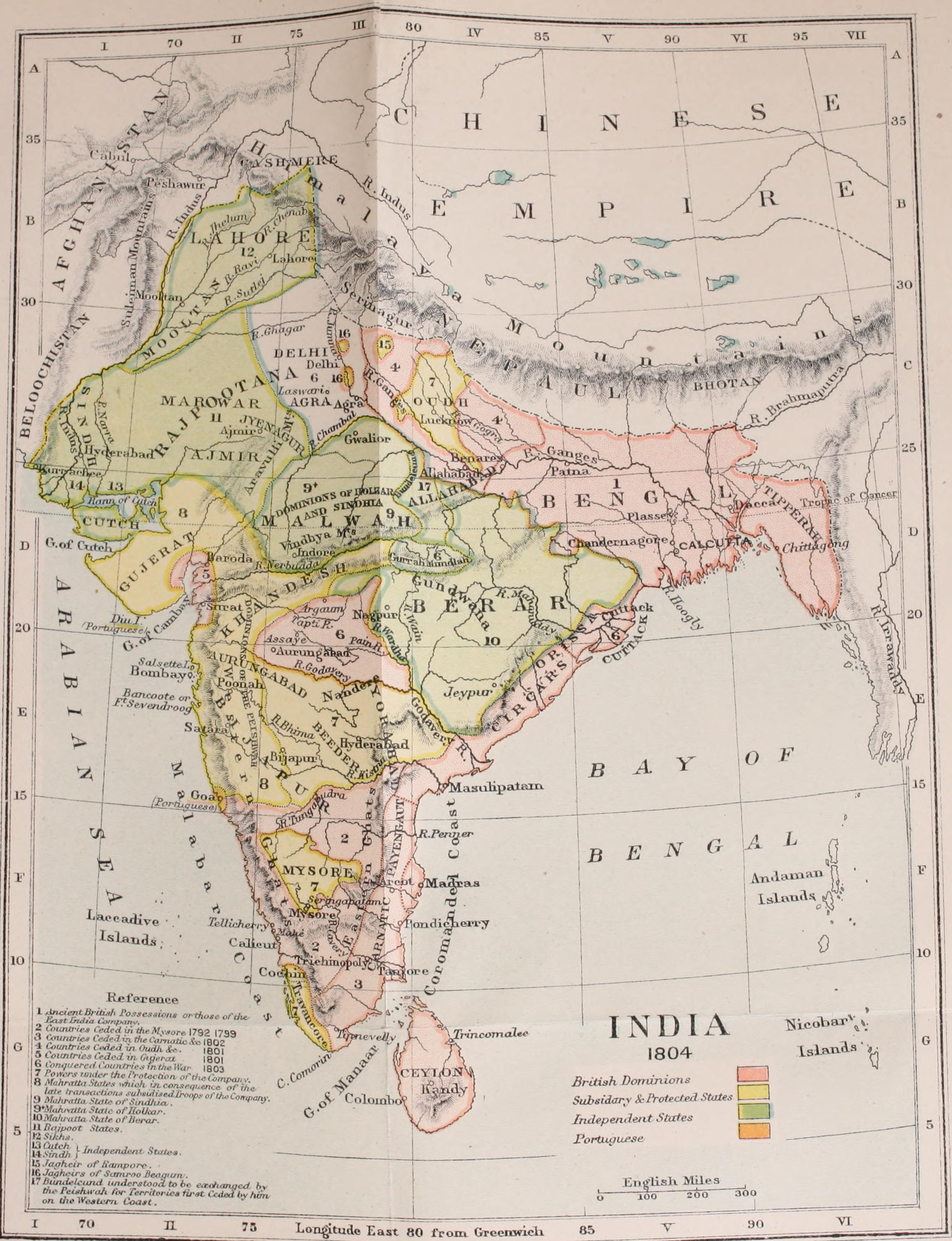
An old map of India in 1804. Note that only Thalassery, Kozhikode, and Kochi, are marked as cities within the present-day state of Kerala.

=== Dispersion of the erstwhile ruling elite ===
From 1766 to 1792, during the era of Hyder Ali and Tipu Sultan, multiple military invasions, plunder and systematic forcible religious conversions took place in both North and South Malabar. Fearing forcible conversion, a significant number of Nair Chieftains and Brahmins from Malabar chose to take refuge in the erstwhile Kingdom of Travancore, as under the Treaty of Mangalore Travancore had an alliance with the English East India Company according to which "aggression against Travancore would be viewed as equivalent to declaration of war against the English". Thus at various times between 1766 and 1792, all female members and many male members of the different royal families of North and South Malabar: Chirackal, Parappanad, and Calicut, and chieftains' families: Punnathoor, Nilambur, Kavalapara and Azhvanchery Thamprakkal (titular head of all Namboothiri Brahmins), sought asylum in Travancore and temporarily settled in different parts of the kingdom. Even after the fall of Tipu Sultan's regime in Srirangapatnam, some of the Malabar nobility, wholly or partly, preferred to remain in Travancore because of fear of atrocities if they returned home. The 17 prominent aristocratic lineages of southern Kerala that claim their origin from Malabar through displacement during this period are:

- Neerazhi Kovilakam
- Gramathil Kottaram
- Paliyakkara
- Nedumparampu
- Chempra Madham
- Ananthapuram Kottaram
- Ezhimatoor Palace
- Aranmula Kottaram
- Varanathu Kovilakam
- Mavelikkara
- Ennakkadu
- Murikkoyikkal Palace
- Mariappilly
- Koratti Swaroopam
- Kaippuzha Kovilakam
- Lakshmipuram Palace
- Kottapuram.

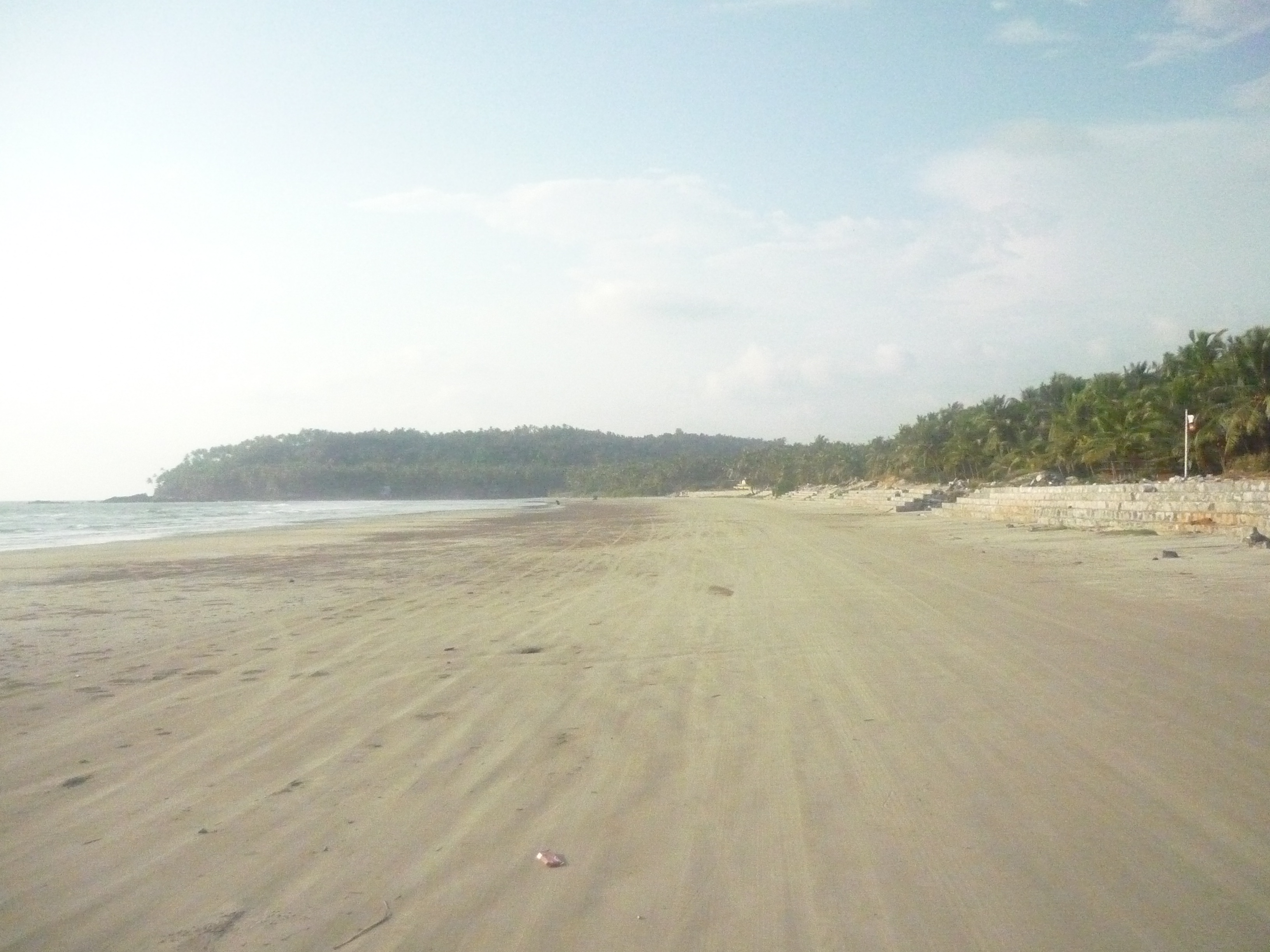
Muzhappilangad Beach - the only drive-in-beach in Kerala

=== Adoptions by the erstwhile ruling elite ===
The Kolathiris were a family descended from the Cheras and the Ay/Venad/Travancore royal family, that originated in the Thiruvananthapuram area, and settled in the Kannur region centuries ago. They had been a constant source of heirs for the Travancore royal family (and this practice of adoption was also reciprocal) by permitting some of its matrilineal branches of members to make settlements in Thiruvananthapuram and be adopted. The first adoption took place around 1310 whereby the two princesses of the Kolathiri family were installed as Senior and Junior Rānis of Attingal, with the titles of Āttingal Mootha Thampurān and Āttingal Elaya Thampurān respectively. Adoptions into the Travancore royal family followed in 1684, 1688, 1718, 1748 and 1788 until the 19th century. The celebrated Mārthanda Varma the Great was a result of the 1688 adoption and his successor Dharmarājā, who fought and defeated Tipu Sultan of Mysore, was the result of the 1718 adoption. The weak Balarama Varma who ruled after Dharmarājā in the early 19th century belonged to the 1748 line. The noted Maharanis Gowri Lakshmi Bayi and Gowri Parvati Bayi belonged to the 1788 line as did the Maharajahs Swāthi Thirunāl, Uthram Thirunāl, Āyilyam Thirunāl, Visākham Thirunāl and Moolam Thirunāl.

=== Economic migration in democratic India ===
In 1956, the State of Kerala was formed along linguistic lines, merging the Travancore, Cochin and Malabar regions. The first Kerala Legislative Assembly was formed on 1 March 1957 and the following 50 years saw migration of lawyers, politicians, businessmen and government officials from North Malabar to the southern cities of Kerala especially Cochin and Trivandrum. However many of these families still retain their links to their native area through marriage association, partial retention of natal property and often a characteristic sacerdotal North Malabar self-identity.

== Folk art ==
North Malabar has a rich history of folk-art, culture and tradition. The government of Kerala has encouraged promotion of these through the Kerala Folklore Academy at Kannur. Among the notable examples are:

=== Theyyam ===
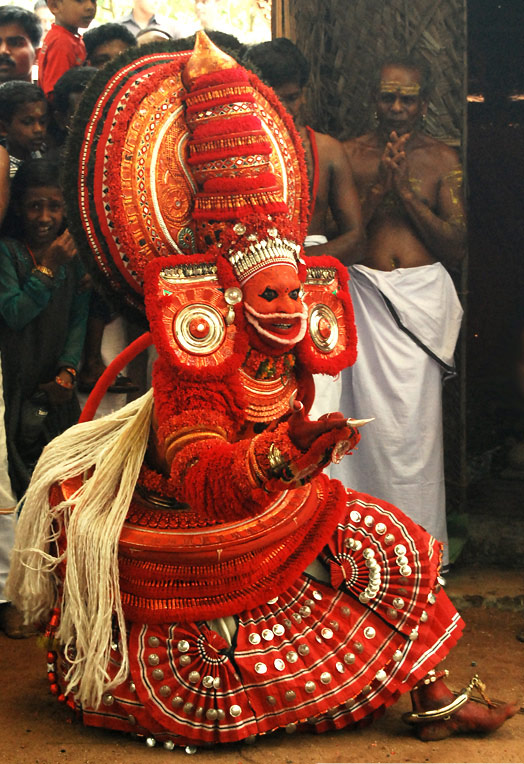

Theyyam, an ancient ritual performance art of the region in which a man is dressed symbolically as god. In the Kadathanadan area, it is known as kaliyattam. There are around 400 types of Theyyam, which are conducted on a stage and use elaborate costumes and body-painting. Each type has a distinguishing head-dress and costume made from natural materials, such as coconut leaves and bark. Musical accompaniments are provided by the chenda, elathalam and kuzhal (horn).

=== Thottam Pattu ===
Thottam Pattu is ballad sung just before performance of the Theyyam ritual.

=== Kalaripayattu ===
Kalaripayattu is a martial art that originated in North Malabar and was developed between the 9th and 12th centuries.

=== Vadakkan Pattukal ===
The Vadakkan Pattukal are ballads that extol the adventures of the brave men and women of North Malabar. Set against a feudal medieval background, the stories celebrate the valour and skills of their characters. The ballads reflect the peak of Kerala folk-poetry and are associated with Kadathanadu. The movie Oru Vadakkan Veeragatha capitalised on the popularity of these stories.

=== Thidambu Nritham ===
Thidambu Nritham (dance with the replica of the deity) is a ritual dance performed in temples. It is mainly performed by Nambudiri Brahmins and occasionally by other Brahmin communities.

=== Poorakkali ===
Poorakkali is a traditional art form performed by a group of men who dance and chant holy verses from the Ramayana or Bhagavata. It is performed during the nine-day Pooram festival in Bhagavathy temples. Payyannur, Trikaripur and nearby places like Vengara, Ramanthali, Karivellur, are well known for this art form.

=== Kolkali ===
Kolkali is an art form involving both men and women which is also seen in South Malabar too. It is the only folk art that is performed by both Hindus and Muslims, although there are slight differences in how the two do it. Muslims perform it as a form of entertainment during social gatherings and marriages, whereas the Hindus perform it at temple festivals. It involves rapid limb movements and simultaneous chanting of folksong, with the performers moving in pairs, hitting their batons (koles) against each other in a methodical way in tune with folksongs. It is played according to Vaithari or Thalam by the Gurukkal (Teacher).

The typical Kolkali group will contain between sixteen and twenty members. One among them will sing the folksong and it will be chorused by rest. Harmonizing with generational changes, Kolkali like all other folk-art of North Malabar, has also changed its look and style over time. The noted Kolkali groups are found in the Kasaragod District.

=== Mappila (Muslim) folklore ===
Mappila folklore has deep roots in the region. The major Mappila arts of Malabar region (both North and South Malabar) are :

- Oppana
- Duff Muttu
- Mappila Paattu

=== Eruthukali ===
Erutukali is a folk art popular in hilly areas of North Malabar region, which is performed by the Mavilan community on the tenth day of Malayalam month Thulam. The main character in Erutukali is a big bull which is made of bamboo sticks, straw, cloth and a wooden head.

== Malabar cuisine ==
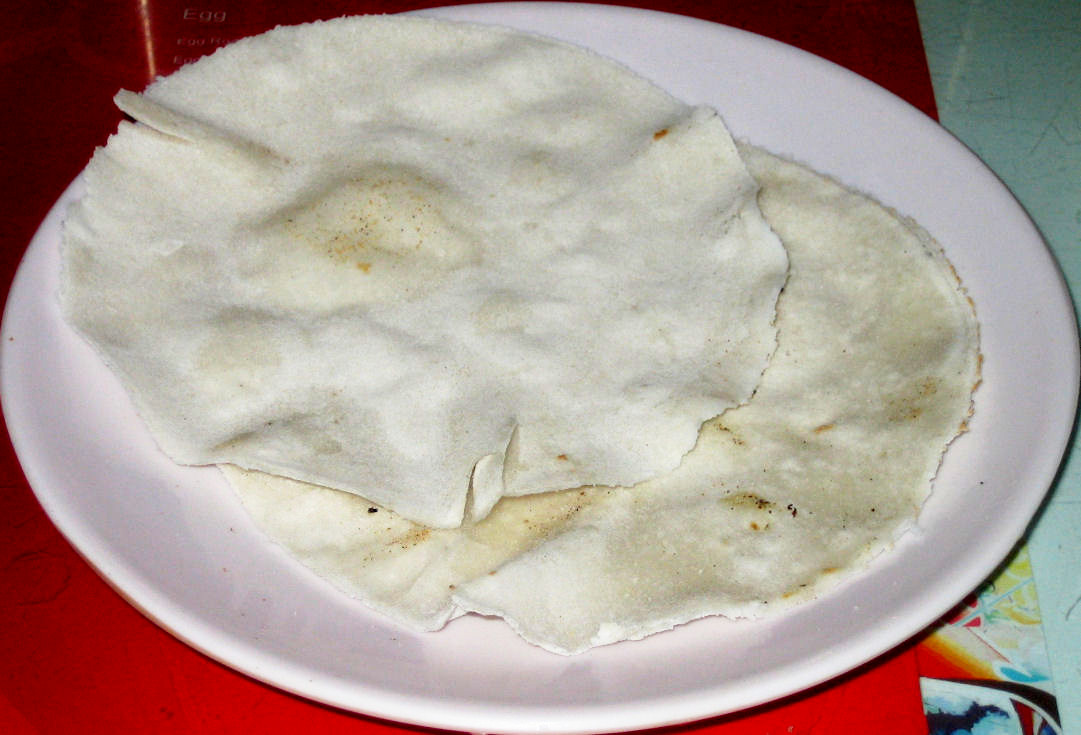
Pathiri, a pancake made of rice flour, is a common breakfast dish in North Malabar.

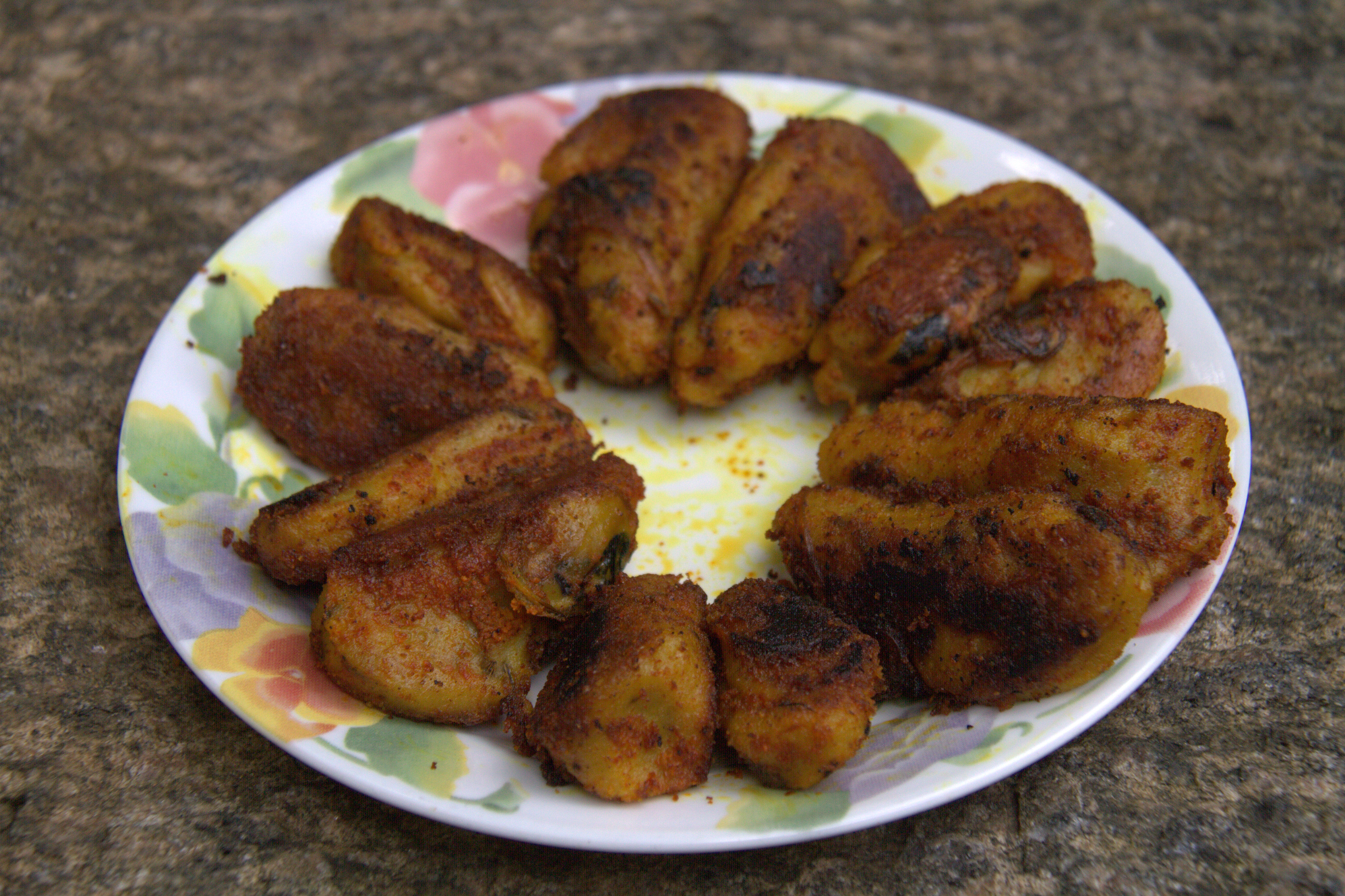
Kallummakkaya nirachathu or arikkadukka (mussels stuffed with rice)

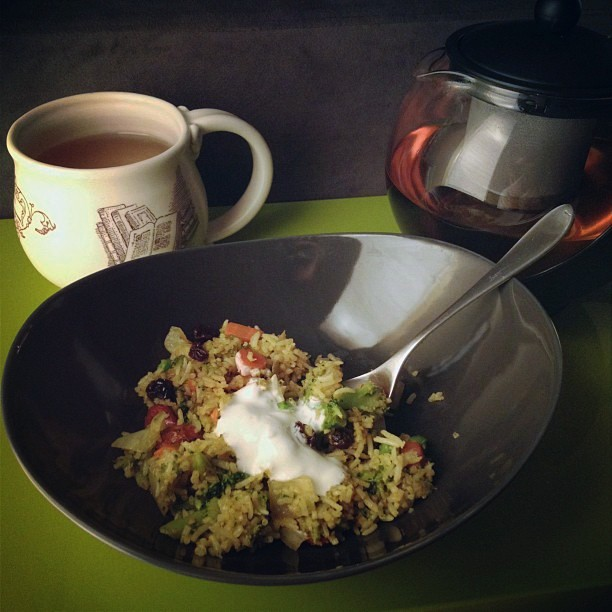
Thalassery biryani with raita

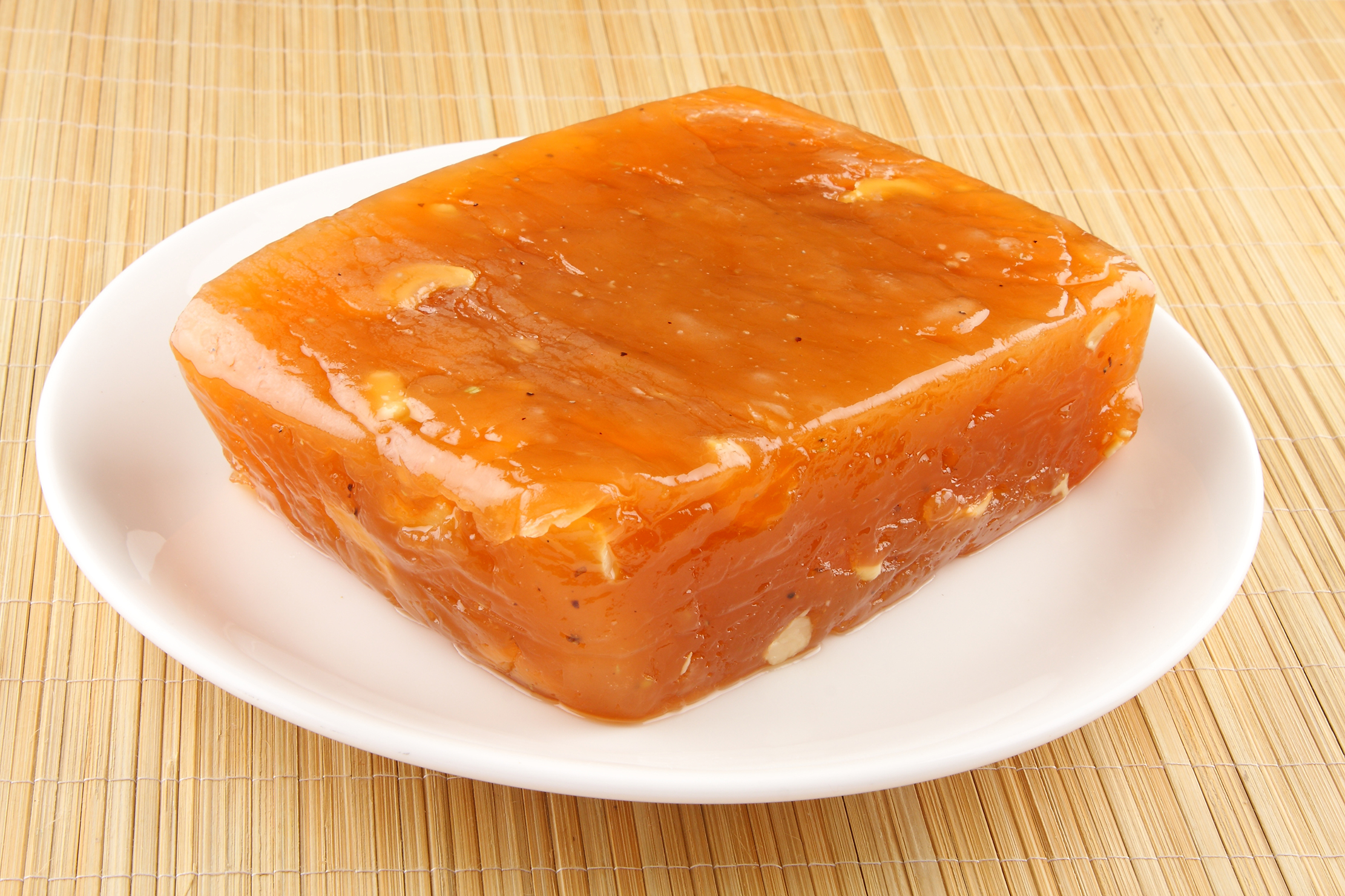
Halwas are popular in Kannur and Thalassery.

The Malabar cuisine depicts it culture and heritage. Malabar cuisine is a blend of traditional Kerala, Persian, Yemenese and Arab food culture. This confluence of culinary cultures is best seen in the preparation of most dishes. Kallummakkaya (mussels) curry, irachi puttu (irachi meaning meat), parottas (soft flatbread), Pathiri (a type of rice pancake) and ghee rice are some of the other specialties. The characteristic use of spices is the hallmark of North Malabar cuisine—black pepper, cardamom and clove are used profusely.

The Malabar version of biryani, popularly known as kuzhi mandi in Malayalam is another popular item, which has an influence from Yemen. Various varieties of biriyanis like Thalassery biriyani, and Kannur biriyani, are prepared in North Malabar.

The snacks include unnakkaya (deep-fried, boiled ripe banana paste covering a mixture of cashew, raisins and sugar), pazham nirachathu (ripe banana filled with coconut grating, molasses or sugar), muttamala made of eggs, chatti pathiri, a dessert made of flour, like a baked, layered chapati with rich filling, arikkadukka, and more.

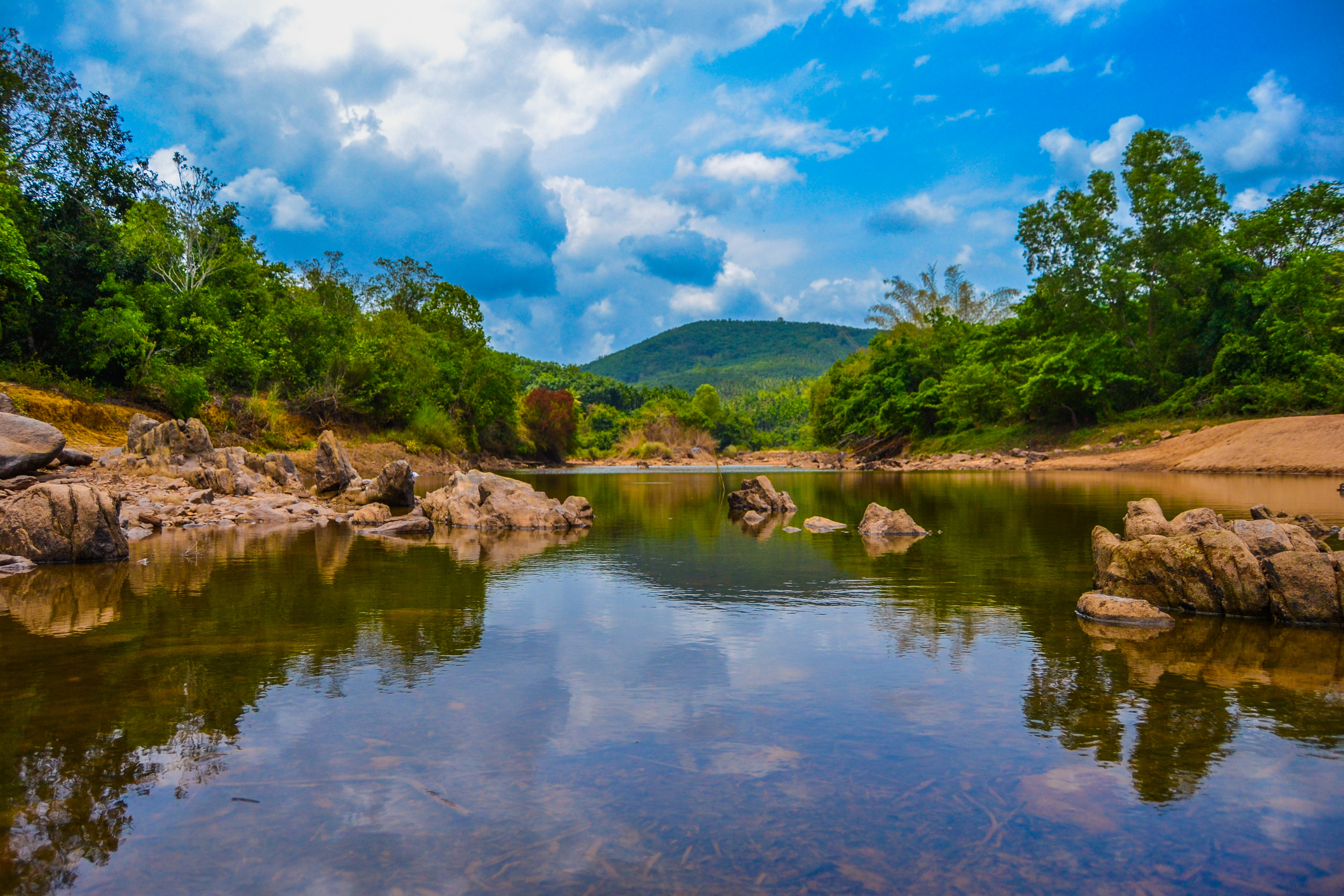
Chandragiri River - the northern end of this region

== Notable individuals ==
- Kerala Varma Pazhassi (c. 1753 - c. 1805) - popularly known as the Lion of Kerala, a prince from the royal dynasty of Kottayam which now belongs to the Kannur District of Kerala State. He waged war against Mysore and the British for 27 years
- K. Kelappan - founder president of the Nair Service Society who later became the principal of a school run by the society; revolutionary, social reformer and crusader for justice to the backward classes; was called Kerala Gandhi
- P. T. Usha - first Indian sprinter to reach the Olympics, winner of several gold medals in the Asian Games
- Lt Gen Satish Nambiar - recipient of a Vir Chakra and Force Commander of UNPROFOR
- E. K. Nayanar (December 1918 - May 2004) - born in Kalliasseri, prominent Indian political leader of the Communist Party of India (Marxist); held the post of Chief Minister of Kerala three times; the longest-serving Chief Minister of Kerala, serving a total of 4009 days
- K. Karunakaran (July 1918 - December 2010) - Indian politician from Chirakkal in the Kannur District; held the post of Chief Minister of Kerala four times, making him the person who became the Chief Minister for the most number of times, and was also the second longest-serving Chief Minister of Kerala after Nayanar
- Pinarayi Vijayan - veteran Communist leader, former State secretary of Communist Party of India (Marxist) and former Chief Minister of Kerala
- Vijay K. Nambiar - former ambassador to China and Pakistan and former Chef de Cabinet (Chief of Staff) under UN Secretary-General Ban Ki-moon
- Gireesh Puthenchery - lyricist and screenwriter in the Malayalam film industry
- T. V. Chandran - director in the Malayalam film industry
- Vineeth - South Indian film actor and classical dancer
- M. N. Nambiar (1919—2008) - film actor in Tamil cinema who spent more than 50 years in the film industry
- Vengayil Kunhiraman Nayanar (1861–1914) - Malayali journalist, essay writer, critic and short story writer born into the chieftain family of "Vengayil", Chirakkal Taluk; a close friend of Dr. Hermann Gundert and William Logan, researchers on the history, language, culture of Kerala
- Kannavath Sankaran Nambiar - Minister of Pazhassi Raja who was active in resistance to Mysorean and British invaders
- Sreenivasan - Malayalam actor and director
- Samvrutha Sunil - Malayalam film heroine
- Kavya Madhavan - Malayalam film actress
- O. M. Nambiar - Indian athletics coach
- M Kunjikannan - Kunjikannan master, journalist, Gandhian, educational and social activist.
- Kodiyeri Balakrishnan - Home Minister in the V.S. Achuthanandan ministry from 2006 to 2011, and former State secretary of Communist Party of India (Marxist)
- Kanayi Kunhiraman - sculptor
- M. Mukundan - novelist and diplomat
- K. Raghavan - Malayalam music director
- Abu Salim - film actor and Mr India Title winner in 1984 and 1992
- C. P. Krishnan Nair - businessman from the Leela Group of Hotels
- Sanusha - film actress
- Anaswara Rajan - film actress
- Maliyekkal Mariyumma - social reformer
- Mattannur Sankarankutty Marar - noted Chenda player

== See also ==
- Malabar pepper
- Kolathiri
- South Malabar
- North Malabar Gramin Bank
