= List of Mappila dishes =

This is a list of Mappila dishes, the food of the Mappila (Muslim) community of the Malabar Coast in northern Kerala, India. Mappila cuisine grew from local Malabar cooking combined with West Asian influences carried by the spice trade, and it is known for biryanis, breads, and a large range of fried and sweet snacks. It is predominantly non-vegetarian, using chicken, mutton, beef and seafood, and it uses spices such as cardamom, cinnamon, cloves, fennel and pepper.. For sweet snacks, banana and egg are commonly used.

== Background ==
Rice-flour bread called pathiri is central to the cuisine and appears in many forms, and ethnographic accounts note dozens of pathiri varieties. Many sweet and fried items are eaten as afternoon snacks or during iftar in Ramadan, and elaborate dishes are served for wedding feasts. One of the best-known dishes, Thalassery biryani, is made with short-grain Kaima (Jeerakasala) rice rather than basmati and is very popular in North Kerala.

== Dishes ==
Dish	Malayalam	Image	Description
Thalassery biryani	തലശ്ശേരി ബിരിയാണി		A biryani made with short-grain Kaima or Jeerakasala rice, ghee-fried and slow-cooked by the dum method, seasoned with fennel and pepper.
Pathiri	പത്തിരി		A soft flatbread of rice flour eaten with curries; varieties include ari pathiri, neypathiri (fried), meen pathiri (fish-filled) and irachi pathiri (meat-stuffed).
Chatti pathiri	ചട്ടിപ്പത്തിരി		A layered dish of egg-dipped pancakes stacked with spiced meat or a sweet filling and baked, likened to lasagne; served at weddings and during Ramadan.
Unnakaya	ഉന്നക്കായ		A deep-fried sweet of mashed ripe plantain wrapped around a filling of grated coconut, cashew and raisins.
Kai pola	കായ്‌പോള		A baked pudding of ripe banana and egg.
Mutta mala	മുട്ടമാല		A wedding sweet of egg-yolk threads set in sugar syrup; its white counterpart made from egg white is called muttasurka.
Arikkadukka	അരിക്കടുക്ക		Mussels stuffed with a spiced rice batter, then steamed and fried.
Kallummakkaya fry	കല്ലുമ്മക്കായ വറുത്തത്		Green mussels, farmed off the Kozhikode-Thalassery coast, coated and fried.
Aleesa	അലീസ		A thick porridge of wheat cooked with meat, related to West Asian harees.
Pazham nirachathu	പഴം നിറച്ചത്		Ripe plantain stuffed with grated coconut and jaggery and fried.

== See also ==
- Thalassery cuisine
- Kerala cuisine
- List of Indian dishes
