= Thalassery cuisine =

Culinary traditions of Thalassery, Kerala

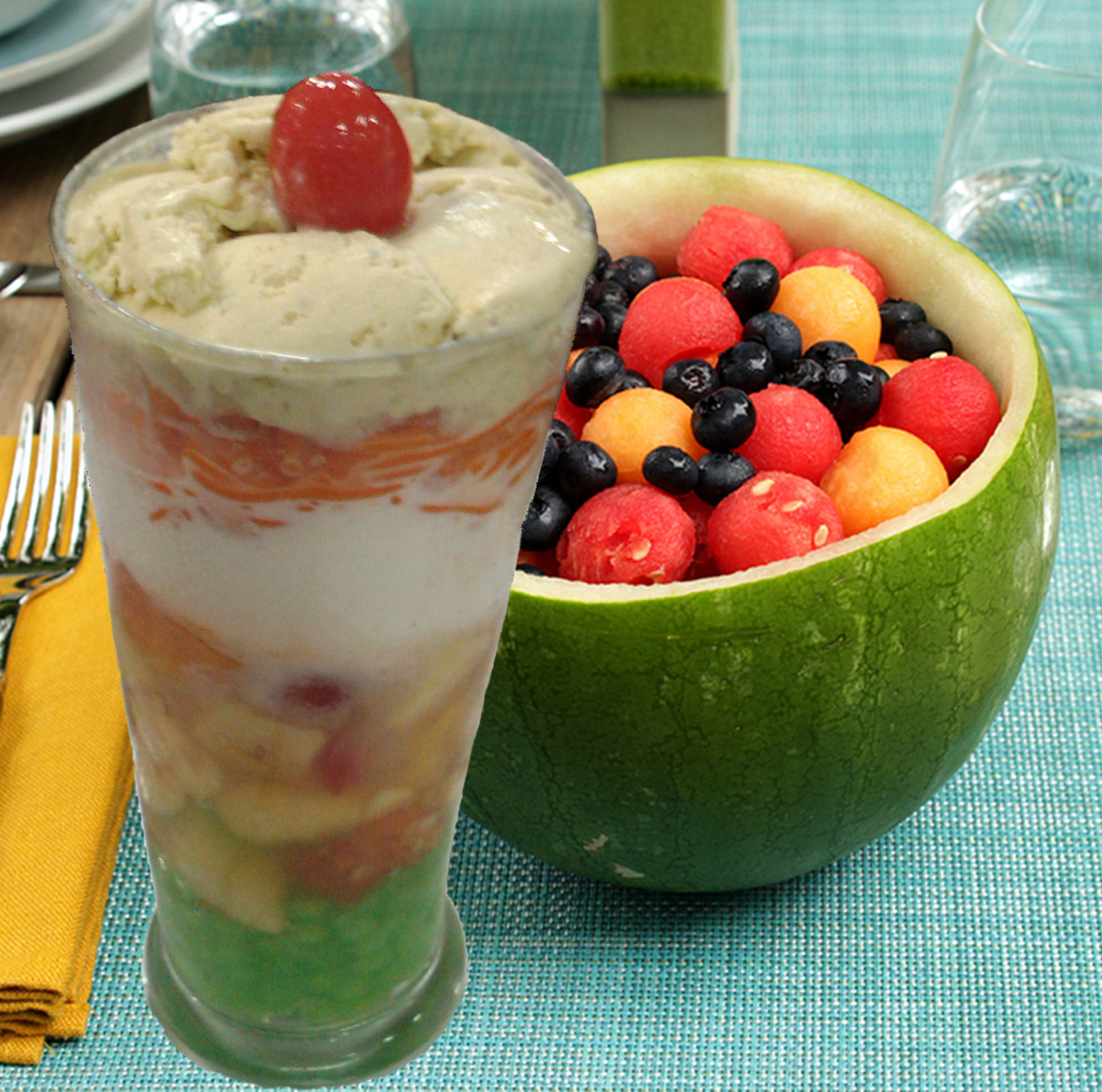
- Thalassery faloodha
- Place of origin: India
- Region or state: Kerala

Thalassery cuisine refers to the distinct cuisine from Thalassery city of northern Kerala, which has incorporated Indian, Persian, Arabian and European styles of cooking as a result of its long history as a maritime trading post.

Thalassery is known for its Thalassery biryani (in local dialect, biri-yaa-ni). Unlike other biryani dishes, Thalassery biryani is made using kaima (also known as jeerakasala), an Indian aromatic rice, instead of the usual basmati rice.

Influences of Mughal culture are evident.

Thalassery also occupies a special place in the modern history of Kerala as the pioneer of its bakery industry, since the first bakery was started by Mambally Bapu in 1880 and Western-style cakes were introduced in 1883.

== Malabar cuisine ==
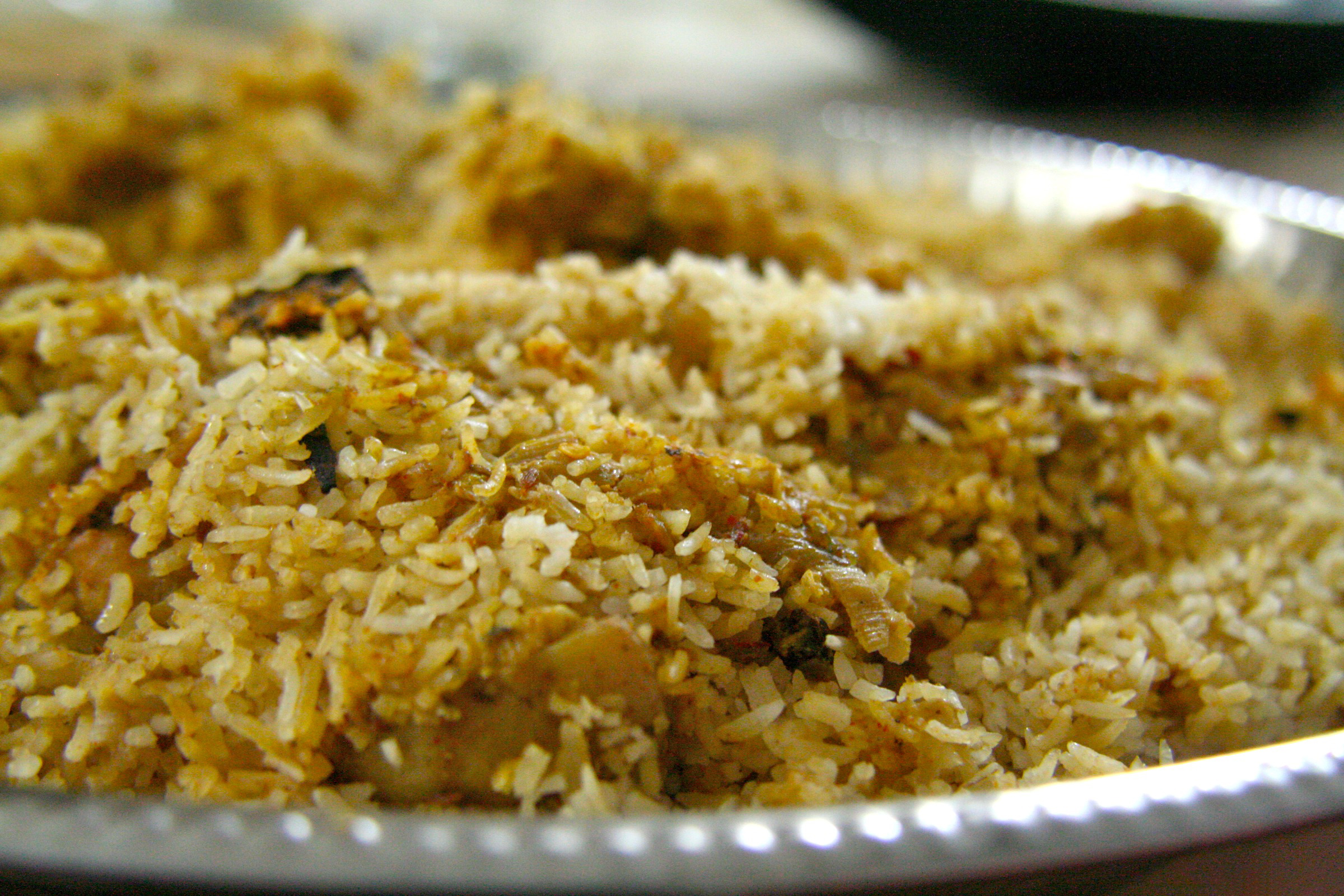
Thalassery biryani prepared

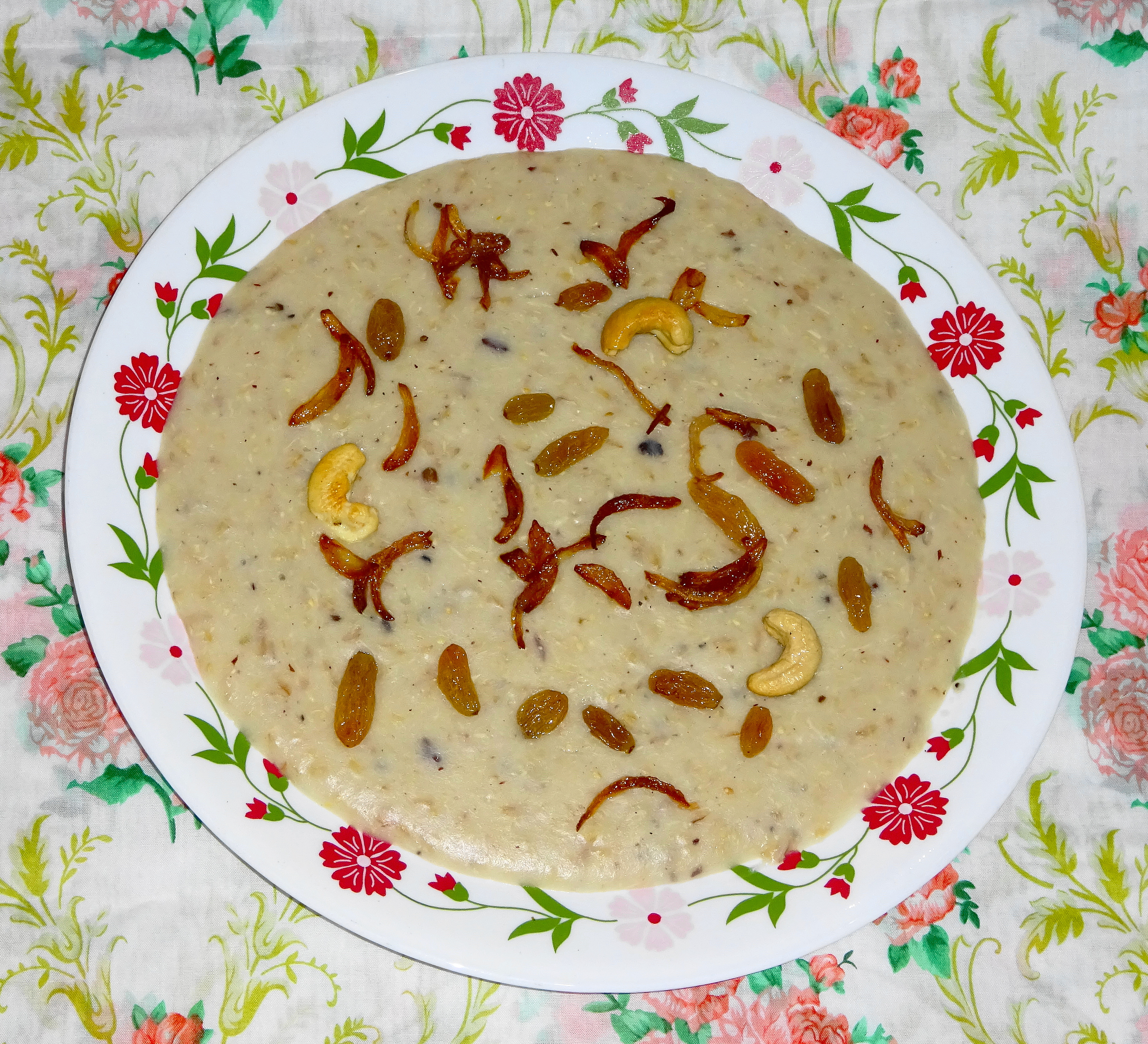
Aleesa (അലീസ), a sweet Ramadan dish that fuses Arabian and Malabar cuisine; in the past, Malabari people introduced this dish even to Karachi, now in Pakistan

There are broadly two classes of non-vegetarian cuisine in Kerala: Malabar cuisine, which is from North Kerala, and Syrian-Christian cuisine which is from the South (Travancore and Kochi regions).

The two are clearly distinct: the former has Mughlai-Arab, Portuguese, British, Dutch, and French influences and the latter includes a mix of Kerala traditional dishes rich in coconut, as well as various recipes of Syrian, Jewish, Dutch, Portuguese and British origin.

Most dishes of Malabar cuisine, including Thalassery biryani, involve frying in ghee.

There are sweet and spicy variants and they are predominantly non-vegetarian. Some typical examples include ari pathiri, chatti pathiri, kallummakaya (mussels) fry, arikkadukka (stuffed fried mussels) and biryanis with chicken, mutton, prawns, fish and egg, as well as sweeteners such as aleesa and Kadalapparippu ada. The sweeteners are mostly used as snacks to be consumed in the afternoon or early evening. Biryani was introduced into the region due to Islamic influence and the recipe gradually evolved into Thalassery biryani. Biryani is traditionally seen only as an occasional serving and not as staple food.

== Thalassery faloodha ==
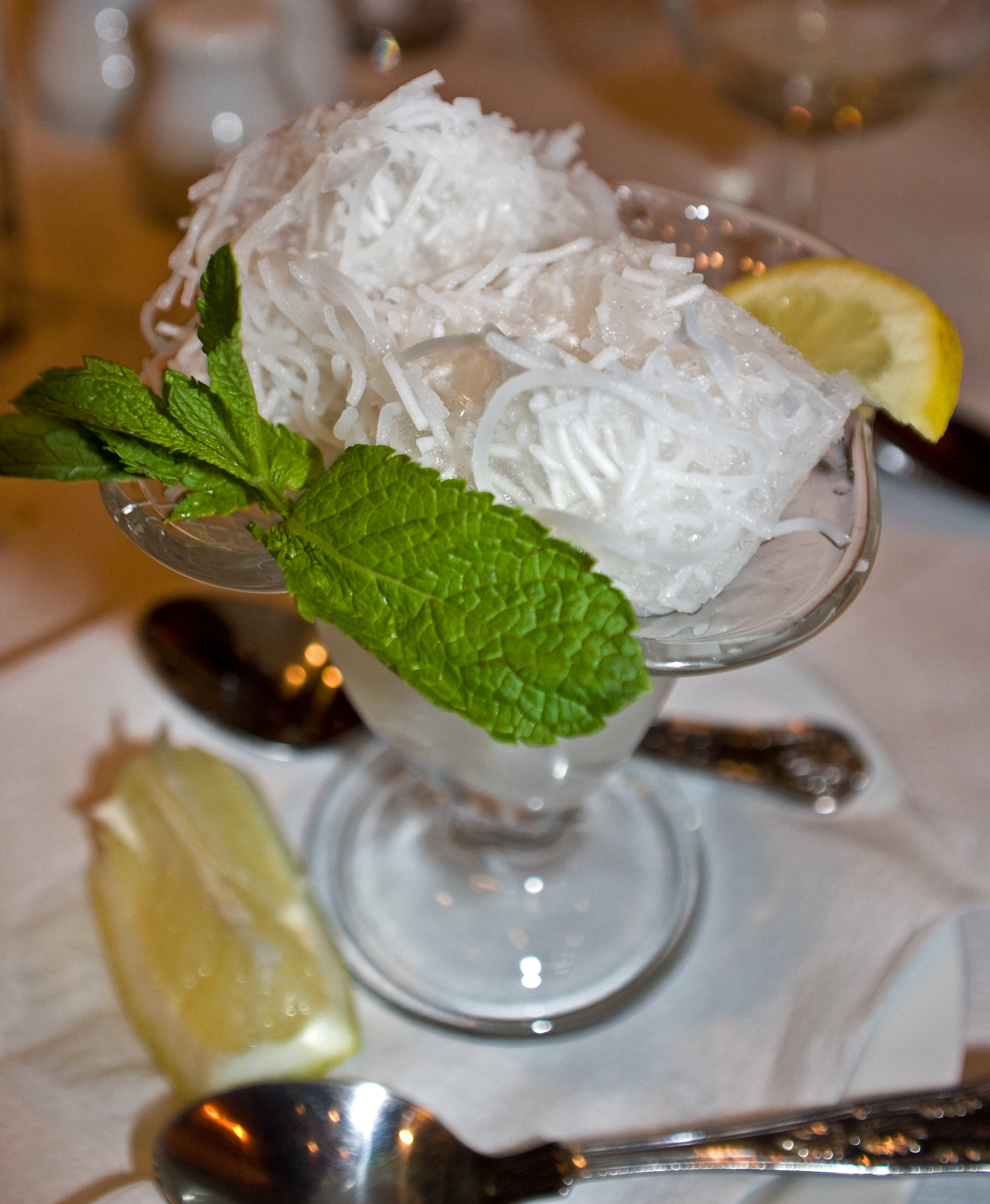
Persian faloodeh

Thalassery faloodha is a regional variant of the Persian dessert faloodeh. This is a cocktail of fruit salad, dry fruits such as raisins, pistachios, cashews, almonds (badam), rose milk, and vanilla ice cream.

== Green mussel dishes ==
The Asian green mussel (Perna viridis) is favored in Thalassery dishes. The mussel is called Kallu-mma-kaya (fruit on the stone) or kadukka. They grow on rocky surfaces in the Arabian Sea.

Other dishes include kallummakaya porichathu (fried mussel), arikkadukka (stuffed-in-shell mussel, steamed and fried), kallumakkaya ularthiyath (mussel stir-fry), kallumakkaya varattiyathu (mussel pickles). Elambakka (clams) are also popular.

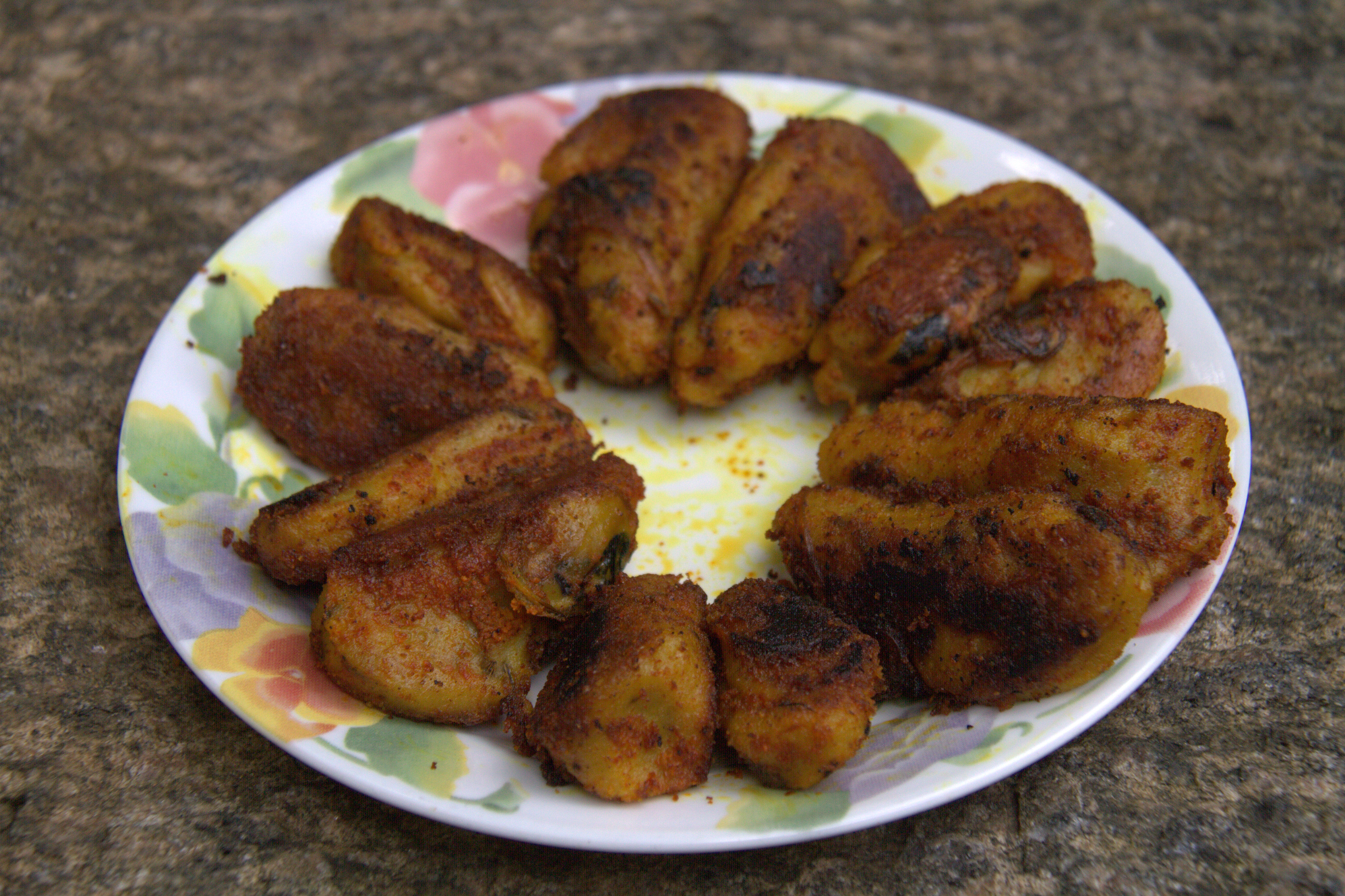
Kallummakkaya nirachathu or arikkadukka (mussels stuffed with rice)

The green mussels'popularity led farmers to employ aquaculture in local rivers to increase supplies. Thalassery natives are known for their generous hospitality towards guests.

== Thalassery snacks ==
Another Thalassery dish is kozhi-kkalu, made with sliced tapioca. Pappadam-pazham kuzhakkal and aval um poriyum kuzhakkal are other popular dishes.

Muttamala, taripola, pazham nirachatu (fried banana filled with grated coconut sugar or jaggery), unnakaya, jaayi pola, chatti pathiri and ari pathiri are other local dishes.

Porridges such as mutaari kachiyatu (ragi porridge), are popular.

Muttamala and muttasirka are traditional sweets made using egg, where muttamala is yellow noodle-like made of egg-yolk and muttasirka is white-colored, made of egg whites. Typically, muttamala is spread over pieces of muttasirka, and they are further adorned with cherries.

Unnakkai (ഉന്നക്കായ്‌) also known as unnakaya, unnakka, kaai ada, and kaai porichathu, is a spindle-shaped sweet dessert made of plantains. It is a famous snack often served at weddings, Iftar parties and other festivities. It is prepared by stuffing plantain with flavored coconut (and optionally with egg) and fried in ghee.

Chatti pathiri is similar to lasagne where layers of spiced (masala) beef or chicken mixture are placed between layers of egg-dipped pancakes and baked in oven. It is especially served in Malabar Muslim weddings and reception parties.

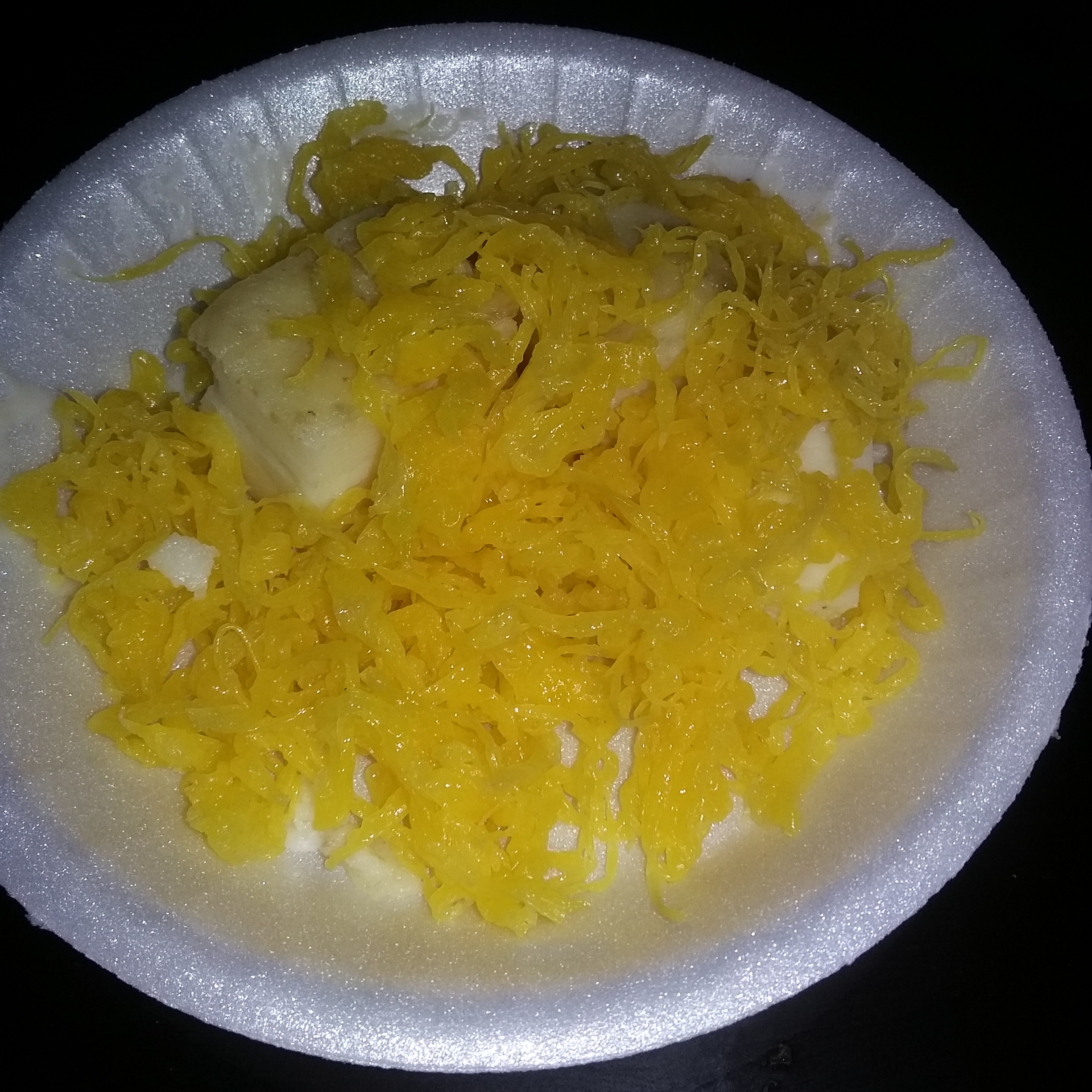
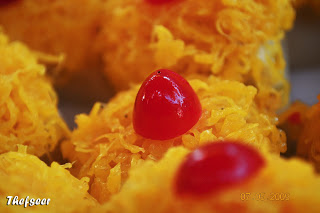
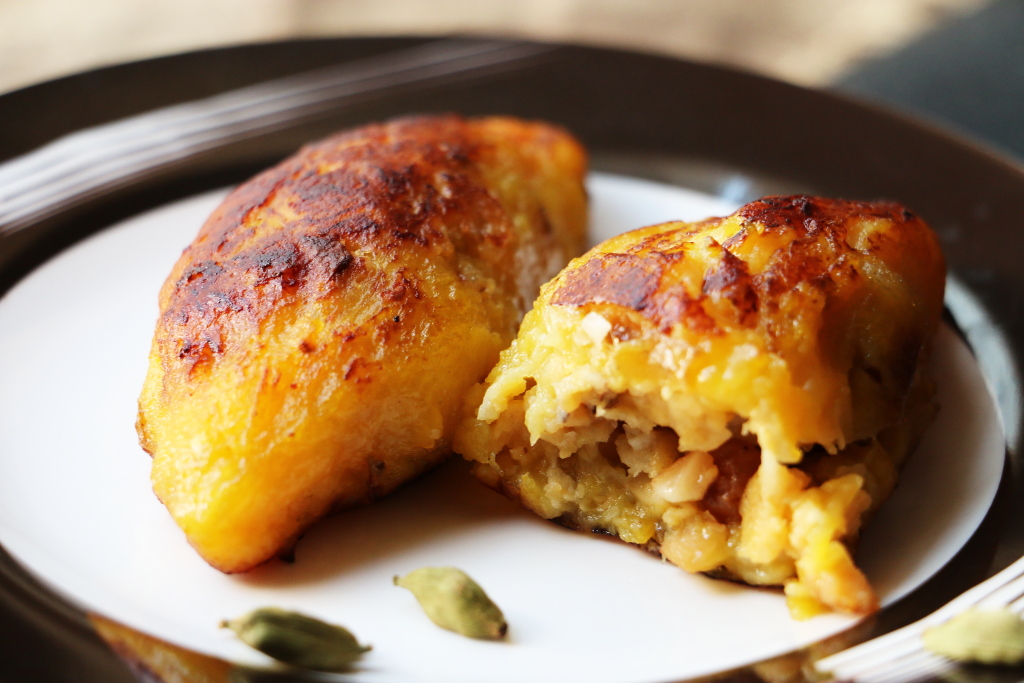
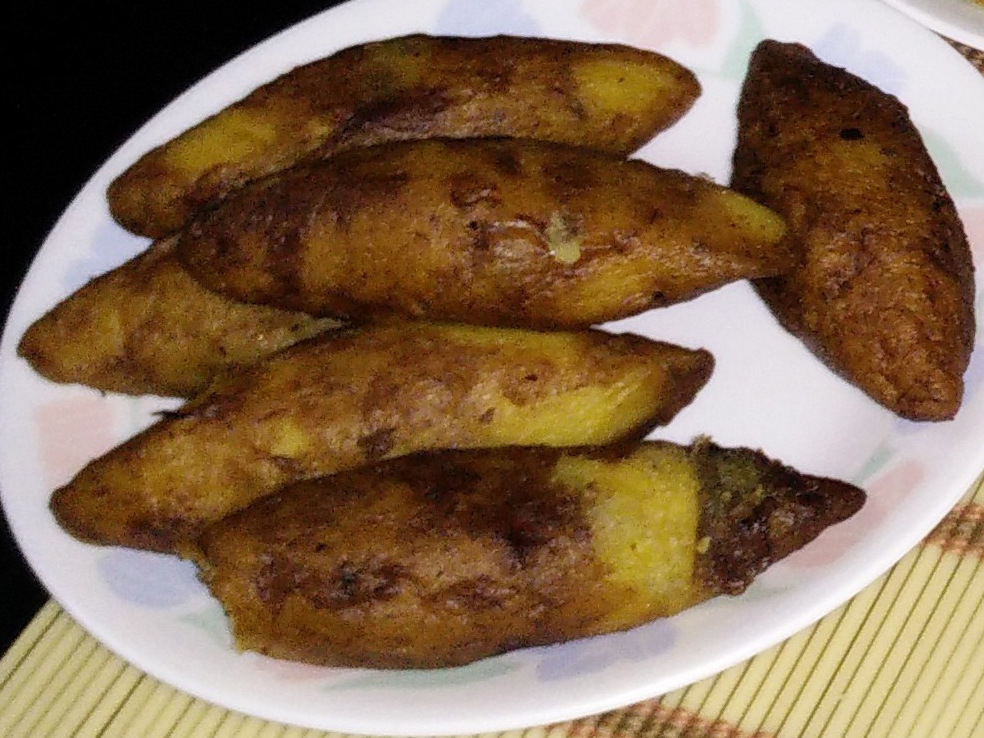
Various snacks (muttamala, muttamala spread over muttasirka with cherries, unnakkai with coconut filling)
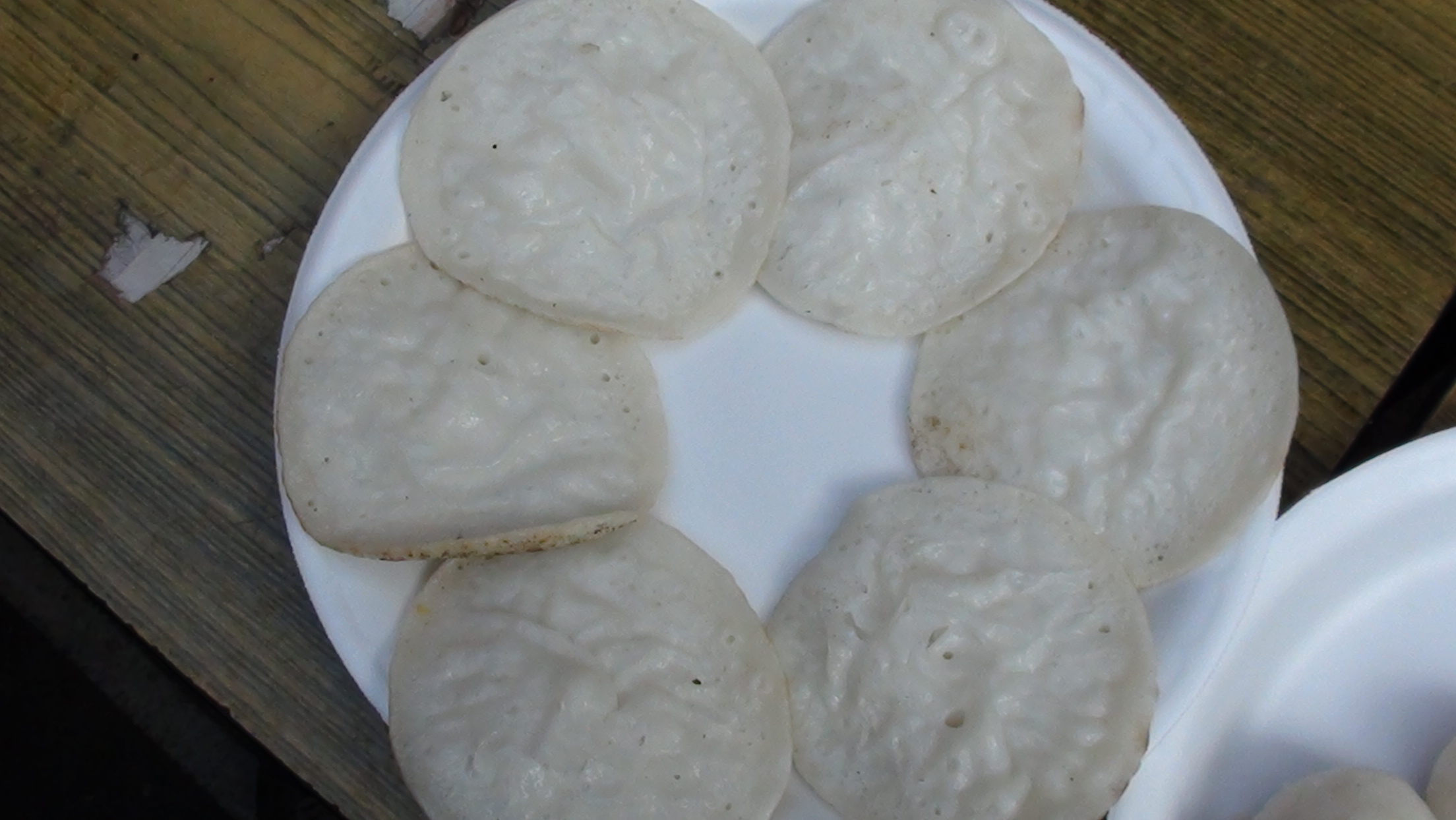
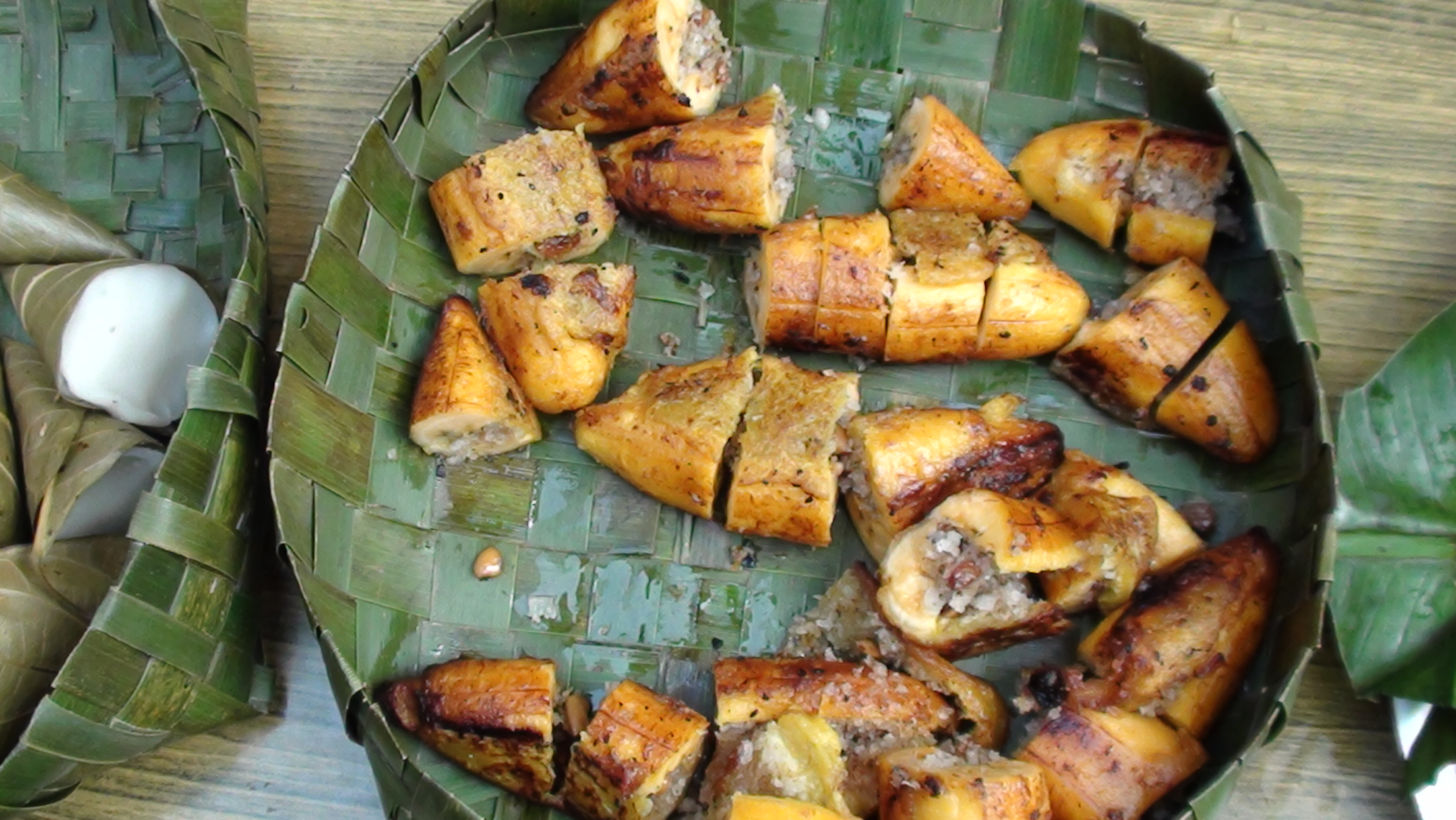
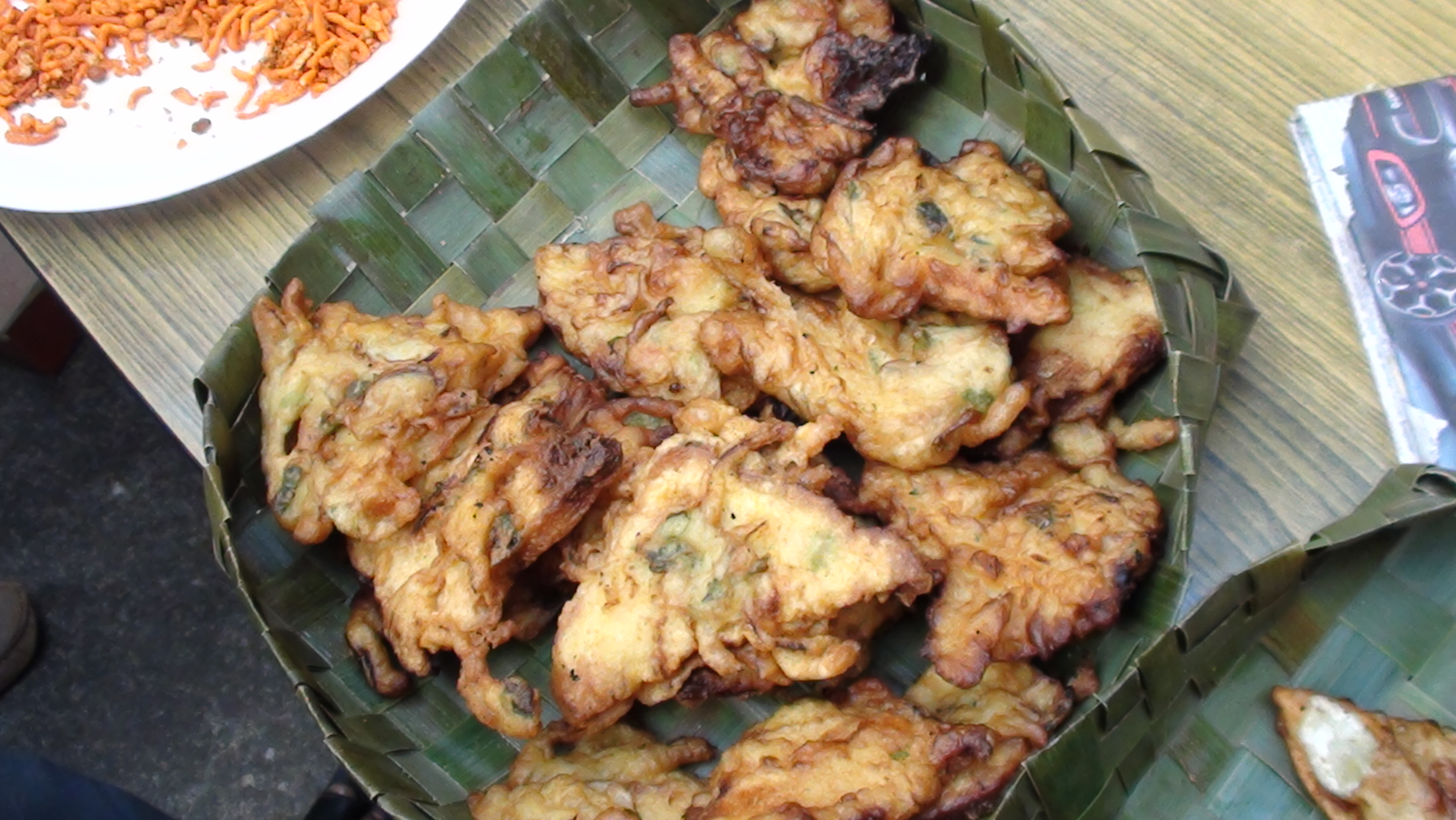
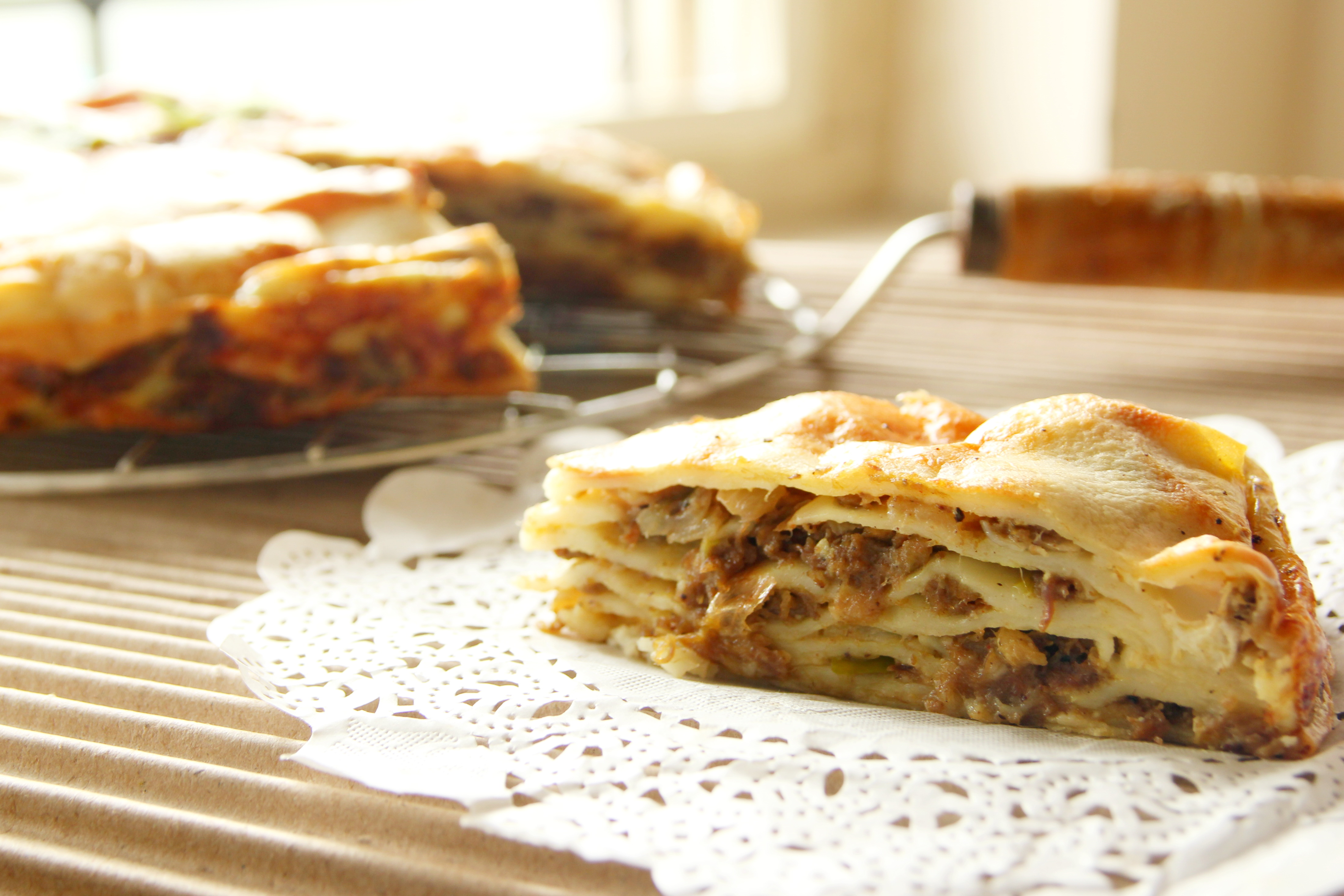
Various snacks (ottada, pazham nirachath, bread mukkiporichath and chatti pathiri)

== Thalassery biryani ==
Thalassery biryani is a rice-based (Note: Thalassery biryani uses only Kaima/Jeerakasala rice, and does not use basmati rice. Basmati rice is used for variations such as Hyderabadi biryani) dish blended with spices and chicken. As it is the only biryani recipe in Kerala cuisine, (Note: (Author)Pratibha Karan; (Title) Biriyani (2009); Topic: List of biriyanis by location. Thalassery biryani is the only biryani variant mentioned in the Kerala section, the rest of the recipes being variations based on change of meat like mutton, prawns, chicken, fish, egg, etc. Variations of the dish may include mutton, fish, eggs or vegetables.) it can also be called Kerala biryani. Thalassery biryani is the only type of biryani in Kerala using Kaima rice.

Other types of biryani with different ingredients that use the same rice and preparation methods are kannur biriyani, malappuram biriyani, ponnani biriyani, kochi kayees biriyani, calicut biriyani, kochi mint biriyani and alapuzha biriyani.

The main difference between Thalassery biryani and other biryanis is that Thalassery biryani uses only khaima/jeerakasala rice—a short-grain, thin rice which is also called biryani rice in Kerala. The dish does not use basmati rice.

Biryani is an exotic dish of Mughal origin, but this variant is an indigenous recipe of Malabar. It is a symbol of the cultural amalgamation of Mughal and Malabari cuisines. The Mughals brought the cuisine of biryani from Samarkand, and later variations of biryani developed in different parts of India.

Thalassery biryani may have come to the region because of the influence of the Muslim rulers of Mysore and Arkot.

Thalassery biryani is a cultural embodiment and is reminiscent of foreign influences in Malabar; it is a reminder of the Mughal-Arab cultural influence in North Kerala due to the trade that lasted for many centuries before the 1900s and the emigration to the Middle East of locals from the 1970s onwards. [The Thalassery] sea port was an export trade centre for spices where a convergence of European, Arab and Malabar cultures occurred.

=== Etymology ===
The name "Thalassery biryani" (Malayalam: തലശ്ശേരി ബിരിയാണി, Tamil: தலச்சேரி பிரியாணி, Hindi: त लश्शेरि बिरयानी, Arabic: برياني تلشیری) originates from Thalassery, a town in the coastal Malabar region in North Kerala, India. The word "biryani" is derived from the Persian word biryān (n) (بریان) which means "fried" or "roasted". Biryani was believed to have been invented in the kitchens of the Mughal Emperors; Thalassery biryani is one of many ways of preparing biryani dishes. In the local dialect-Malayalam, there is a small variation in pronunciation. It is called "biri-yaa-ni" instead of "bir-yani".

=== Historical and cultural influences ===
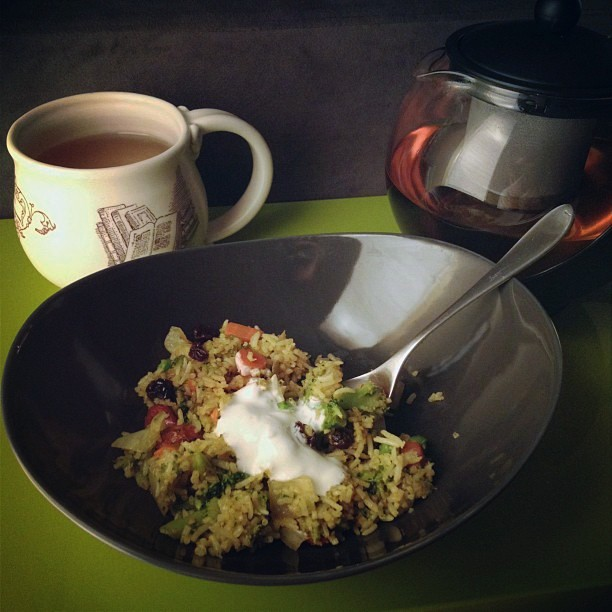
Thalassery biryani with thairu

Thalassery biryani is a strong indication of Islamic cultural influence in the region. The dish is traditional Mappila (Malabar Muslims) or Malabar cuisine. Ancient written records, except in a few treatises by historians, citing the origin of Mappilas are rare.

The stories about the conversion of the last Chera Emperor Cheraman Perumal (Rama Varma Kulasekhara Perumal) to Islam from Mahodayapuram (Kodungallur) by Malik Deenar and the subsequent conversion of Perumal's sister and nephew residing in Dharmadam (a village located north of Thalassery) are generally believed to be the origin of Islam in North Malabar.

Perumal is believed to have left Kerala from an erstwhile feudal province in the region named Poyanad (Poya Nadu, "The province from whence he left") which lies in between the Thalassery and Kannur taluks (governed by local chieftains named Randuthara Achanmar before 1947).

Perumal's nephew Mahabali, is believed to be the first Ali Raja of the Arakkal kingdom (the Sultanate of Lakshadweep and Cannanore), the sole Muslim kingdom of Kerala. The Arakkal kingdom controlled Dharmadam until the formation of Kerala state on 1 November 1956.

The legend shows that these incidents had a significant impact in the introduction of Islamic culture to Thalassery.

In the ancient times, Thalassery—an erstwhile seaport in North Malabar—was geographically in the convergence point of three regional provinces, Chirakkal, Kottayam and Kadathanad. It was also the end point of the "Perya pass" coming from the eastern hilly areas of Coorg and Wayanad making it an important trade center of spices in Malabar.

Arab traders, Arkot rulers and the invasion of Sultanate of Mysore were other important factors which introduced and developed various Islamic culture in the region.

During the Muslim holy month of Ramzan, Malabar dishes are made in abundant varieties. The Muslim community of Malabar differs culturally; the lifestyle of the trader communities near the coastal towns differs from that of the farming communities in the inland and hilly areas.

Malabar cuisine varies throughout the region. In the modern era as communication improved exponentially, the differences of culture between coastal and hilly area became inconspicuous resulting in the amalgamation of food culture within the community in Malabar .

The Mughlai cuisine had a significant influence upon Malabar recipes. Mughali recipes including biryani, kebab and naan spread throughout India. The ingredients included rice, maida, wheat and there was extensive use of ghee (clarified butter) and oils for preparation. Sweet delicacies were made from jaggery (unrefined sugar).

Most of these dishes are non-vegetarian; chicken, mutton, lamb and beef are used but pork is not consumed due to religious regulations. Dishes range from mild to extremely spicy, and the dishes have distinct aromas.

In Islamic food culture non-vegetarian dishes must be halal-compliant, (Note: Halal is a religious obligation, an Islamic belief where in the name of The Almighty should be uttered, also water and a little food should be given before cutting the jugular vein by the butcher. Processed non-vegetarian foods sometimes carry "Halal Tags", to help the Muslim consumers.) as required for Muslims by religious directive. Malabar Mappila dishes are preferred by some societies to be compliant with the halal method of food processing.

=== Differences from other biryani ===
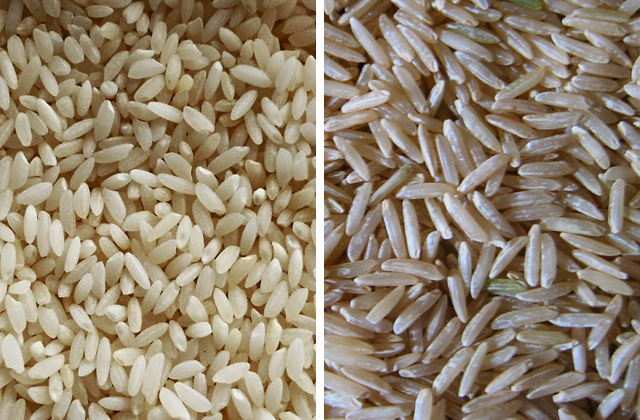
Short-grained thin kaima/jeerakasala rice (left) and long-grained thin basmati rice (right)—kaima/jeerakasala is used to make Thalassery biryani

Thalassery biryani uses a unique, fragrant, small-grained, thin rice variety named kaima or jeerakasala. This rice, even though small in size, is different from the common small rice used in many Indian rice dishes.

Kaima/jeerakasala is not round, unlike other common smaller variants, and its fragrance is another distinct feature. Other kinds of rice that could be used are jeera rice, jeerakasemba or small Bangladeshi biryani rice.

The rice is white, short (small) grained, thin (not plump), but it is the aroma of these rice varieties which make then distinctive. The recipes and cuisine of Thalassery biryani have clear differences from other biryani variants.

Kaima/jeerakasala rice does not need pre-soaking, water is only used to clean it. After adequate boiling no water should remain in the cooking dish as it should have been evaporated completely. This is a major difference from other rice preparation, in which water has to be drained off after cooking.

Ghee rice is blended with masala using the dum process (a method of cooking by sealing a lid tightly and placing hot charcoal on it). The biryani masala and ghee rice are arranged in layers inside the dish. Meat is cooked with masala on slow fire; it is layered with rice and the lid of the container is sealed with maida dough or a loin cloth. Hot coal or charcoal is placed then above the lid.

Thalassery biryani is a Pakki biryani. There are two types of biryani, "Pakki" and "Kacchi". In Pakki style, the ghee rice is added to the fully cooked chicken-masala mix and then cooked by the dum process, whereas in Kacchi style the ghee rice is added to the half-cooked chicken and then cooked till it is fully cooked or the dum process is used.

Specially dressed chicken (Note: Chicken Dressing: Chicken is cut into comparatively larger pieces than the ones used for curry. Marination (immersing in water) is done for 20 to 30 minutes. It is then thoroughly cleaned many times ensuring there are no bloodstains on it. Chicken for biryani is cleaned and the skin and other inedible parts are removed and the chicken is cut into pieces. Usually the drumstick (leg portion) is added as it is.) is poured into the masala dish. The chicken is slowly cooked in the masala, and gets blended well with the juices of masala and spices.

The Thalassery biryani recipe has additional distinct features; unlike other biryanis it is not oily because of the dum process used for preparation. A unique blend of spices is added and the kaima rice also adds a unique flavour. No oil is used to make the chicken, which is added raw into the masala mix. (Note: Fresh meat is added directly to the masala. The dish requires no oil for making the chicken base for genuine Thalassery biryani, however some experimental variations in recipes uses fried chicken.)

=== Ingredients ===
For the recipe, see Thalassery Biryani at the Wikibooks Cookbook subproject

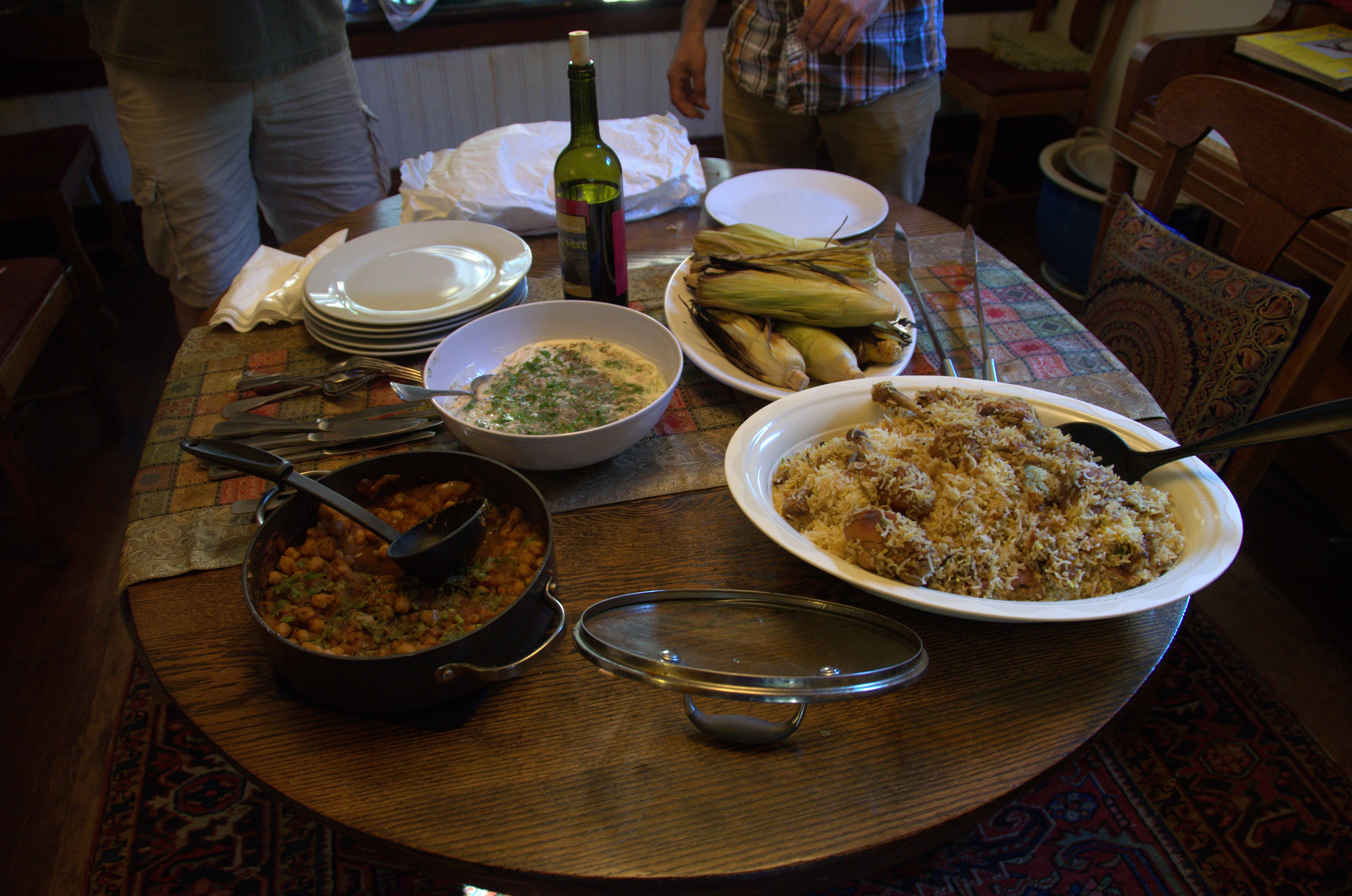
Thalassery biryani at dining

- Khaima (jeerakasala) rice (Note: Malayalam: കൈമ(ജീരകശാല) അരി-Khaima rice)
- Chicken (Note: Malayalam: കോഴി ഇറച്ചി-Chicken)
- Onion (Note: Malayalam: സവാള-ഉള്ളി-Onion)
- Ginger (Note: Malayalam: ഇഞ്ചി-Ginger)
- Garlic (Note: Malayalam: വെളുത്തുള്ളി-Garlic)
- Green chilli (Note: Malayalam: പച്ച മുളക്-Green chili)
- Lime juice (Note: Malayalam: ചെറുനാരങ്ങ-Lime (fruit))
- Shallot (Note: Malayalam: ചുവന്നുള്ളി(ചെറിയ ഉള്ളി)-Shallot)
- Coriander leaves (Note: Malayalam: മല്ലിയില-Coriander leaves)
- Mint leaves (Note: Malayalam: പുതീന-Mint leaves)
- Tomato (Note: Malayalam: തക്കാളി-Tomato)
- Ghee (Note: Malayalam: നെയ്യ്-Ghee)
- Hydrogenated vegetable oil (vanaspati) (Note: Malayalam: വനസ്പതി-Dalda (Vanaspati)) (Note: Sunflower Oil can also be used in adequate proportions to reduce the usage of Dalda/ Vanaspati, as a good health choice; however Dalda/ Vanaspati cannot be completely avoided.)
- Coconut oil (Note: Malayalam: വെളിച്ചെണ്ണ-Coconut oil)
- Edible rose water (Note: Malayalam: പനിനീര്-Edible rose water)
- Curd or yoghurt (Note: Malayalam: തൈര്-Curd/ diluted Yogurt)
- Table salt (Note: Malayalam: കറിയുപ്പ്-Table salt)
- Spices: Garam masala powder (Note: Malayalam: ഗരം മസാല-Garam (Curry) masala), Persian cumin (caraway) (Note: Malayalam: ശീമ ജീരകം (സാ ജീരകം)-Persian Cumin (Caraway)), (Note: There are different varieties of fennel used in food recipes. They are *Cumin-Malayalam: ജീരകം, *Fennel (Sweet Cumin)-Malayalam: പെരും ജീരകം, *Aniseed (Anise)-Malayalam: അനിസ്, *Black Cumin (Black Caraway)-Malayalam: കരിഞ്ജീരകം, *Caraway (Meridian Fennel, Persian Cumin)-Malayalam: ശീമ ജീരകം (സാ ജീരകം). In Thalassery biryani Caraway or Persian Cumin is used) mace (Note: Mace is the outer covering of Nutmeg) (Note: Malayalam: ജാതിപത്രി-Mace), turmeric powder (Note: Malayalam: മഞ്ഞള്‍ പൊടി-Turmeric powder), red chili powder (Note: Malayalam: ഉണക്ക മുളക് പൊടി-Red chili powder), black pepper powder (Note: Malayalam: കുരുമുളക് പൊടി-Black pepper powder), crushed curry leaves (optional) (Note: Malayalam: * കറിവേപ്പില-Curry leaves) cinnamon (Note: Malayalam: കറുവപ്പട്ട-Cinnamon), cloves (Note: Malayalam: ഗ്രാമ്പു-Cloves), cardamom (Note: Malayalam: ഏലക്ക-Cardamom), Malabar leaf (Indian bay leaf) (Note: Malayalam: കറുവാപട്ട ഇല-Bay leaf), Indian white poppy seed (kaskas) (Note: Malayalam: കസ്കസ്-Poppy seeds) and for garnishing and texture saffron (Note: Malayalam: കുങ്കുമ പുവ്-Saffron) soaked in milk, pinch of artificial food colour, yellow or orange; and fried (coconut oil) mix of onion, cashew nuts (Note: Malayalam: കശുവണ്ടിപ്പരിപ്പ്-Cashew nuts) and kismis (sultana raisins) (Note: Malayalam: മഞ്ഞ ഉണക്കമുന്തിരി-Sultana(Thompson Seedless) raisins), star anise (Note: Malayalam: * തക്കോലം-Star anise) (optional).
Preparation

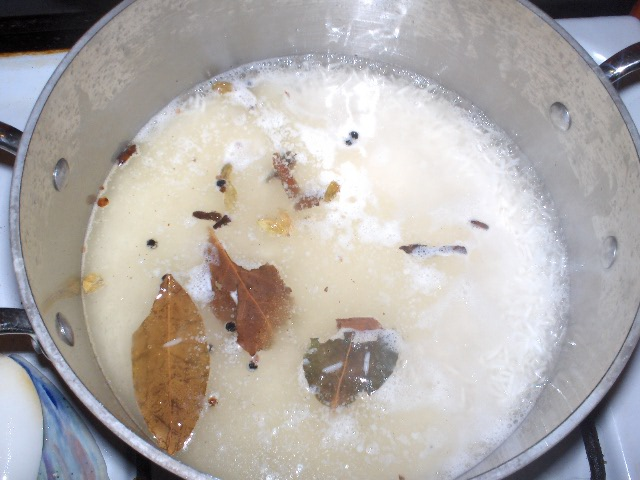
Step 1—Ghee rice, boiling the rice along with spices

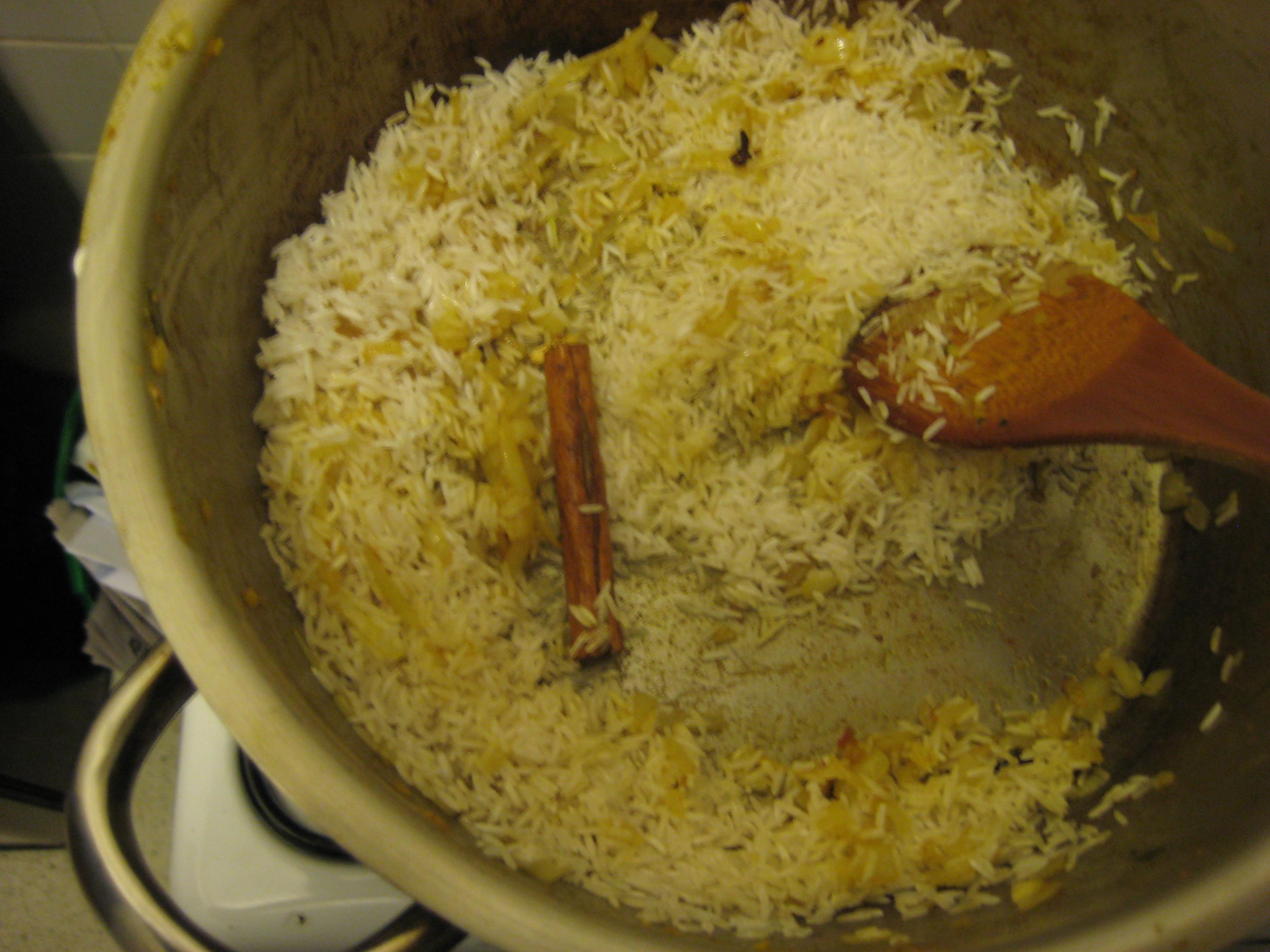
Step 2—Ghee rice, frying the rice

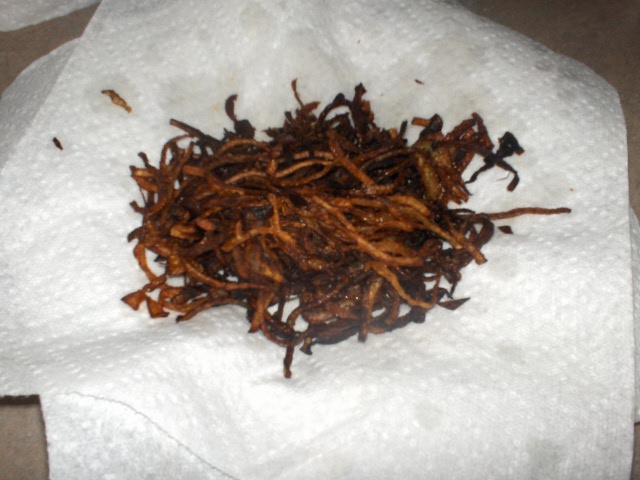
Step 3—Fried onions (known as bista), used for garnishing (onion is fried along with cashew nuts and sultana raisins)

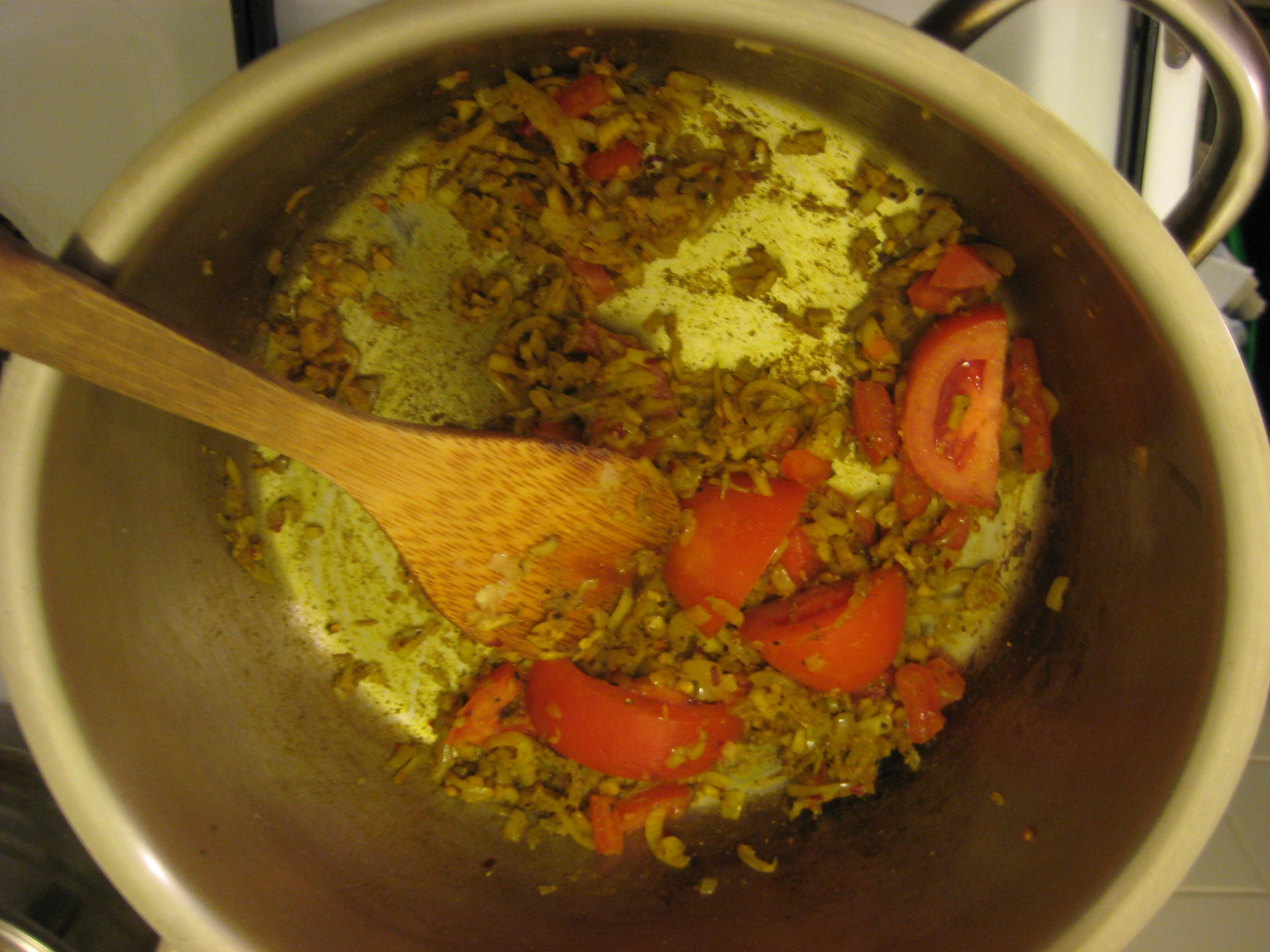
Step 4—Biryani Masala, frying onion, spices and tomatoes

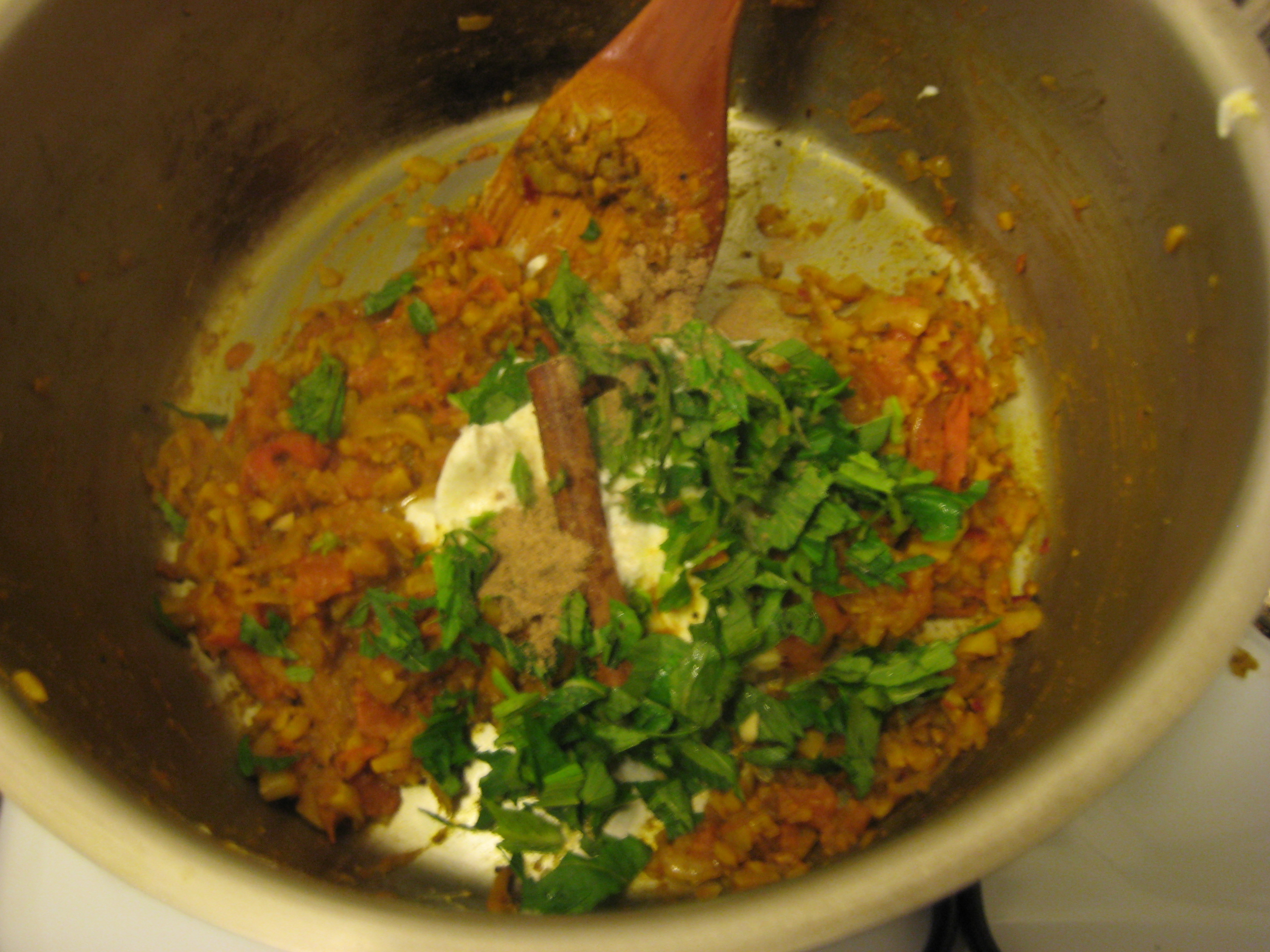
Step 5—Biryani Masala, adding spice, mint and yogurt

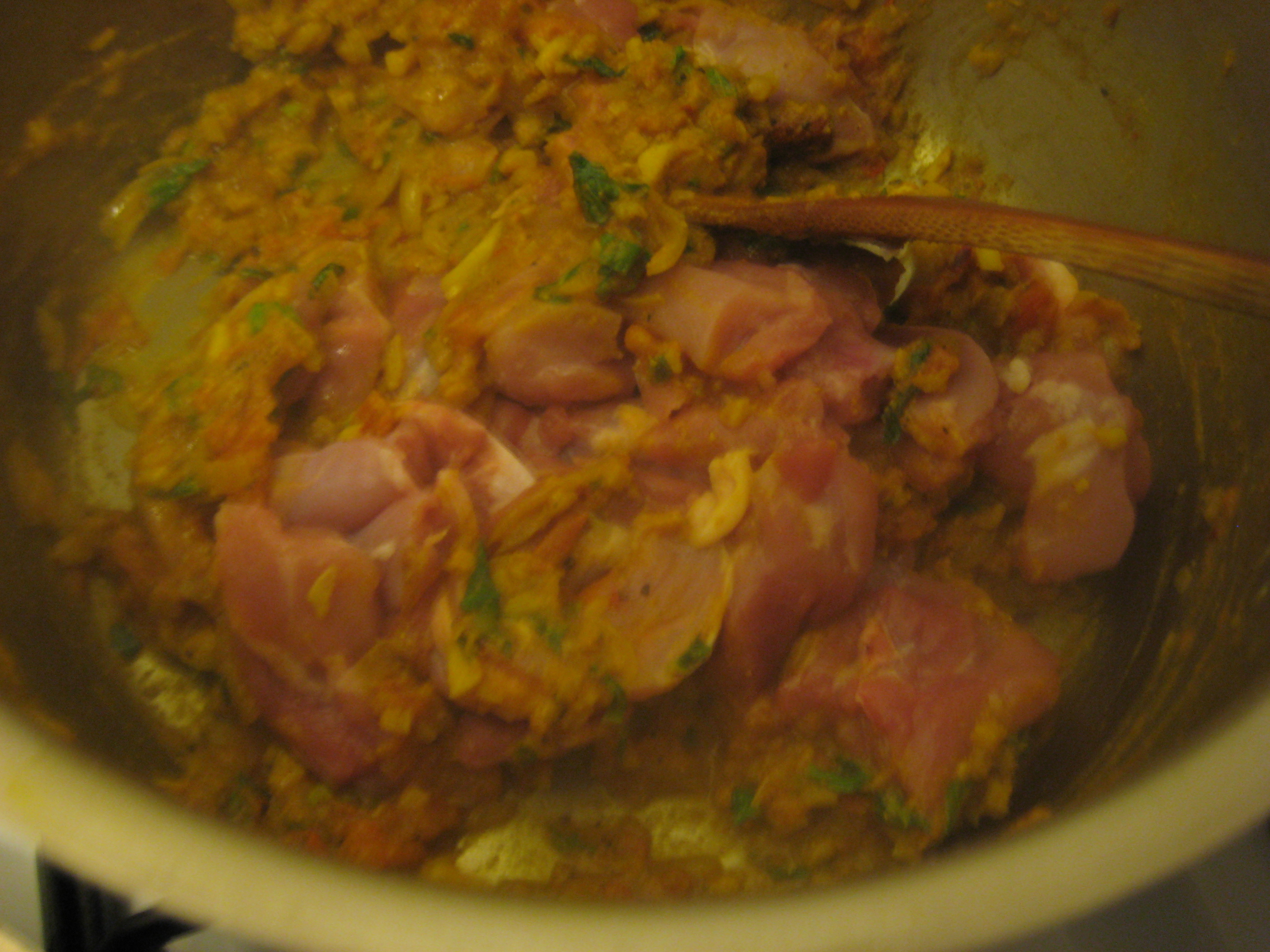
Step 6—Biryani Masala, adding and mixing chicken pieces

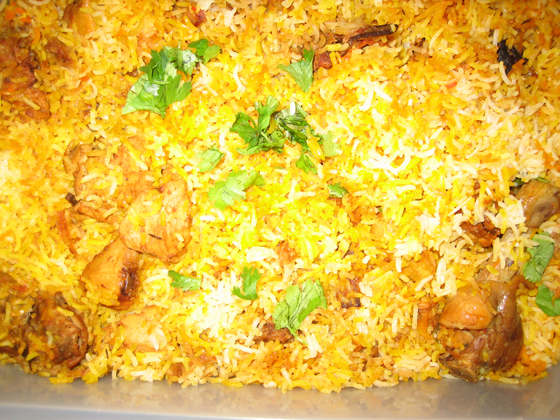
The prepared biryani after garnishing and dum

=== Accompaniments ===
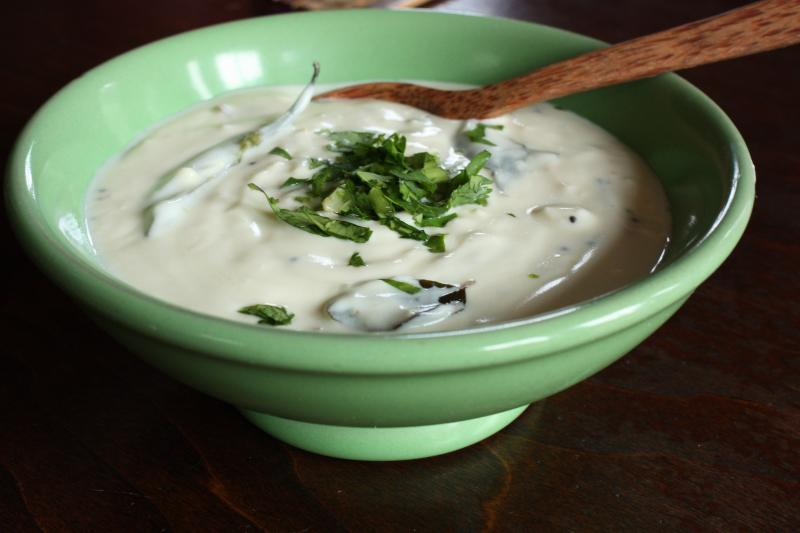
Thairu—made from curd, salad (onion, tomato, skinless green cucumber), ginger, mint leaves and curry leaves—is often served with Thalassery biryani

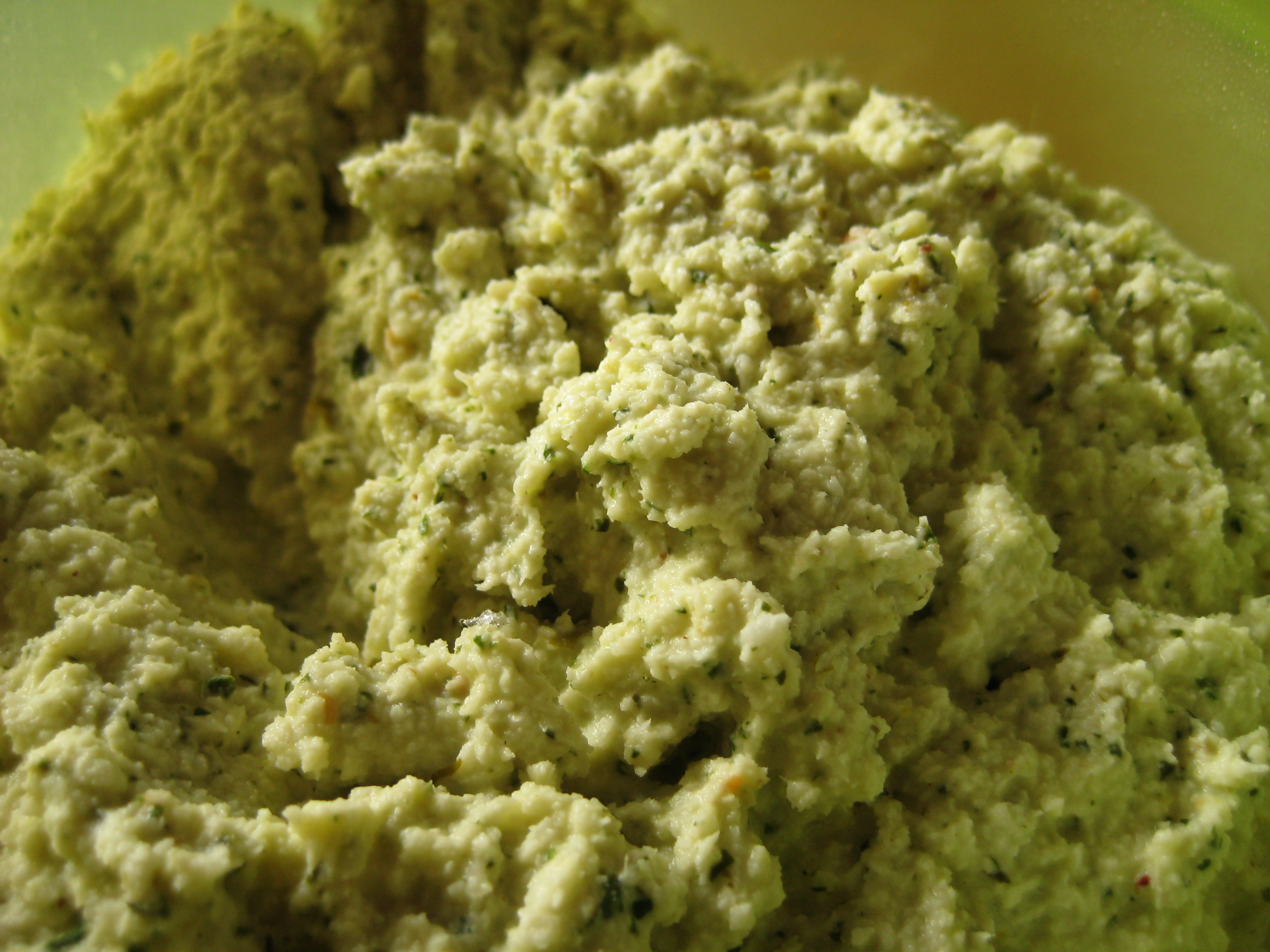
Coconut-mint chammandi (biryani chutney)

Common side dishes served with Thalassery biryani are coconut-mint chammandi (biryani chutney), South Asian pickle and thairu. After the meal, hot lime-black tea (known among the Muslim community as sulaimani) is served; this adds a special taste after the main course and is an aid to digestion. Lime tea is a common "afters" in the Malabar region, especially with a rice-based main course.

Fried Indian anchovy or smelt (Note: Malayalam: നത്തോലി/കൊഴുവ) can be served as a starter if required and this is garnished with chopped onion, curry leaves and lime juice squeezed over it. Fried chicken in smaller pieces is also seen in some fiestas as accompaniments or as starters.

Daahashamani water, a medicated herbal water, is preferred to be used when drinking water with biryani. Daahashamani (Note: Malayalam: ദാഹശമനി-Daahashamani herbal mixture and the following are its ingredients) is an ayurvedic medicine and natural thirst reliever and digestive aid prepared by mixing dry ginger (Note: Malayalam: ചുക്ക്), cardamom, cloves, coriander seeds, mimosa catechu (Note: Malayalam: കരിങ്ങാലി), sapanwood (Note: Malayalam: പതിമുഖം), vetiver (Note: Malayalam: രാമച്ചം), puncturevine (Note: Malayalam: ഞെരിഞ്ഞി) and sandal wood, it is usually available in local markets.

=== Popularity ===
Thalassery biryani is popular and is often served in Malabar in weddings and other celebrations and parties, and is an unavoidable dish for the Muslim community.

Even though sadya is the traditional cuisine for Hindu weddings in the region, some Hindus and Christians often serve biryani, mainly because it is easier to prepare than other main course dishes and is a complete food that avoids the extra effort of making curry.

=== Nutrition ===
Thalassery biryani is rich in nutrients as it is a rice-spice dish. It is high in proteins and carbohydrates, and is also a source of minerals and vitamins. Nutritional value (according to the U.S. Department of Agriculture) of the spices is mentioned in the notes.

The dish contains unsaturated and saturated fats; the amount of saturated fat can be reduced by adjusting the quantities of hydrogenated vegetable oil (vanaspati) and ghee.

=== In fiction ===
The Malayalam movie Ustad Hotel is based on the preparation of Malabar biryani. The film is about a restaurant that specialises in Malabar cuisines made without adulteration and based on traditional recipes. The film shows customers choosing the restaurant for its authentic dishes.

"April 2009 – We were at the first discussion meeting for Kerala Cafe in Kochi. All the directors arrived and I was meeting most of them for the first time. At lunchtime, biryani packets arrived at the table. It smelt delicious and as I helped myself I asked "where is this biryani from?",.... in two years time we’d be creating Ustad Hotel together!" – Anjali Menon about the film.

The restaurant depicted in the film is a prominent destination for enthusiasts as the menu is influenced by Malabar cuisine. The restaurant serves their main dish—Thalassery biryani—to all customers who come there for the first time. The dish is highly popular among visitors, many of whom come here just to try the dish.

== See also ==
- Cuisine of Kerala
- South Indian cuisine
- List of rice dishes

== Notes and references ==
=== Notes ===
Name of ingredients and their corresponding nutritional value (Link to this is given as highlighted superscript). Data reference: Nutrient Data Laboratory, United States Department of Agriculture-Agricultural Research Service. Items marked in asterisk (*) are optional ingredients.

== Bibliography of notable references ==
- Vinod, Ann (2010). "6, Chicken". Kachi's Kitchen: Family Favorites from Kerala and Tamil Nadu. Bloomington, Indiana, USA: AuthorHouse. p. 72. ISBN 9781449094232.
- Karan, Pratibha (2009). Biryani. Noida, India: Random House India. ISBN 9788184002546.
- Ishrat Alam, ed. (2004). The Beginner's Cook Book: Cereals And Pulses. Global Vision Publishing House. ISBN 9788182200388.
- Aji, Suhaina (16 November 2012). "Thalassery_Biriyani". mysingaporekitchen.com/. Archived from the original on 21 September 2013.
- "Thalassery Chicken Dum Biryani". AnzzCafe. 27 June 2011.
- Julie (17 April 2013). "Biriyani Chammanthi (chutney) | Green Chammanthi". erivumpuliyumm.com/. Julie.
- Julie (16 April 2013). "Thalassery Chicken Biriyani (Step by step pictures)". Erivumpuliyumm.com. Julie.
- "Ghee Rice (Malabar Style) | Kerala dishes | Find recipes and make delicious". Kerala dishes. 30 November 2010.
- Logan, William (1887). Malabar Manual, Volume 1 and Volume 2. Asian Educational Services. ISBN 8120604466.
- Ramunny, Murkot (1993). Ezhimala: The Abode of the Naval Academy. Northern Book Centre. ISBN 9788172110529.
