= Poduthol =

South Indian side dish

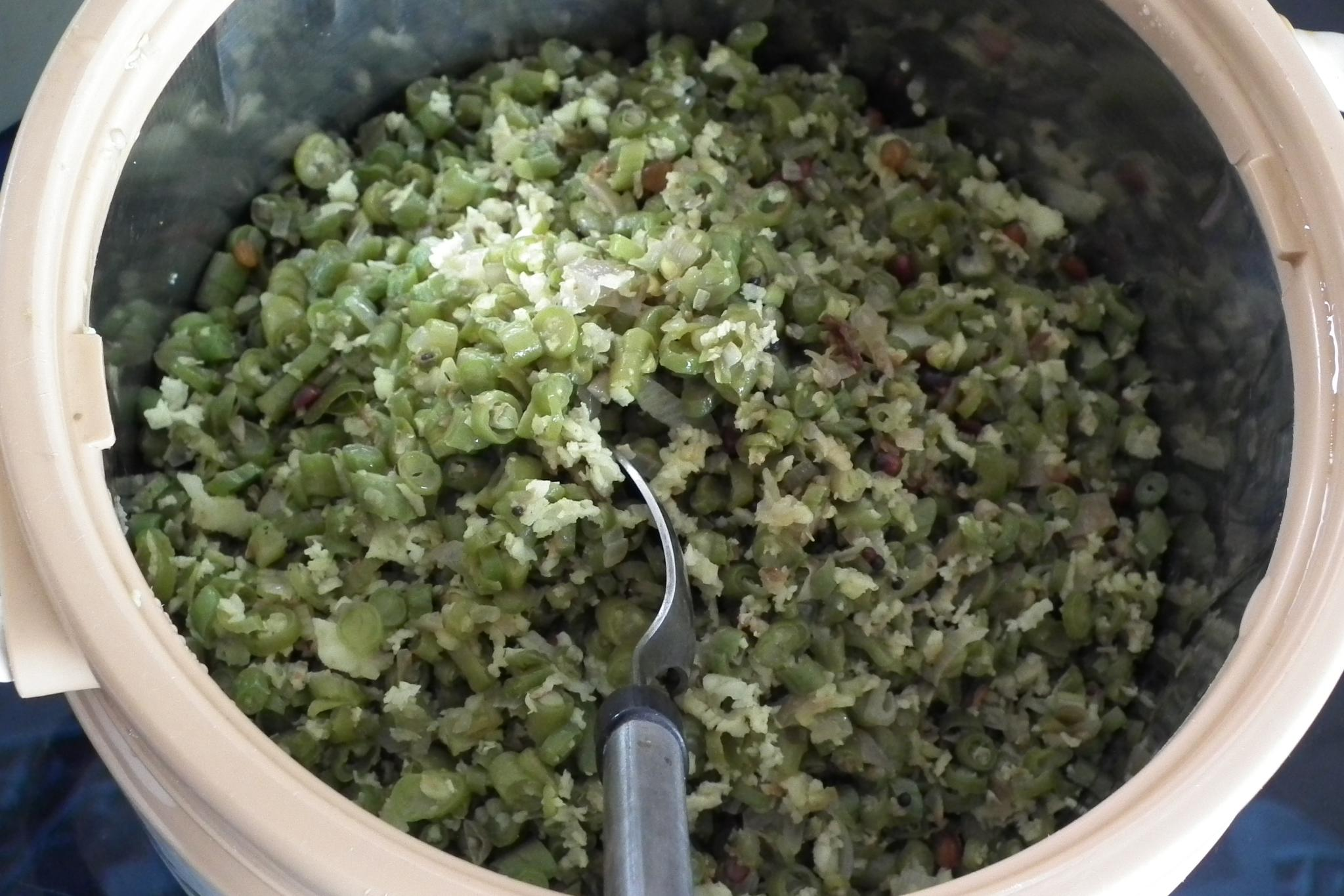
Poduthol

Poduthol (Malayalam: പൊടുത്തോല്‍) is a South Indian North Malabar vegetable side dish. It is generally served with cooked rice at lunch and dinner. It is customarily served in celebration of weddings and other ceremonies.

== Method of cooking ==
The first step in cooking poduthol is finely chopping vegetables, including cabbage, beans, unripe jackfruit, carrot, unripe banana, yardlong bean, bittergourd, whitespot giant arum and leaves such as green or red cheera, Moringa oleifera, Ipomoea aquatica and Sesbania grandiflora. These finely chopped leaves and vegetables are combined with turmeric powder, chili powder, sliced onion and grated coconut. The mixture is put in a hot pan and stirred until fully cooked. After cooking, curry leaves and mustard seeds fried in coconut oil are poured over it along with cloves of garlic.

== See also ==
- Kalathappam
- Kinnathappam
- Kalaripayattu
- Thoran
