= Chatti pathiri =

Layered pastry from India

Chatti Pathiri
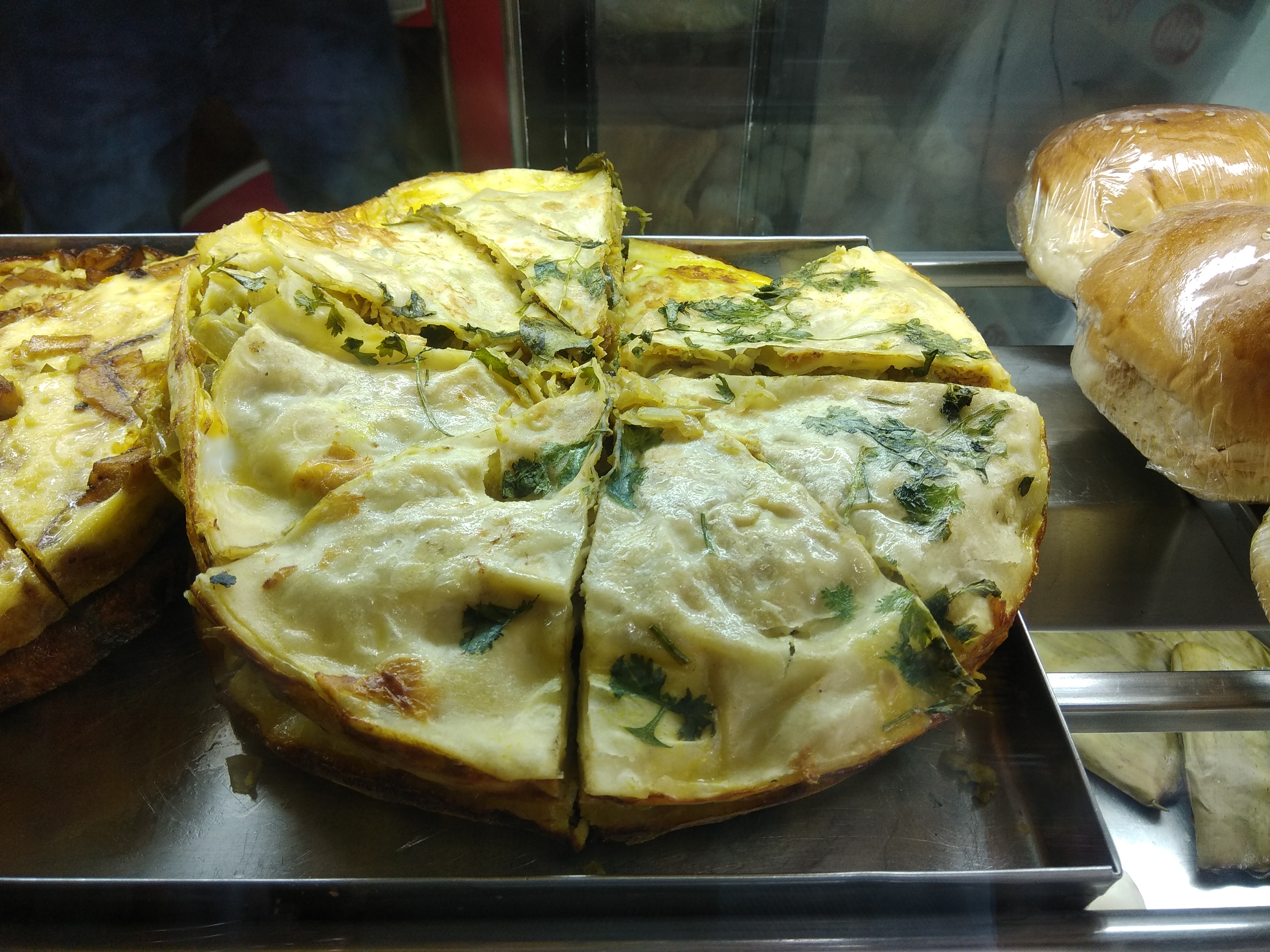
- Chatti Pathiri
- Type: Pastry or Pancake
- Place of origin: India
- Region or state: Malabar
- Main ingredients: Flour, egg, oil and water

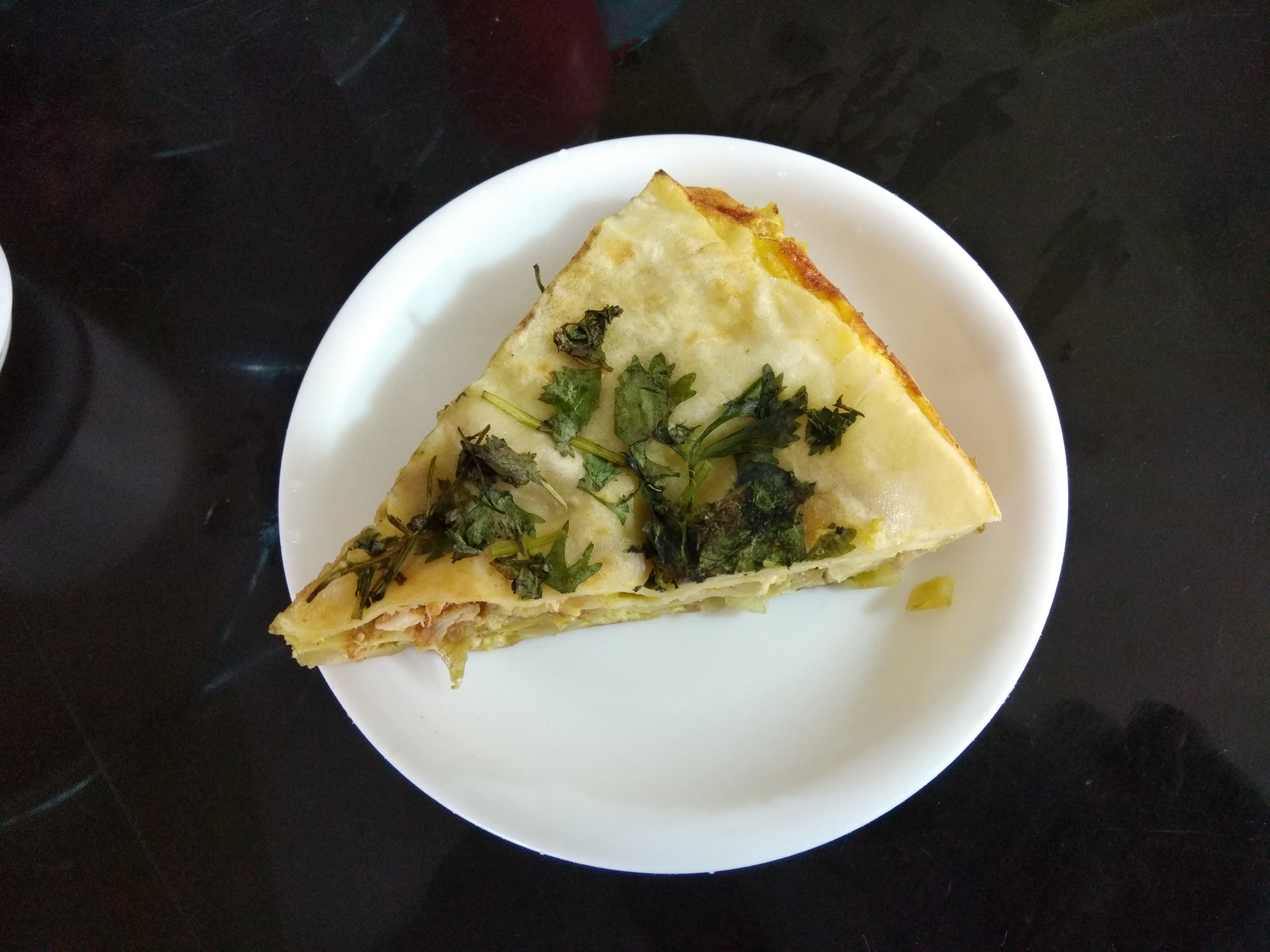
Chatti pathiri

Chatti pathiri is a layered pastry made in the Malabar region, of Kerala, India. It uses pastry sheets or pancakes made with flour, egg, oil and water. The filling can be sweet, made with sweetened seasoned beaten eggs, nuts and raisins, or savoury, with the traditional meat filling used in samosas or savoury puffs. The flour is kneaded into soft dough and rolled into thin pancakes which are softened in milk and arranged in layers with filling between them and baked.

It is considered an essential part of any festival, pre- and post-wedding events, and Iftar. This dish is popular during the Ramadan fasting period.

Chatti pathiri is part of the Mappila cuisine of northern Kerala, which resulted from centuries of trade and cultural exchange between the Malabar coast and West Asia.

== Etymology ==
The word pathiri is traced to fateer, an Arabic name for a plain flatbread eaten at breakfast. Arab traders usually spent months at a stretch on the Malabar coast between voyages, and their food habits carried over into local Muslim kitchens. The Arabic bread was made from wheat, while pathiri is made from rice flour, a substitution usually put down to what was available locally.

== Preparation ==
The sheets are rolled from a soft dough of plain flour, salt and water and cooked briefly on a griddle, which leaves them thin enough that most descriptions of the dish call them crepes. A sweet filling is built from eggs beaten with sugar and ghee and then fried cashew nuts and raisins are folded in, with and cardamom for flavour. Grated coconut is used in some households.

Assembly is done in a pan greased with ghee. Each sheet is dipped in a beaten egg mixture before it is laid down, and that egg sets as the dish cooks and holds the stack together. One version adds mutta mala, threads of egg yolk drizzled into sugar syrup, as a layer of its own. The pan is then covered and kept on a low flame until the base turns light golden, and the whole stack is turned over to colour the other side. Ghee is brushed over it before serving.

== Variants ==
Pathiri is made in many forms in Malabar, and chatti pathiri is one of the stuffed and layered ones, alongside adukku pathiri, petti pathiri, irachi pathiri with meat and meen pathiri with fish. The filling decides whether the dish comes to the table as a dessert or as a savoury snack. Both are common in Northern Kerala.

== Cultural significance ==
The dish is most closely associated with Ramadan, when it is served at iftar in Malabar households. It is also served at Mappila wedding functions. At arayil aakal, the visit the groom pays to the bride's house after the wedding, chatti pathiri is often served with unnakkaya, irachi pathiri and samosas.

== Similar dishes ==
Similar dishes available in Malabar cuisine include:

Name	Main Ingredients	Serving Suggestions
Pathiri	Rice Flour, Salt and Water	Flat Bread or Rice Tortilla
Unnakai	Banana (Plantain), Nuts, Egg, Clarified Butter	Evening Snack

== See also ==
- Pathiri
- Kinnathappam
- Kalathappam
- Unnakai
- List of pastries
- List of stuffed dishes
