= Steamed plate cake =

Traditional sweet cake from Kerala

Kinnathappam
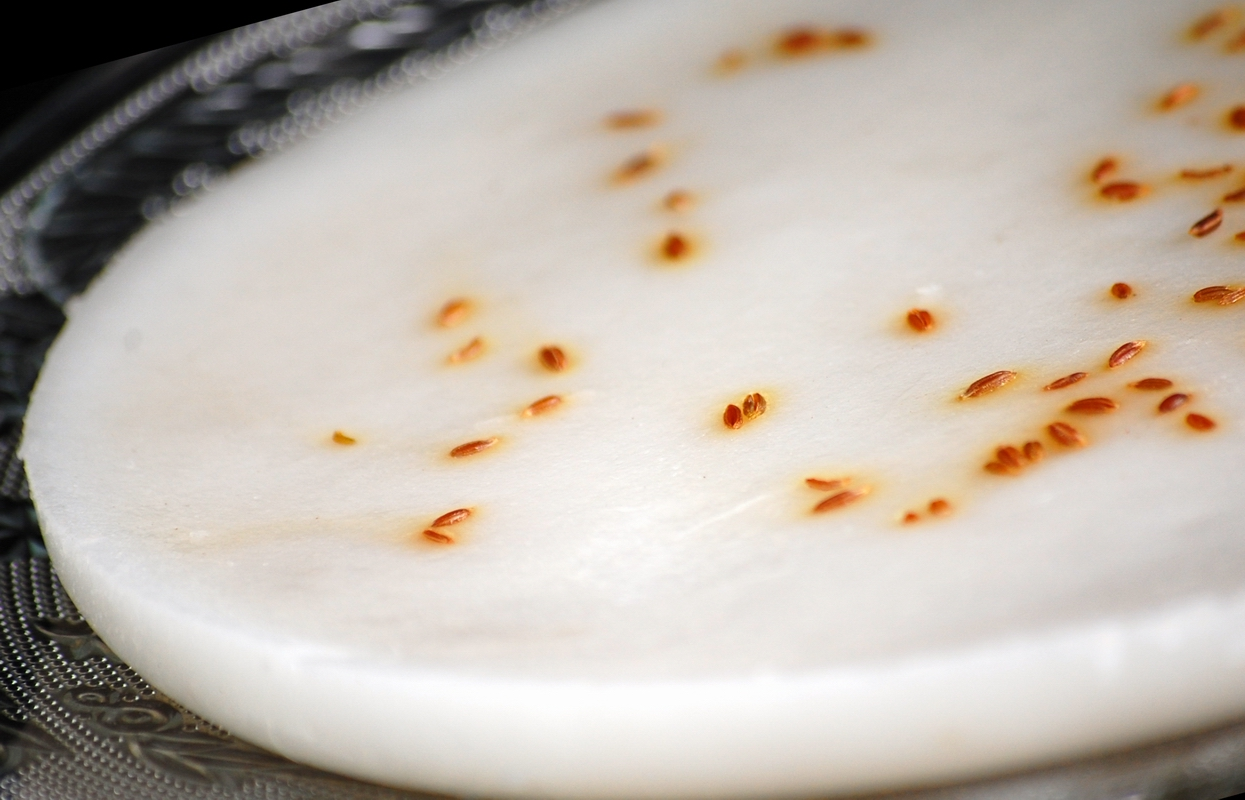
- Kinnathappam (Plate cake)
- Place of origin: India
- Region or state: Kerala
- Main ingredients: Rice flour, Coconut milk, Sugar, Fried Coconut pieces, Cumin

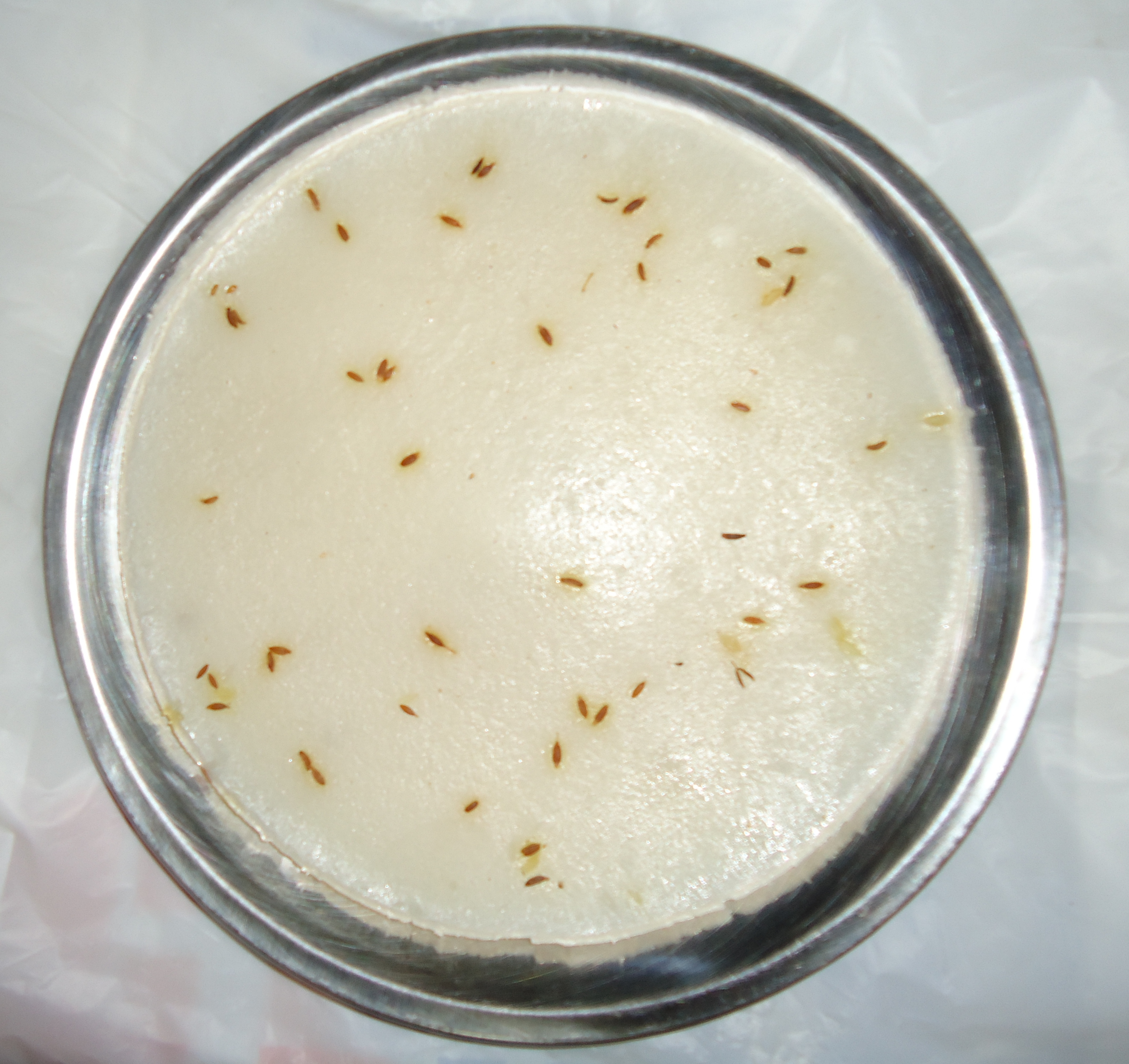
Kinnathappam on Plate

Kinnathappam is a popular traditional sweet cake widely consumed in the state of Kerala in southern India. It includes ingredients such as rice, coconut, sugar and cumin. There are two variants of Kinnathappam. One is white and another is black and long, but the white variant is easier to cook and is very soft compared to the black variant.

== Origin and context ==
Kinnathappam is associated with the Malabar region of northern Kerala, particularly Kannur and Thalassery, and is part of Mappila Muslim cuisine.

== Preparation ==
The cake is made from a batter of raw rice and jaggery, steamed in a plate. Split, fried Bengal gram is added, which sets kinnathappam apart from the related Kalathappam, which uses onion, coconut, and cashew. Once cooked, it often stays fresh for four to five days if stored in a dry place.

In Thalassery, a version of kinnathappam is made as a steamed pudding of egg white and sugar and is served together with muttamala, strings of sweetened egg yolk. This combination is a Mappila sweet offered at weddings and during Eid.

== See also ==
- Kalathappam
- Poduthol
