= Wayanad Gandhakasala rice =

Scented variety of rice from Wayanad

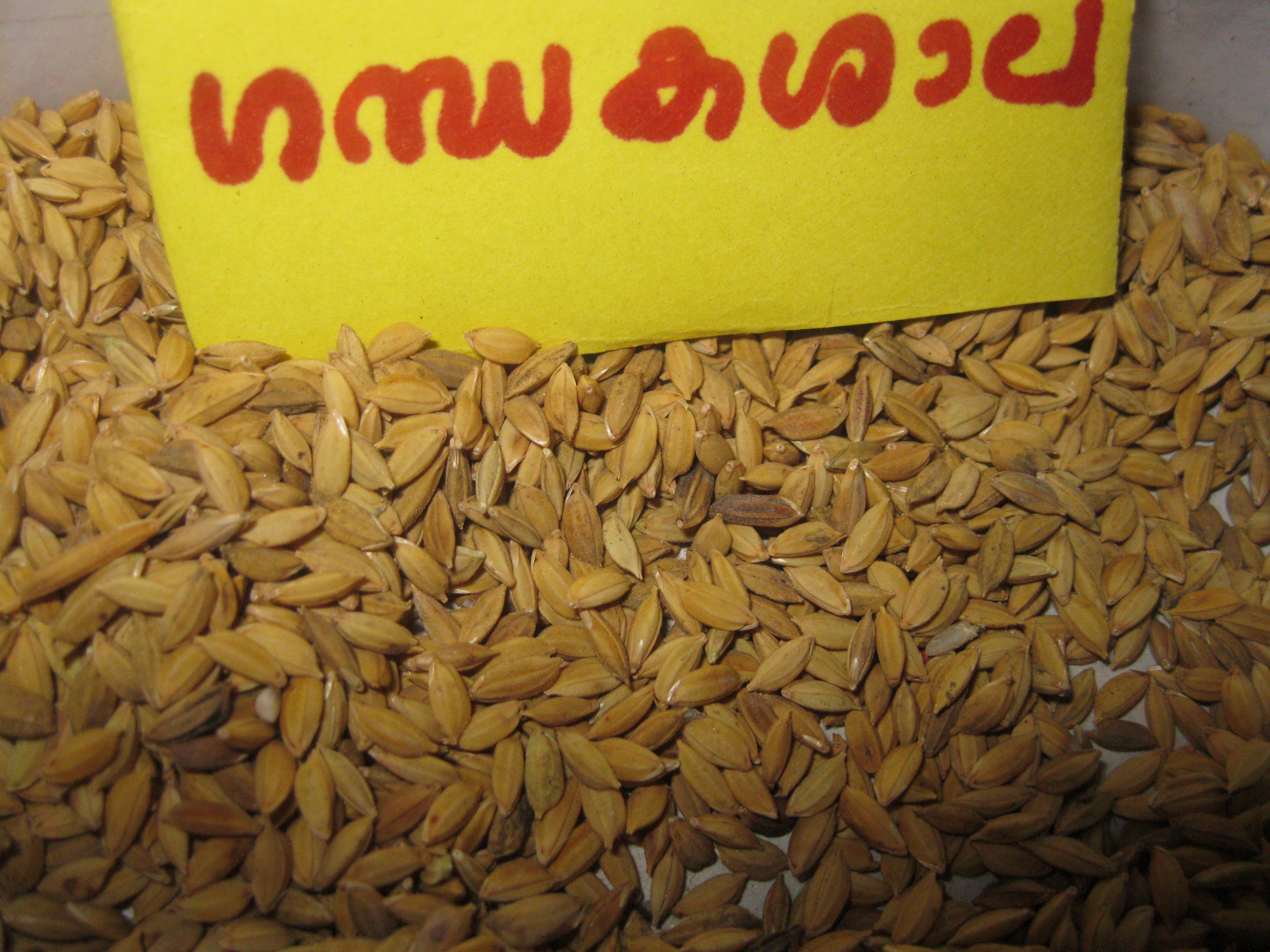
Gandhakasala rice

Gandhakasala rice is a variety of rice cultivated by the farmers in Wayanad District in Kerala. This is a scented variety of rice grown mostly by the members of the tribal communities in Panamaram, Sultan Bathery, and Mananthavady areas in Wayanad. As of 2010, Gandhakasala is cultivated in an area of 327 hectares and jeerakasala in 22 hectares. Wayanad Gandhakasala rice is known for its sandalwood-like flavor, while Wayanad Jeerakasala rice resembles cumin seeds in both appearance and taste and are so unique from one another.

Gandhakasala is one of two varieties of scented rice cultivated in Wayanad the other one being Jeerakasala rice. Both varieties have been identified as having potential to compete with the well known varieties of scented rice like basmati rice and jasmine rice.

Because of the disease-resistant properties, high nutritional value, fine taste and cooking properties, this variety of rice is traditionally used in special occasions like wedding feasts.

== Characterization ==
MS Swaminathan Research Foundation (MSSRF) has characterized this variety of rice in terms of descriptors developed by National Bureau of Plant Genetic Resources (NBPGR) and International Plant Genetic Resources Institute (IPGRI). More than 40 descriptors have been used in this characterization. The Community Agrobiodiversity Center in Kalpetta, Wayanad, established by MSSRF has actively been involved in efforts to conserve these specialty varieties of rice since 1997.

Unlike long-grain aromatic rices like Basmati, Gandhakasala features small, short, bold grains with a golden-yellow colour. Because of its distinct fragrance and flavour it is traditionally used to prepare festive dishes like ghee rice (Neichoru) and special desserts.

== Certification as Farmers' Varieties ==
The paddy seeds of gandhakasala, along with jeerakasala and four more varieties, were given certification as Farmers’ Varieties under the provisions of the Protection of Plant Varieties and Farmers’ Rights Authority, Ministry of Agriculture, Government of India. This was made possible due to the efforts of SEED CARE, an association of traditional paddy cultivators of Wayanad, under the guidance of MSSRF’s Community Agro-biodiversity Centre.

Nationally, this certification has been given to 545 varieties so far, but the Wayanad rice varieties are unique as certification is under the category of that given to a "farming community".

== Geographical Indication registration ==
Gandhakasala rice packaged by KAU

Both jeerakasala and gandhakasala rice have been registered with the Geographical Indications (GI) registry of Government of India in 2010. This was due to the joint efforts of Kerala Agricultural University and Wayanad Zilla Nellulpadaka Karshaka Samithi. It was the agro-ecological conditions, the methods of organic cultivation, traditional genetic makeup of cultivars, and unique processing technologies that has produced the specific aroma and flavour of jeerakasala and gandhakasala rice varieties.
