= Wayanad Jeerakasala rice =

Type of non-basmati aromatic rice

- Geographical indication
- Description: Wayanad Jeerakasala rice is an aromatic rice cultivated in Kerala.
- Type: Aromatic rice
- Area: Wayanad district
- Country: India
- Registered: 4 October 2010
- Official website: ipindia.gov.in

Wayanad Jeerakasala rice is a variety of traditional, non-basmati, medium-grained aromatic rice with golden yellow colour, mainly grown in the Indian state of Kerala. It is a common and widely cultivated crop in Wayanad district. The other variety from the same region, Wayanad Gandhakasala rice, is known for its sandalwood-like flavor, while Wayanad Jeerakasala rice resembles cumin seeds in both appearance and taste.

Under its Geographical Indication tag, it is referred to as "Wayanad Jeerakasala Rice".

== Name ==
Wayanad Jeerakasala rice is a prized crop in Wayanad and so named after the location. "Jeeraka(m)" means cumin and the Jeerakasala is a place or a room where Jeerakam is processed.

== Description ==
List of characteristics and facts about Wayanad Jeerakasala Rice:

=== Characteristics ===
- Wayanad Jeerakasala Rice is famous for its fragrance and aroma of Cumin. Its uniqueness is attributed to the climatic conditions, varietal characters, and organic cultivation methods. Grown in Wayanad's valley bottom, the low temperature regime encourages the cultivation of this scented rice variety.

=== Cultivation ===
- Wayanad Jeerakasala Rice is cultivated in the Nancha season (Kharif) using traditional knowledge and practices. The tribes of Wayanad, including Kurichyas and Kurumas, rely on paddy for their livelihood and food security. The Wayanad Chettis, Kurichya, and Kuruma tribal groups traditionally cultivate this variety, committed to conserving it for future generations.

=== Usage ===
- This rice is used for preparing Ghee rice, also called "Neichore", a delicacy of the Muslims of Kerala, and is a major Mappilah cuisine. Wayanad Jeerakasala rice is also used for preparing Uppuma, Payasam, Puttu, and rice flakes (aval).

== Geographical indication ==
It was awarded the Geographical Indication (GI) status tag from the Geographical Indications Registry, under the Union Government of India, on 4 October 2010 and is valid until 22 September 2029.

Kerala Agricultural University from Thrissur & Wayanad Jilla Sugandha Nellulpadaka Karshaka Samithi from Wayanad, proposed the GI registration of Wayanad Jeerakasala rice. After filing the application in September 2009, the rice was granted the GI tag in 2010 by the Geographical Indication Registry in Chennai, making the name "Wayanad Jeerakasala rice" exclusive to the rice grown in the region. It thus became the third rice variety from Kerala after Pokkali rice and the 20th type of goods from Kerala to earn the GI tag.

The GI tag protects the rice from illegal selling and marketing, and gives it legal protection and a unique identity.
