= Unnakai =

Plantain sweet dish from India

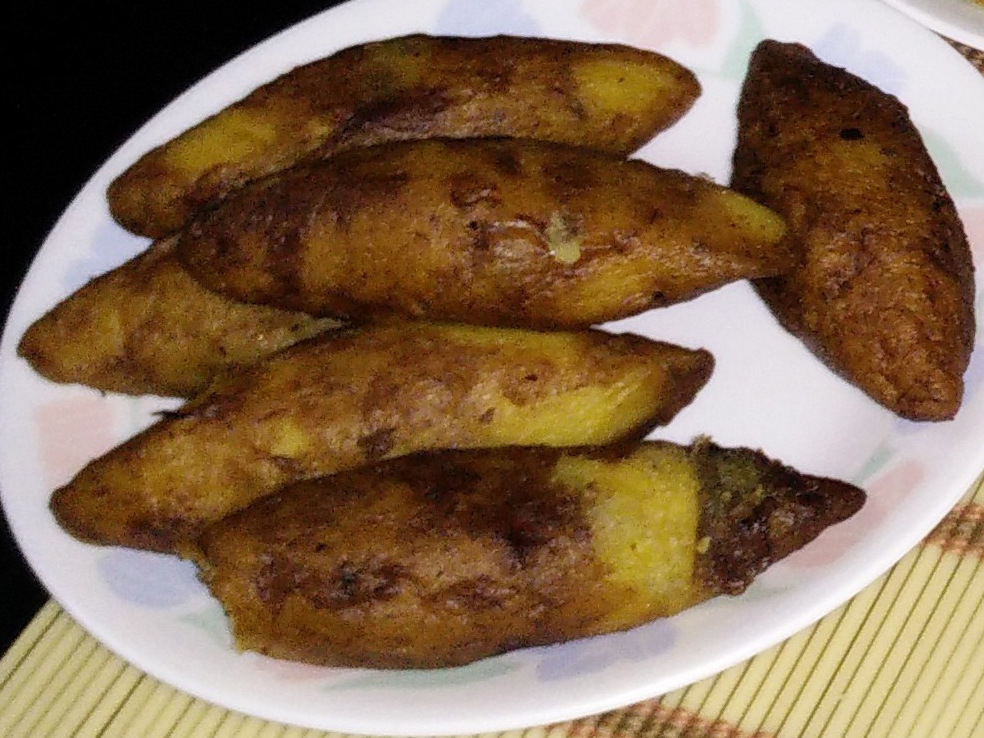
- Course: Dessert
- Place of origin: India
- Region or state: Malabar
- Main ingredients: Nendran banana, coconut, ghee, egg white, cardamom powder, sugar

Unnakai (also called Unnakaya, Kai Ada, Unnakka, and Kai Porichathu) is a spindle shaped sweet dessert made chiefly of banana. It originated from the Malabar region of India, and is often eaten at weddings, Iftar and other festivities.

Unnakai belongs to the Mappila cooking of the Malabar coast. The Nendran is the plantain most grown there, and it holds a settled place in Mappila households.

== Etymology ==
Writing in Whetstone, Jehan Nizar records that the dish takes its name from the pod of the cotton tree, which the fried, bud-shaped parcel resembles.

== Preparation ==
The main ingredient of this dish is steamed and mashed nedran banana, which is a staple in Kerala, India. The relatively dry puree becomes the dough, which is rolled and flattened into patties. These patties are stuffed with sweetened beaten egg, scrapped flesh of coconut, nuts, raisins and cardamom, a spice which is rolled into the shape of a spindle with oiled palm. The stuffed dough is then deep fried in coconut oil, and is either consumed as a snack or topped with sago-based white sauce so that it can be served as a dessert.

== Variations ==
Variations are made by varying the ingredients used in the filling. In certain parts of the region coconut is completely avoided, and the filling is made with just egg, sugar and nuts.

== Serving and occasions ==
Tea shops along Mittayi Theruvu and Mavoor Road in Kozhikode keep unnakai in glass cabinets through the evening, some of them alongside thirty or so other varieties of snack. It is sold there with muttamala, kozhinirachathu and chatti pathiri.

The snack is also among the fried items served at Mappila wedding functions. At arayil aakal, the visit the groom pays to the bride's house after the wedding, it is put out with chatti pathiri, irachi pathiri and samosas.

Malayali migration has carried the dish to the Persian Gulf. Cafeterias and restaurants run by Keralites in Dubai and Sharjah sell it during Ramadan at one to three dirhams a piece, and the chef M. S. Sanoj told Onmanorama in 2023 that unnakaya was among the most popular items on those iftar counters.

== See also ==
- Chatti Pathiri
- List of stuffed dishes
