= Kalathappam =

Indian dessert

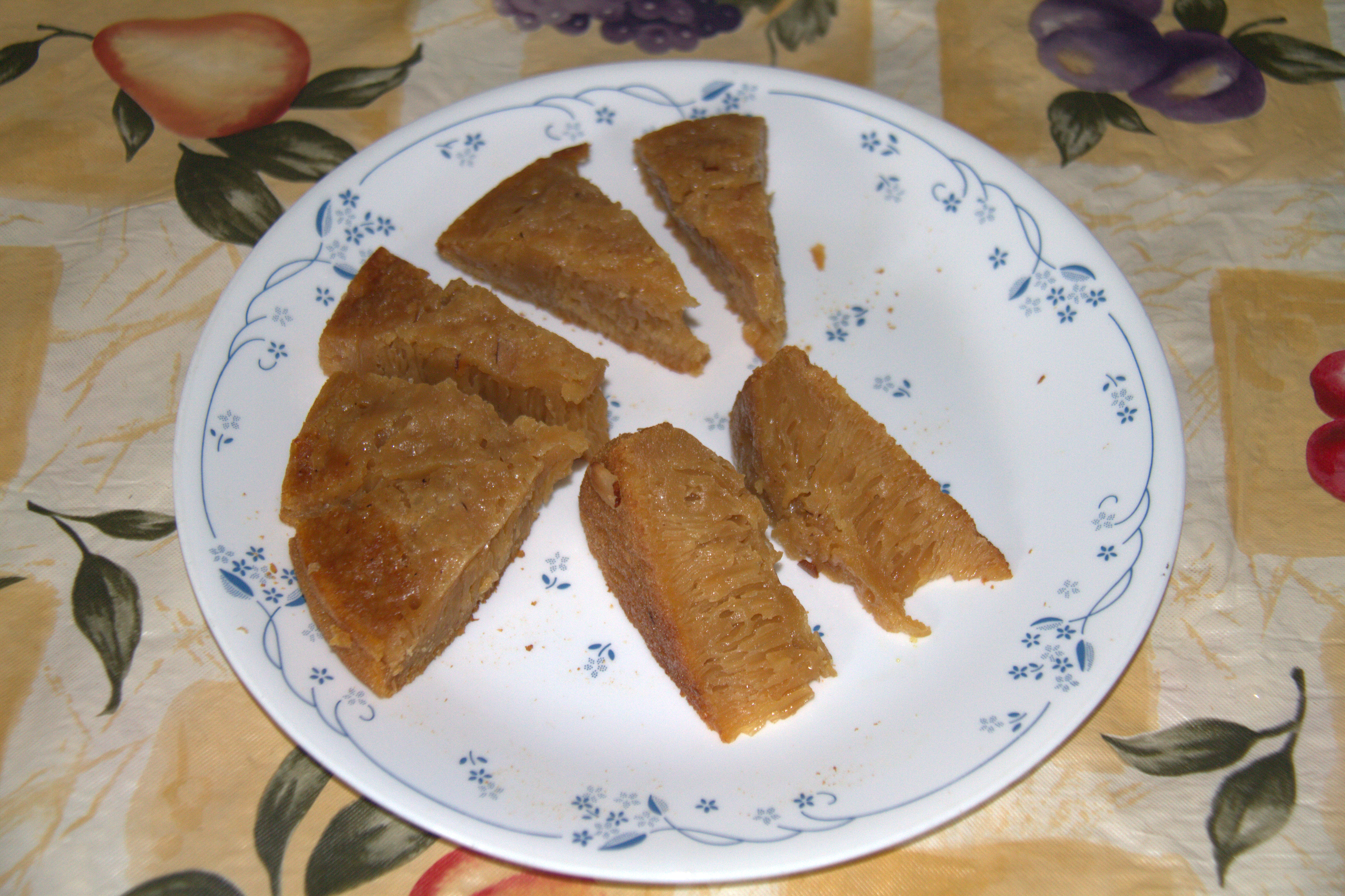
- Kalathappam
- Alternative names: Kalthappam
- Course: Dessert
- Place of origin: India
- Region or state: North Malabar
- Main ingredients: Rice flour, coconut, shallots, jaggery, cashew nut

Kalathappam (കലത്തപ്പം) is a dish from the North Malabar and South Malabar regions of India, especially found in Kannur, Malappuram and Kasaragod. It is known as kalthappa by the Beary Muslims of Mangalore.

It is a rice cake made of ground rice (brown rice), water, coconut oil, jaggery sugar, fried onions or shallots, coconut flakes and cardamom powder. It is cooked in a pan like a pancake, or baked in a traditional oven, or even steamed in a rice cooker.

== Preparation ==
The traditional Kasaragodian way of cooking kalathappam is a bit different from other places. The batter of rice, coconut flakes, onions, cardamom and water is poured into hot oil in a traditional utensil called uruli. Metal is placed over the uruli over which fire is placed in coconut shells. It is heated from above and below. This makes a crunchy shell all over.

== See also ==
- North Malabar
